= Comet Barnard =

Comet Barnard, or Barnard's Comet, may refer to any of the 13 comets discovered by American astronomer, Edward Emerson Barnard, below:

- 177P/Barnard
- C/1881 S1 (Barnard)
- C/1882 R2 (Barnard)
- D/1884 O1 (Barnard)
- C/1885 N1 (Barnard)
- C/1885 X2 (Barnard)
- C/1887 B3 (Barnard)
- C/1887 D1 (Barnard)
- C/1887 J1 (Barnard)
- C/1888 R1 (Barnard)
- C/1888 U1 (Barnard)
- C/1889 G1 (Barnard)
- C/1891 T1 (Barnard)

It may also be a partial reference to several comets he co-discovered with other astronomers:

- 206P/Barnard–Boattini
- C/1886 T1 (Barnard–Hartwig)
- C/1891 F1 (Barnard–Denning)
