= Comet Denning =

Comet Denning, or Denning's Comet, may refer to any of the three comets discovered by British astronomer, William Frederick Denning, below:

- 489P/Denning
- C/1890 O2 (Denning)
- C/1892 F1 (Denning)

It may also be a partial reference to several comets he co-discovered with other astronomers:

- 72P/Denning–Fujikawa
- C/1891 F1 (Barnard–Denning)
