= C/1891 T1 (Barnard) =

Parabolic comet

Discovery
- Discovered by: Edward E. Barnard
- Discovery site: Lick Observatory
- Discovery date: 3 October 1891

Designations
- Alternative designations: 1891 IV, 1891e

Orbital characteristics
- Epoch: 14 November 1891 (JD 2412050.5427)
- Observation arc: 65 days
- Number of observations: 41
- Perihelion: 0.971 AU
- Eccentricity: ~1.000
- Orbital period: ~54,400 years
- Inclination: 77.988°
- Longitude of ascending node: 219.528°
- Argument of periapsis: 269.567°
- Last perihelion: 14 November 1891

Physical characteristics
- Apparent magnitude: 9.4 (1891 apparition)

Barnard's Comet, formally designated as C/1891 T1, is a faint non-periodic comet that was observed through telescopes in late 1891. It is one of 16 comets discovered by Edward Emerson Barnard.

== Orbit ==
William Wallace Campbell published the first orbital calculations for the comet, using positions obtained from the Lick Observatory between 3 and 5 October 1891. These were further refined by Campbell himself a year later, alongside other astronomers, Elizabeth B. Davis, Adolf Berberich and R. Froebe, where they determined a perihelion date of 13 November 1891.

In 1894, while also working out the ephemerides for 489P/Denning (1894 I), John Russell Hind improved C/1891 T1's orbit by using positions obtained from the Cordoba Observatory between 20 October and 4 December 1891, resulting in a revised perihelion date of 14 November 1891. Henry A. Peck provided the comet's definitive orbit in 1903, where he determined two different trajectories, an elliptical orbit with an orbital period of approximately 54,400 years, and a parabolic trajectory. However, the residuals for the elliptical orbit solution were rather large, thus the latter parabolic trajectory is favored for the comet.
