= Barnard 335 =

Nebula

Molecular cloud
- Bok globule
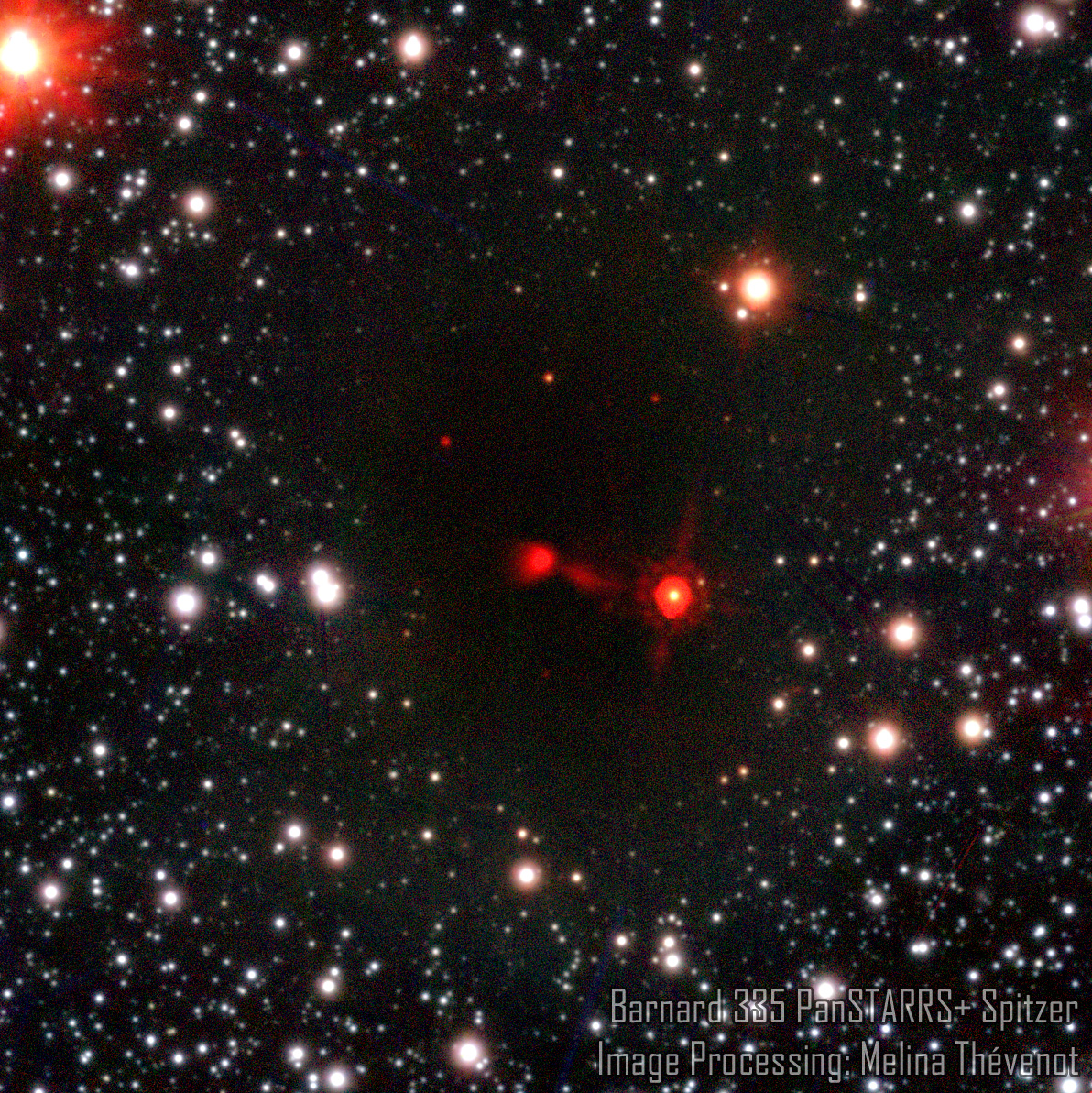
- PanSTARRS + Spitzer (red) image of Barnard 335. The red object in the center is the protostar.

Observation data: J2000 epoch
- Right ascension: 19^{h} 36^{m} 55.0^{s}
- Declination: +07° 34′ 24″
- Distance: 536.5 ly (164.5 pc)
- Apparent diameter: 24.0'
- Constellation: Aquila
- Designations: LDN 663, [CB88] 199

Barnard 335 (also known as B335 or Lynds 663) is a bok globule. It contains a single very young low-mass protostar.

Barnard 335 was discovered in 1927 by Barnard et al. A range of distances were used in the past. In 2009 it was first noted that the south-west of the nebula is bright in the U-band. One possible explanation was that HD 184982 has a similar distance and causes a glow in the form of a reflection nebula. This was however dismissed at the time. The researchers measured a distance of 90 to 120 parsec. Later it was demonstrated that HD 184982 is surrounded by a reflection nebula, apparently related to the bok globule Barnard 335. This star is located 164.5 parsec from the Solar System and Barnard 335 must lie at a similar distance.

The molecular core of Barnard 335 is the densest part of a larger cometary globule. This suggests that external wind shaped the globule and triggered the formation of a single star inside it.

== The protostar ==
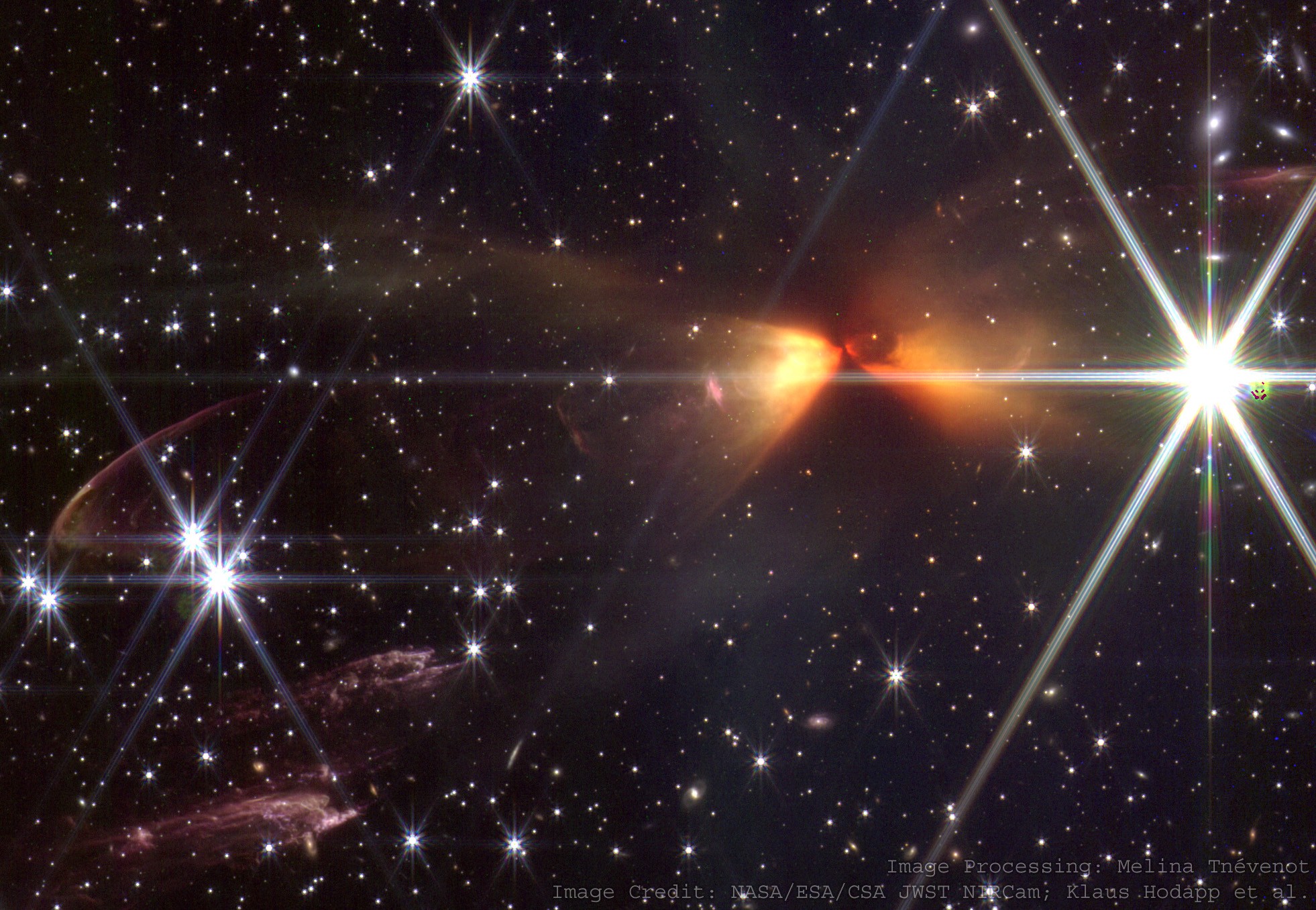
JWST NIRCam image of the protostar in Barnard 335

The protostar was discovered with NASA IRTF and the Kuiper Airborne Observatory. Later it was detected with IRAS and is sometimes named IRAS 19345+0727. It is classified as a class 0 protostar. A bi-polar outflow was discovered in CO emission with the Nobeyama Radio Observatory. Observations with ALMA found infalling material towards the central source, detected via HCN and HCO^{+} emission lines. This was used to determine an age of the protostar, measured between 30,000 and 40,000 years. The protostar consists of a rotating infalling envelope, outflow cavities and a very small disk, as well as a pseudo-disk. The protostar is variable and shows episodic accretion. The disk is in the process of forming, with material infalling from the north and south, with material exceeding free-fall velocities close to the protostar. ALMA observations detected a range of complex organic molecules (COMs), within 10s of AU of the protostar. By analysing the velocity structure of hydrocarbons, a team found that the protostar currently has a mass of 0.03 to 0.07 M_{☉} (31 to 71 M_{J}). Another study found a mass of 0.25 M_{☉}. The magnetic field changes from ordered to pinched to more complicated structures within the inner 100 AU scale of B335.

Herbig-Haro objects around the protostar were first observed in Hα with the NOFS and later called HH119 A-C. Infrared counterparts of the H_{2} shock fronts were labelled HH119 IR1 to IR5. Additional Herbig-Haro objects were later discovered with various telescopes. JWST showed that low proper motion shocks at the periphery of the outflow show bow shocks pointing towards the protostar. High proper motion shocks at the central axis of the outflow showed bow shocks pointing away from the protostar.

JWST NIRCam images showing the movement of the inner shocks between 2023 and 2024. Shock 3E is the moving dot located near the center

Around 2015 a molecular bullet was likely ejected from the protostar, associated with a recent accretion event. Observations with WISE showed an outburst between 2015 and 2022. Both events are linked with each other. JWST NIRCam imaging does show that the dim shock 2E was ejected in March 2015, but the brighter shock 3E (launched in 2010) would match the light curve better. The innermost shocks show emission from carbon monoxide and molecular hydrogen. Older shocks only show H_{2} emission. The youngest shock was ejected in August 2022.

== See also ==
- List of dark nebulae
- Barnard Catalogue
- Lynds' Catalogue of Dark Nebulae
