= NGC 1721 =

Lenticular galaxy in the constellation Eridanus

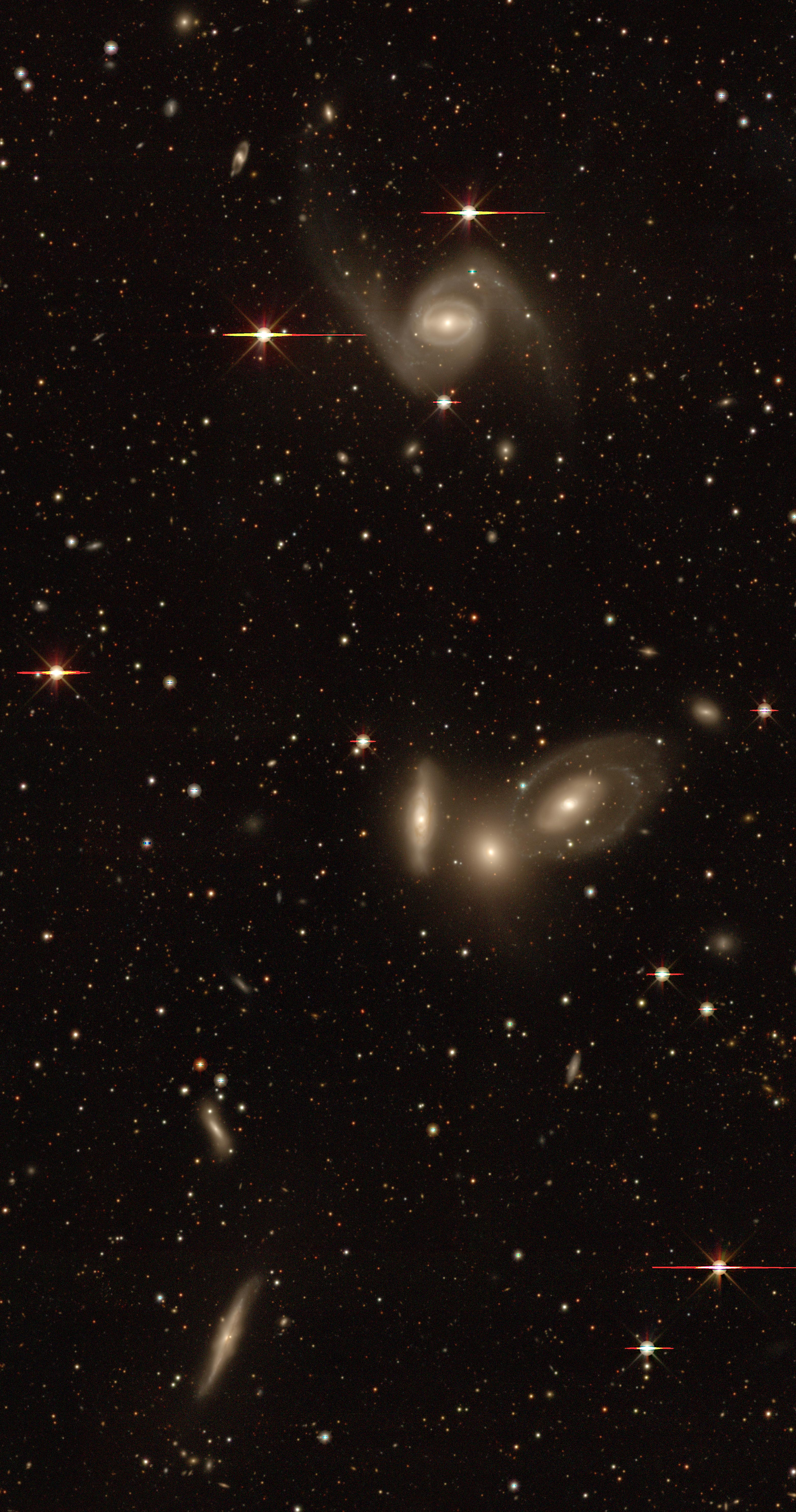
- Galaxy group in Eridanus showing NGC 1721, NGC 1723, NGC 1725, and NGC 1728. NGC 1721 is the right galaxy in the compact group in the middle.

Observation data (J2000 epoch)
- Constellation: Eridanus
- Right ascension: 04^{h} 59^{m} 17.4^{s}
- Declination: −11° 07′ 07″
- Redshift: 0.015010
- Heliocentric radial velocity: 4 500 ± 9 km/s
- Galactocentric velocity: 4 388 ± 10 km/s
- Distance: 200 Mly (61.3 Mpc)

Characteristics
- Type: (R')SAB0^{0}(s)
- Size: 36.92 by 17.58 kpc

Other designations
- MCG -02-13-027, PGC 16484

NGC 1721 is a lenticular galaxy (S0) located in the constellation Eridanus. It was discovered on the 10th of Nov 1885 by Edward Emerson Barnard. This galaxy is a member of the NGC 1723 Group—consisting of NGC 1723 (the brightest member, 11.7-mag) and a close triplet of NGC 1721, NGC 1725 and NGC 1728.

NGC 1721 is a Dreyer Object (a now archaic astronomical term), meaning that it was included in the original New General Catalogue by JLE Dreyer.
