= E Nebula =

Pair of dark nebulae

"E" or "Barnard's E" Nebula
Dark nebula
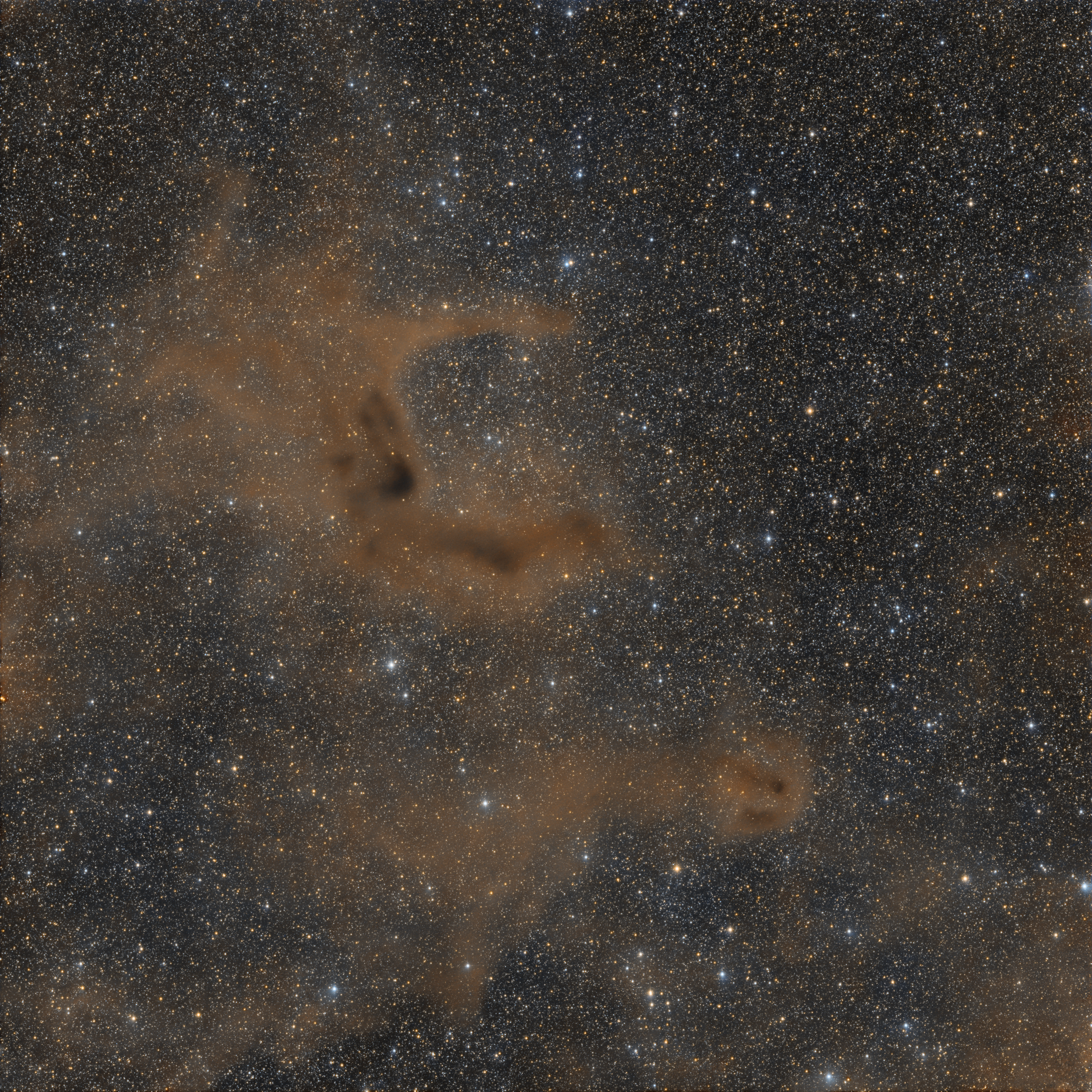
- Barnard's "E" Nebula (B142, 143)

Observation data: J2000.0 epoch
- Right ascension: 19^{h} 40^{m} 42^{s}
- Declination: +10° 57′
- Distance: 2000 ly (613 pc)
- Apparent magnitude (V): –
- Apparent dimensions (V): 30 arcmins
- Constellation: Aquila

Physical characteristics
- Absolute magnitude (V): –
- Notable features: –
- Designations: Barnard 142, 143

The "E" or "Barnard's E" Nebula (officially designated as Barnard 142 and 143) is a pair of dark nebulae in the constellation Aquila. It is a well-defined dark area on a background of Milky Way consisting of countless stars of all magnitudes, getting its name from its resemblance to the letter E in the Latin alphabet. Its size is about that of the full moon, or roughly 0.5 degrees, and its distance from earth is estimated at 2,000 light years.
