= NGC 1725 =

Elliptical galaxy in the constellation Eridanus

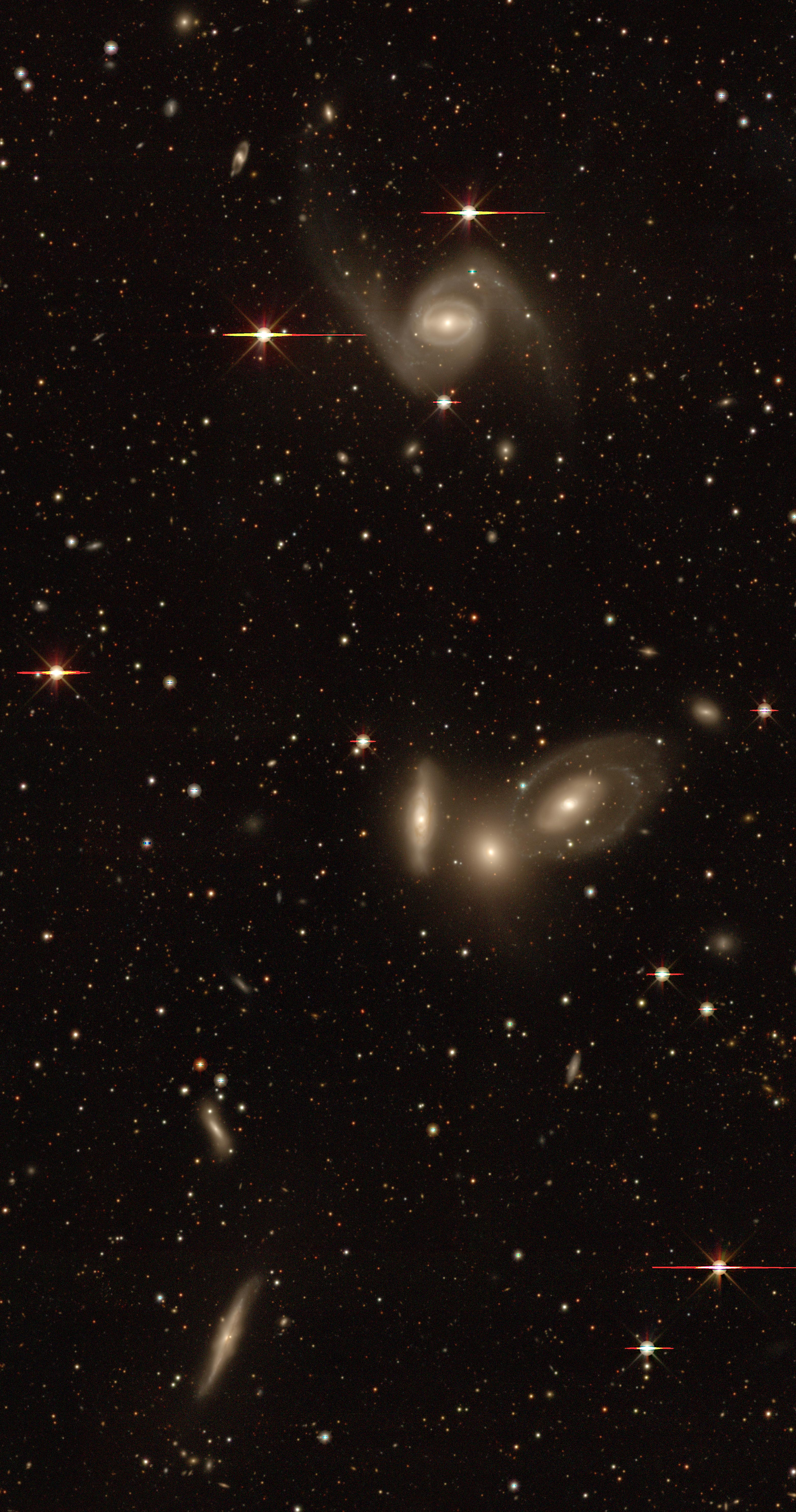
- Galaxy group in Eridanus showing NGC 1721, NGC 1723, NGC 1725, and NGC 1728. NGC 1725 is the middle galaxy in the compact group in the middle

Observation data (J2000 epoch)
- Constellation: Eridanus
- Right ascension: 04^{h} 59^{m} 22.9^{s}
- Declination: −11° 07′ 56″
- Redshift: 0.012956
- Heliocentric radial velocity: 3 884 ± 42 km/s
- Galactocentric velocity: 3 772 ± 42 km/s
- Distance: 172.8 Mly (53.0 Mpc) h^{−1}_{0.73}
- Apparent magnitude (B): 13

Characteristics
- Type: S0
- Size: 18.7 × 14.4 h^{−1}_{0.73} kpc

Other designations
- MCG -02-13-028, PGC 16488

NGC 1725 is a lenticular galaxy in the constellation Eridanus. The galaxy is listed in the New General Catalogue. It was discovered on November 10, 1885 by the astronomer Edward Emerson Barnard.

In 2009, a type Ia supernova was detected within NGC 1725. It was subsequently designated SN 2009F.
