= NGC 447 =

Spiral galaxy in the constellation Pisces

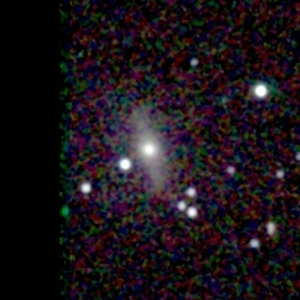
- NGC 447 as seen by 2MASS

Observation data (J2000 epoch)
- Constellation: Pisces
- Right ascension: 01^{h} 15^{m} 37.6^{s}
- Declination: +33° 04′ 04″
- Redshift: 0.018670
- Heliocentric radial velocity: 5,597 km/s
- Distance: 232 Mly
- Apparent magnitude (V): 15.1
- Absolute magnitude (V): -22.94

Characteristics
- Type: (R)SB(rs)0/a
- Apparent size (V): 2.2' × 2.2'

Other designations
- UGC 00804, CGCG 502-013, MCG +05-04-006, 2MASX J01153760+3304035, 2MASXi J0115374+330401, IRAS F01128+3248, PGC 4550, IC 1656.

NGC 447 is a spiral galaxy of type (R)SB(rs)0/a located in the constellation Pisces. It was first discovered on October 8, 1861 by Heinrich d'Arrest (and later listed as NGC 447); it was also seen in the 1890s by Edward Emerson Barnard (and later listed as IC 1656). It was described by Dreyer as "faint, pretty large, brighter middle, 11th magnitude star to northeast."

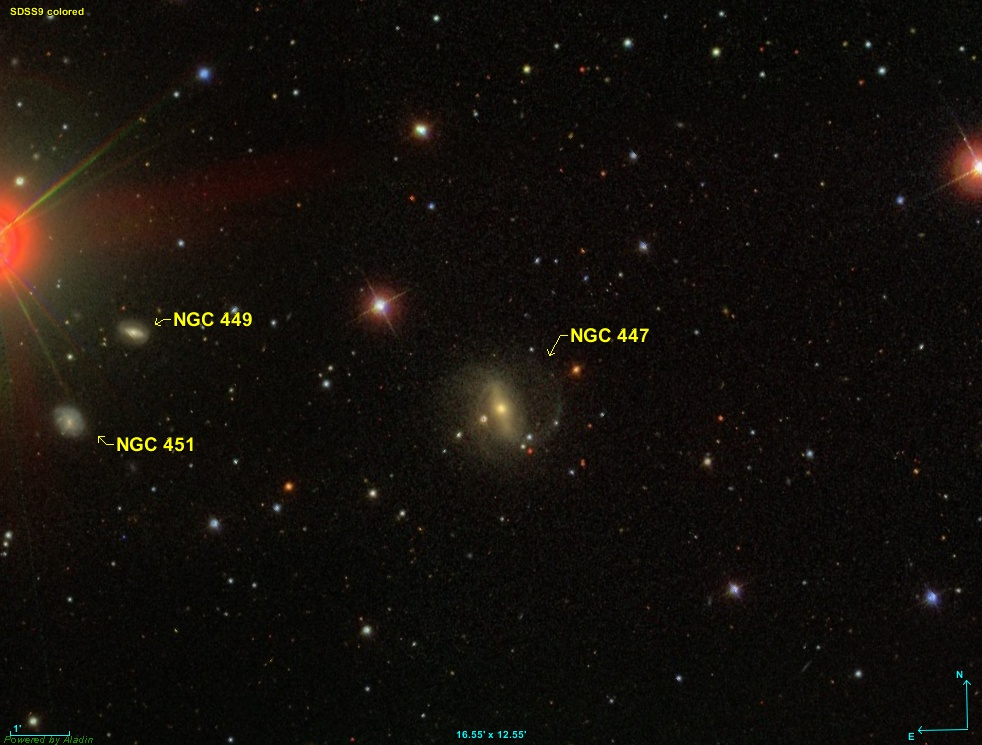
NGC 447 (SDSS)
