= NGC 1728 =

Spiral galaxy in the constellation Eridanus

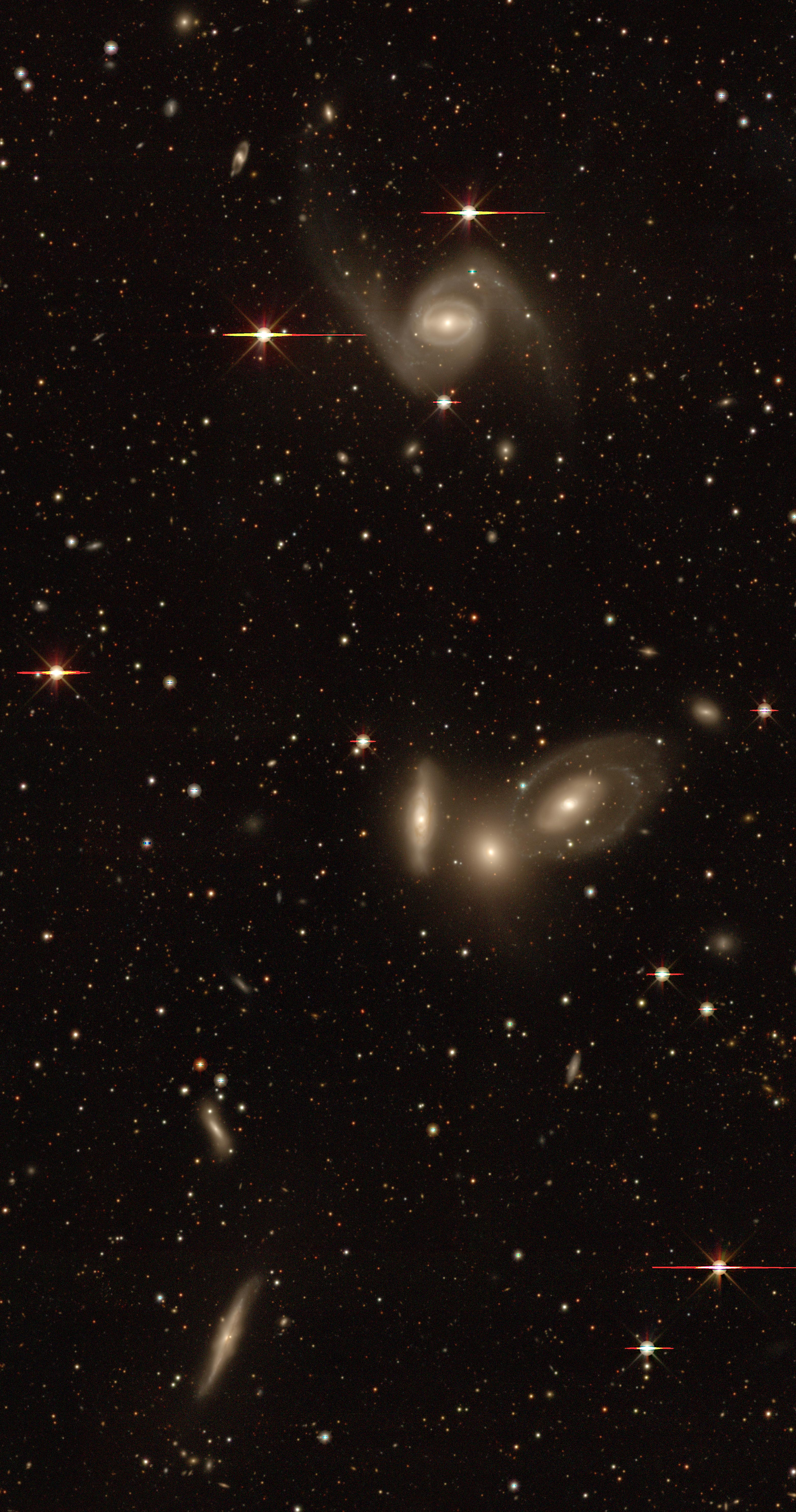
- legacy survey image of NGC 1721, NGC 1723, NGC 1725, and NGC 1728. The galaxy NGC 1728 is the left galaxy in the compact group in the middle.

Observation data (J2000 epoch)
- Constellation: Eridanus
- Right ascension: 04^{h} 59^{m} 27.719^{s}
- Declination: −11° 07′ 22.48″
- Redshift: 0.012632
- Heliocentric radial velocity: 3763 ± 11 km/s
- Distance: 167.6 Mly (51.38 Mpc)
- Apparent magnitude (B): 13

Characteristics
- Type: Sa pec

Other designations
- MCG -02-13-030, PGC 16495

NGC 1728 is a spiral galaxy in the constellation Eridanus. The galaxy is listed in the New General Catalogue. It was discovered on November 10, 1885 by the astronomer Edward Emerson Barnard.
