= 178P/Hug–Bell =

Periodic comet

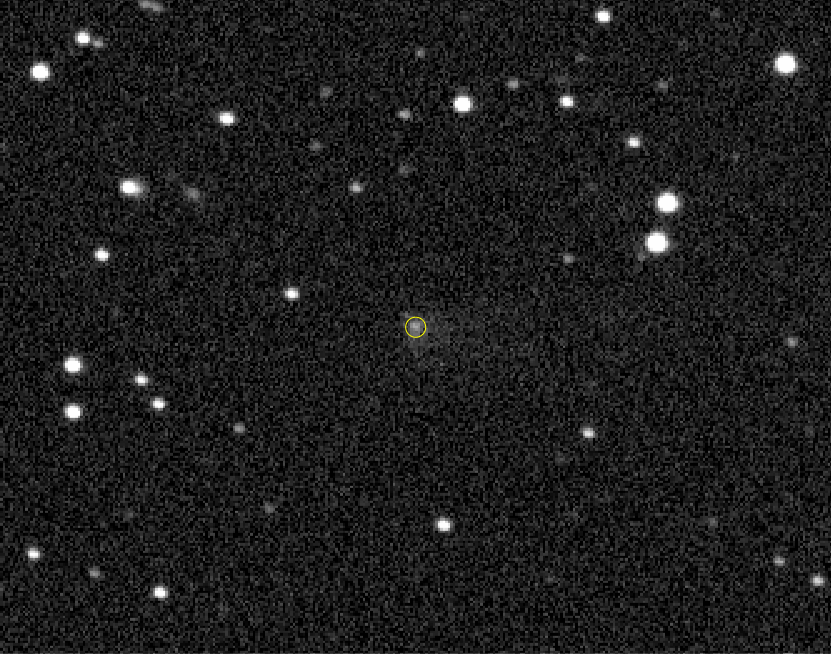
- Comet Hug–Bell photographed from the Zwicky Transient Facility on 7 January 2021

Discovery
- Discovered by: Gary Hug; Graham E. Bell
- Discovery site: Eskridge, Kansas
- Discovery date: 10 December 1999

Designations
- MPC designation: P/1999 X1, P/2006 O1

Orbital characteristics
- Epoch: 4 June 2027 (JD 2461560.5)
- Observation arc: 21.43 years
- Earliest precovery date: 10 October 1999
- Number of observations: 1,074
- Aphelion: 5.385 AU
- Perihelion: 1.880 AU
- Semi-major axis: 3.633 AU
- Eccentricity: 0.48245
- Orbital period: 6.924 years
- Inclination: 11.091°
- Longitude of ascending node: 102.79°
- Argument of periapsis: 297.95°
- Mean anomaly: 220.91°
- Last perihelion: 16 July 2020
- Next perihelion: 21 June 2027
- T_{Jupiter}: 2.871
- Earth MOID: 0.971 AU
- Jupiter MOID: 0.655 AU

Physical characteristics
- Mean radius: 1.77 km (1.10 mi)
- Comet total magnitude (M1): 13.2
- Comet nuclear magnitude (M2): 15.9

178P/Hug–Bell is a Jupiter-family comet with a 6.9-year orbit around the Sun. It was discovered by Northeast Kansas Amateur Astronomers' League members Gary Hug and Graham Bell and is thought to be the first periodic comet to be discovered by amateurs. It was declared a comet less than two days after its initial discovery, after having its course confirmed on previous images.

== Orbit ==
Hug–Bell's orbital period is about seven years; its orbit is eccentric, though less so than many comets. Hug–Bell's orbit lies entirely outside the orbit of Mars, but at its aphelion overlaps in solar distance with the orbit of Jupiter. Because it never comes closer to the Sun than about 2 AU (300 million km), it is never expected to be a very bright comet, with a typical perihelion magnitude of 18–19.

Numbered comets
Previous; 177P/Barnard	178P/Hug–Bell	Next; 179P/Jedicke
