= Gary Hug =

American astronomer

Minor planets discovered: 304
see § List of discovered minor planets

Gary Hug is an American amateur astronomer and a prolific discoverer of minor planets, who, along with Graham E. Bell, operates the Farpoint Observatory and Sandlot Observatory (H36) in Kansas, United States.

He is the co-discoverer of comet 178P/Hug-Bell and was awarded twice a Gene Shoemaker NEO Grant for improved near-Earth object searches in 2009 and 2018, respectively. Hug also represents the Northeast Kansas Amateur Astronomer's League.

== List of discovered minor planets ==
15992 Cynthia	18 December 1998	list
18055 Fernhildebrandt	11 October 1999	list^{[A]}
(22821) 1999 RS_{33}	2 September 1999	list^{[A]}
23989 Farpoint	3 September 1999	list^{[A]}
24265 Banthonytwarog	13 December 1999	list^{[A]}
24305 Darrellparnell	26 December 1999	list^{[A]}
24308 Cowenco	29 December 1999	list^{[A]}
25594 Kessler	29 December 1999	list^{[A]}
(25595) 1999 YD_{9}	29 December 1999	list^{[A]}
(26436) 1999 YV_{4}	28 December 1999	list^{[A]}
31664 Randiiwessen	8 May 1999	list
(32165) 2000 NY_{5}	9 July 2000	list
(32196) 2000 OK	19 July 2000	list
33747 Clingan	14 August 1999	list
(34872) 2001 UV_{2}	20 October 2001	list
(37162) 2000 WV_{9}	22 November 2000	list
(38604) 1999 YJ_{4}	27 December 1999	list^{[A]}
(40331) 1999 MS_{1}	17 June 1999	list^{[A]}
(40437) 1999 RU_{33}	6 September 1999	list^{[A]}
(40438) 1999 RV_{33}	6 September 1999	list^{[A]}
(41057) 1999 VU_{22}	12 November 1999	list^{[A]}
(42925) 1999 TC_{6}	6 October 1999	list^{[A]}
(43031) 1999 VY_{25}	14 November 1999	list^{[A]}
(45178) 1999 XW_{143}	13 December 1999	list^{[A]}
(45253) 1999 YU_{4}	28 December 1999	list^{[A]}

(45255) 1999 YK_{13}	31 December 1999	list^{[A]}
(48222) 2001 KJ_{42}	19 May 2001	list
(49300) 1998 VZ_{5}	13 November 1998	list^{[A]}
(49705) 1999 VC_{19}	11 November 1999	list^{[A]}
(49976) 1999 YR_{4}	28 December 1999	list^{[A]}
(49977) 1999 YS_{4}	28 December 1999	list^{[A]}
(50767) 2000 FV_{2}	27 March 2000	list
50768 Ianwessen	27 March 2000	list
51569 Garywessen	18 April 2001	list
53316 Michielford	9 May 1999	list
54439 Topeka	29 June 2000	list
(54801) 2001 MT_{17}	24 June 2001	list
56678 Alicewessen	3 June 2000	list
57471 Mariemarsina	22 September 2001	list
(57538) 2001 TW_{13}	12 October 2001	list
(59829) 1999 RZ_{32}	7 September 1999	list^{[A]}
(60268) 1999 XU_{38}	6 December 1999	list^{[A]}
(61192) 2000 OU	23 July 2000	list
62666 Rainawessen	1 October 2000	list
(62992) 2000 WY_{9}	23 November 2000	list
(68184) 2001 BO_{50}	25 January 2001	list
(68472) 2001 SL_{282}	28 September 2001	list
(71956) 2000 WH_{107}	30 November 2000	list
(72054) 2000 YB_{8}	21 December 2000	list
72545 Robbiiwessen	3 March 2001	list

(74592) 1999 PR_{4}	15 August 1999	list
(74593) 1999 PS_{4}	15 August 1999	list
(74595) 1999 QP	20 August 1999	list^{[A]}
(74811) 1999 TH_{5}	1 October 1999	list
(75013) 1999 UJ_{4}	29 October 1999	list^{[A]}
(75071) 1999 VB_{19}	11 November 1999	list^{[A]}
(75076) 1999 VE_{22}	12 November 1999	list^{[A]}
(75551) 1999 YL_{4}	27 December 1999	list^{[A]}
(77886) 2001 SN_{169}	22 September 2001	list
(80993) 2000 EY_{26}	7 March 2000	list
(82186) 2001 HX_{24}	28 April 2001	list
(82569) 2001 OG_{82}	31 July 2001	list
(82654) 2001 PL_{13}	12 August 2001	list
(82655) 2001 PM_{13}	12 August 2001	list
(85877) 1999 CD_{8}	13 February 1999	list^{[A]}
(88240) 2001 CG_{21}	2 February 2001	list
(89843) 2002 CT_{58}	13 February 2002	list
(91529) 1999 RL_{193}	13 September 1999	list^{[A]}
(91903) 1999 VA_{19}	10 November 1999	list^{[A]}
(93963) 2000 XE	1 December 2000	list
(95471) 2002 EE	3 March 2002	list
(97792) 2000 NG_{10}	10 July 2000	list
(99562) 2002 FN_{5}	16 March 2002	list
(101615) 1999 CD_{9}	14 February 1999	list^{[A]}
(102218) 1999 TA_{6}	5 October 1999	list^{[A]}

(102219) 1999 TB_{6}	6 October 1999	list^{[A]}
(102625) 1999 VX_{27}	15 November 1999	list^{[A]}
(105131) 2000 MD_{3}	29 June 2000	list
(105538) 2000 RF_{39}	5 September 2000	list
(106470) 2000 WU_{9}	21 November 2000	list
(106845) 2000 YR_{14}	24 December 2000	list
(108308) 2001 JO_{1}	13 May 2001	list
(109351) 2001 QX_{152}	27 August 2001	list
(109355) 2001 QC_{154}	28 August 2001	list
(109639) 2001 RA	2 September 2001	list
(111817) 2002 DF	16 February 2002	list
(112498) 2002 PU_{11}	8 August 2002	list
(119472) 2001 UM_{16}	25 October 2001	list
(119903) 2002 EE_{6}	12 March 2002	list
120299 Billlynch	9 May 2004	list
(121072) 1999 DP_{3}	17 February 1999	list^{[A]}
(121184) 1999 NH	5 July 1999	list^{[A]}
(121764) 1999 YH_{13}	31 December 1999	list^{[A]}
(122195) 2000 LU_{2}	4 June 2000	list
(126173) 2002 AH_{9}	11 January 2002	list
(126949) 2002 FL_{5}	16 March 2002	list
(127736) 2003 FN_{2}	23 March 2003	list
(128302) 2004 AR_{9}	15 January 2004	list
(129828) 1999 PZ_{3}	13 August 1999	list
(130586) 2000 RG_{78}	9 September 2000	list

(131155) 2001 CC_{10}	2 February 2001	list
(134520) 1999 PK_{3}	12 August 1999	list
(137812) 1999 YU_{14}	31 December 1999	list^{[A]}
(139804) 2001 RH_{16}	10 September 2001	list
(140260) 2001 SG_{263}	25 September 2001	list
(142646) 2002 TG_{190}	14 October 2002	list
(142647) 2002 TH_{190}	14 October 2002	list
(146444) 2001 RB	2 September 2001	list
(148186) 2000 BG	16 January 2000	list^{[A]}
(148485) 2001 JW	12 May 2001	list
(153266) 2001 CH_{21}	11 February 2001	list
(153398) 2001 QQ_{108}	19 August 2001	list
(155835) 2000 YA_{8}	21 December 2000	list
(165587) 2001 FW_{9}	20 March 2001	list
(169077) 2001 HT_{3}	18 April 2001	list
(169260) 2001 SM_{169}	22 September 2001	list
(172676) 2003 YD_{136}	30 December 2003	list
(173444) 2000 LG_{3}	5 June 2000	list
(176163) 2001 JV	12 May 2001	list
(176412) 2001 VW_{1}	9 November 2001	list
(177282) 2003 WQ_{151}	28 November 2003	list
(177954) 2006 OA	16 July 2006	list^{[B]}
(178992) 2001 RM_{2}	9 September 2001	list
(181886) 1999 RP_{32}	9 September 1999	list^{[A]}
(182243) 2001 FV_{9}	20 March 2001	list

(185753) 1999 RM_{193}	13 September 1999	list^{[A]}
(189041) 2000 OR_{2}	24 July 2000	list
(189044) 2000 PB_{3}	1 August 2000	list
(192591) 1999 CE_{8}	13 February 1999	list^{[A]}
(194274) 2001 UL_{16}	25 October 2001	list
(194512) 2001 XR	7 December 2001	list
(195205) 2002 DH	16 February 2002	list
(205538) 2001 SO_{169}	22 September 2001	list
(208268) 2000 WC_{170}	23 November 2000	list
(210917) 2001 SE_{263}	25 September 2001	list
(211398) 2002 VN_{15}	7 November 2002	list
(216935) 1999 RJ_{43}	13 September 1999	list^{[A]}
(217770) 2000 RB_{8}	2 September 2000	list
(222342) 2000 WX_{9}	22 November 2000	list
(222548) 2001 VE_{4}	11 November 2001	list
(225563) 2000 TL_{2}	2 October 2000	list
(228259) 1999 PL_{3}	12 August 1999	list
(229758) 2007 NG	7 July 2007	list
(231776) 1999 XM_{127}	10 December 1999	list^{[A]}
(232885) 2004 XT_{3}	4 December 2004	list
(233592) 2007 RT_{109}	11 September 2007	list
(233722) 2008 SY_{151}	30 September 2008	list
(235902) 2005 DC	16 February 2005	list
(237053) 2008 SD_{149}	28 September 2008	list
(237087) 2008 TJ_{1}	2 October 2008	list

(237796) 2002 BU_{20}	21 January 2002	list
(239278) 2007 OP	17 July 2007	list
(239283) 2007 PG	3 August 2007	list
(241115) 2007 PC_{2}	7 August 2007	list
(241409) 2008 US_{99}	30 October 2008	list
(242664) 2005 ST_{25}	28 September 2005	list
(246641) 2008 YU_{8}	22 December 2008	list
(247139) 2000 WP_{104}	27 November 2000	list
(247346) 2001 VK	5 November 2001	list
(248967) 2007 AF	7 January 2007	list
(249032) 2007 TA	1 October 2007	list
(249477) 2009 OJ_{1}	18 July 2009	list
(253061) 2002 TV_{69}	10 October 2002	list
(256481) 2007 DU_{101}	27 February 2007	list
(256496) 2007 ES_{56}	10 March 2007	list
(256653) 2007 XM_{10}	3 December 2007	list
(257206) 2008 UA	18 October 2008	list
(257368) 2009 OO_{21}	31 July 2009	list
(258167) 2001 SF_{116}	22 September 2001	list
(258371) 2001 XS	7 December 2001	list
(259022) 2002 TF_{190}	13 October 2002	list
(263256) 2008 BB_{15}	27 January 2008	list
(264026) 2009 QO_{11}	22 August 2009	list
(266608) 2008 LT_{16}	14 June 2008	list
(269217) 2008 ND_{1}	1 July 2008	list

(270179) 2001 SH_{263}	25 September 2001	list
(270981) 2002 WN_{11}	28 November 2002	list
(273996) 2007 OQ	17 July 2007	list
(274056) 2007 TP_{24}	11 October 2007	list
(275765) 2001 PT_{29}	12 August 2001	list
(278204) 2007 EH_{34}	10 March 2007	list
(278205) 2007 EJ_{34}	10 March 2007	list
(279131) 2009 QU_{39}	21 August 2009	list
(279849) 2000 YD_{8}	21 December 2000	list
(281238) 2007 KQ	16 May 2007	list
(281251) 2007 NT	9 July 2007	list
(284556) 2007 SD_{11}	22 September 2007	list
(285781) 2000 WW_{9}	22 November 2000	list
(286056) 2001 SK_{282}	28 September 2001	list
(293584) 2007 JV_{2}	9 May 2007	list
(293625) 2007 MD_{4}	17 June 2007	list
(293638) 2007 OR_{7}	26 July 2007	list
(293723) 2007 RT_{13}	11 September 2007	list
(293944) 2007 TQ_{18}	9 October 2007	list
(294511) 2007 XO_{10}	3 December 2007	list
(295467) 2008 QH_{3}	25 August 2008	list
(296076) 2009 BZ_{7}	22 January 2009	list
(296521) 2009 MZ_{8}	29 June 2009	list
(297093) 2010 MD	16 June 2010	list
(298834) 2004 RT_{164}	13 September 2004	list

(300759) 2007 VC_{234}	9 November 2007	list
(300820) 2007 WV_{52}	17 November 2007	list
(300845) 2007 YH_{3}	17 December 2007	list
(300898) 2008 BC_{25}	30 January 2008	list
(304821) 2007 RB	1 September 2007	list
(305845) 2009 EK_{3}	15 March 2009	list
(305871) 2009 FF_{1}	17 March 2009	list
(305882) 2009 FC_{17}	20 March 2009	list
(306056) 2010 GY_{28}	8 April 2010	list
(307506) 2002 YF_{15}	31 December 2002	list
(309236) 2007 RW	3 September 2007	list
(311991) 2007 HH_{5}	20 April 2007	list
(312178) 2007 VX_{9}	5 November 2007	list
(312254) 2008 AL_{2}	3 January 2008	list
(316106) 2009 PM	12 August 2009	list
(316120) 2009 QM_{26}	21 August 2009	list
(316123) 2009 QT_{35}	25 August 2009	list
(320262) 2007 RA	1 September 2007	list
(320430) 2007 VW_{91}	7 November 2007	list
(320591) 2008 BD_{25}	30 January 2008	list
(320869) 2008 GO_{2}	5 April 2008	list
(321037) 2008 QK_{3}	25 August 2008	list
(321363) 2009 MK_{8}	24 June 2009	list
(326317) 1999 VN_{23}	13 November 1999	list^{[A]}
(329344) 2001 QW_{152}	27 August 2001	list

(332411) 2007 PJ_{6}	8 August 2007	list
(332569) 2008 SH	18 September 2008	list
(333173) 2012 CR_{53}	22 March 2002	list
(336074) 2008 FU_{73}	26 September 2001	list
(338452) 2003 FO_{2}	23 March 2003	list
(341173) 2007 RX	3 September 2007	list
(341175) 2007 RP_{8}	8 September 2007	list
(341178) 2007 RG_{12}	11 September 2007	list
(341180) 2007 RY_{16}	13 September 2007	list
(342518) 2008 UY_{199}	31 October 2008	list
(342966) 2009 BA_{10}	18 January 2009	list
(345849) 2007 OW_{3}	18 July 2007	list
(345962) 2007 TM_{24}	11 October 2007	list
(346110) 2007 VA_{92}	7 November 2007	list
(346315) 2008 QE_{24}	30 August 2008	list
(346648) 2008 XQ_{45}	4 December 2008	list
(346740) 2009 BX_{5}	18 January 2009	list
(349327) 2007 VJ	1 November 2007	list
(349330) 2007 VK_{7}	2 November 2007	list
(350344) 2012 UQ_{105}	6 November 1999	list^{[A]}
(350778) 2002 CM_{11}	2 February 2002	list
(352334) 2007 VL_{7}	2 November 2007	list
(352396) 2007 WG_{56}	29 November 2007	list
(352847) 2008 WB_{22}	3 December 2004	list
(353589) 2011 TM_{3}	19 September 2006	list

(358426) 2007 DC_{8}	21 February 2007	list
(359327) 2009 KW_{21}	29 May 2009	list
(360401) 2002 FM_{5}	16 March 2002	list
(362038) 2009 AG_{2}	3 January 2009	list
(364498) 2007 EH_{39}	10 March 2007	list
(365493) 2010 QM_{4}	19 August 2010	list
(369116) 2008 PB_{17}	11 August 2008	list
(370186) 2002 CV_{116}	11 February 2002	list
(371788) 2007 NS	9 July 2007	list
(372161) 2008 TB_{3}	3 October 2008	list
(372646) 2009 WM_{26}	22 November 2009	list
(373498) 2000 YC_{8}	21 December 2000	list
(375149) 2008 BA_{46}	30 January 2008	list
(375335) 2008 SN	18 September 2008	list
(376592) 2013 PX_{27}	7 October 2010	list
(378464) 2007 TP_{15}	3 October 2007	list
(378467) 2007 TK_{24}	11 October 2007	list
(380785) 2005 VW_{5}	6 November 2005	list
(382978) 2005 BW_{2}	18 January 2005	list
(384165) 2009 BB_{10}	21 January 2009	list
(386816) 2010 GP_{23}	5 April 2010	list
(388698) 2007 VJ_{7}	2 November 2007	list
(389061) 2008 WJ	18 November 2008	list
(389519) 2010 GD_{146}	7 April 2010	list
(394434) 2007 PE_{2}	7 August 2007	list

(394565) 2007 VR	1 November 2007	list
(394566) 2007 VB_{12}	6 November 2007	list
(397510) 2007 TB	1 October 2007	list
(400254) 2007 RC	1 September 2007	list
(403386) 2009 QM_{11}	22 August 2009	list
(405060) 2001 TT_{18}	11 October 2001	list
(406820) 2008 XF_{1}	2 December 2008	list
(410685) 2008 WA_{59}	22 November 2008	list
(419017) 2009 QA_{10}	21 August 2009	list
(420533) 2012 FB_{73}	2 April 2002	list
(425278) 2009 WD_{177}	23 November 2009	list
(427440) 2001 OW_{12}	21 July 2001	list
(431438) 2007 RV	3 September 2007	list
(435178) 2007 RM_{8}	8 September 2007	list
(435245) 2007 TM_{22}	9 October 2007	list
(436326) 2010 GP_{32}	8 April 2010	list
(440944) 2007 AH	8 January 2007	list
(441770) 2009 DQ_{3}	19 February 2009	list
(450965) 2008 NW_{3}	13 July 2008	list
(456877) 2007 VY_{91}	7 November 2007	list
(470595) 2008 NM_{3}	13 July 2008	list
(475995) 2007 RR_{8}	8 September 2007	list
(504506) 2008 MX_{1}	30 June 2008	list
(526937) 2007 OR	17 July 2007	list
(527741) 2008 AS_{3}	9 January 2008	list

(529035) 2009 OF_{1}	18 July 2009	list
(529048) 2009 PS_{1}	14 August 2009	list
(545165) 2011 BQ_{37}	28 January 2011	list
(545208) 2011 CR_{9}	18 October 2009	list
(545165) 2011 BQ_{37}	28 January 2011	list
(545208) 2011 CR_{9}	18 October 2009	list
(546213) 2010 TD_{207}	15 October 2010	list
(546746) 2010 XB_{63}	18 July 2009	list
(549116) 2011 CM_{65}	12 February 2011	list
(549637) 2011 QN_{16}	24 August 2011	list
(549704) 2011 SW_{10}	19 September 2011	list
(553073) 2011 BR_{37}	28 January 2011	list
(557019) 2014 SL_{281}	25 March 2009	list
(559743) 2015 DQ_{187}	6 October 2007	list
(564021) 2016 EC_{235}	26 December 2013	list
(568576) 2004 HE_{80}	10 March 2007	list
(575372) 2011 SX_{112}	19 September 2011	list
(575815) 2011 WJ_{32}	10 August 2007	list
(582971) 2016 CW_{294}	25 July 2012	list
(583438) 2016 GU_{231}	1 April 2006	list
(584199) 2016 TR_{67}	5 August 2010	list
(586502) 2003 TV_{9}	15 October 2003	list
(587578) 2006 GG_{1}	1 April 2006	list
(587989) 2007 EJ_{39}	10 March 2007	list
(588145) 2007 RO_{8}	8 September 2007	list

(589290) 2009 SN_{297}	28 September 2009	list
(589953) 2010 WJ_{64}	14 November 2010	list
(592449) 2014 WW_{273}	30 January 2008	list
(592549) 2015 AG_{189}	22 May 2001	list
(597278) 2006 WO_{225}	23 December 2011	list
(597837) 2007 VG_{247}	9 November 2007	list
(598168) 2008 GF_{3}	7 April 2008	list
(598381) 2008 RQ_{79}	2 September 2008	list
(598516) 2008 UZ_{90}	25 October 2008	list
(599680) 2010 TJ_{78}	8 October 2010	list
(599848) 2010 XS_{23}	1 December 2002	list
(599957) 2011 CC_{19}	25 September 2009	list
(603342) 2015 BP_{477}	3 February 2010	list
(607140) 1999 SQ_{28}	21 September 1999	list^{[A]}
(607690) 2002 GT_{1}	5 April 2002	list
(611658) 2007 DO_{46}	21 February 2007	list
(612542) 2003 FP_{2}	23 March 2003	list
(614450) 2009 QB_{40}	25 August 2009	list
(614857) 2000 RP_{110}	14 November 2010	list
(621019) 2007 PH_{6}	8 August 2007	list
(621345) 2008 SE_{149}	28 September 2008	list
(621563) 2009 QH_{11}	13 August 2009	list
(631554) 2007 QU_{2}	22 August 2007	list
(633287) 2009 OK_{1}	19 July 2009	list
(633999) 2010 VH_{137}	15 October 2010	list

(635509) 2013 SQ_{29}	12 May 2001	list
(638751) 2016 DN_{14}	3 February 2010	list
(639427) 2017 DM_{80}	28 December 1999	list ^{[A]}
(645036) 2007 DP_{46}	21 February 2007	list
(646134) 2008 AT_{3}	9 January 2008	list
(649642) 2011 QQ_{38}	25 August 2011	list
(651765) 2013 FM_{5}	8 March 2013	list
(653486) 2014 QG_{84}	22 August 2009	list
(655861) 2015 RO_{244}	18 July 2007	list
(659066) 2018 RO_{49}	11 September 2018	list
(662738) 2006 SU_{141}	26 September 2006	list
(663780) 2007 VN_{7}	2 November 2007	list
(664407) 2008 MW_{1}	29 June 2008	list
(664817) 2008 US_{95}	29 October 2008	list
(665058) 2008 XJ_{1}	2 December 2008	list
(665495) 2009 QX_{8}	20 August 2009	list
(665679) 2009 SZ_{208}	26 December 2006	list
(665825) 2009 UW_{1}	16 October 2009	list
(666862) 2010 VR_{106}	15 October 2010	list
(668031) 2011 UN_{151}	22 October 2011	list
(668091) 2011 UR_{258}	23 October 2011	list
(668575) 2012 BQ_{141}	26 January 2012	list
(668979) 2012 QX_{9}	17 August 2012	list
(672050) 2014 QK_{447}	3 February 2011	list
(672543) 2014 VS_{15}	14 November 2014	list

(676594) 2016 JV_{20}	22 May 2012	list
(685438) 2009 SU_{317}	23 August 2009	list
(685976) 2010 GO_{23}	5 April 2010	list
(689442) 2013 GG_{117}	5 April 2013	list
(700728) 2002 VX_{56}	6 November 2002	list
(702695) 2006 SO_{20}	19 September 2006	list
(702738) 2006 SE_{276}	29 September 2006	list
(703370) 2007 RZ	3 September 2007	list
(703555) 2007 TD_{16}	6 October 2007	list
(705931) 2009 SO_{295}	27 September 2009	list
(706030) 2009 UV_{1}	16 October 2009	list
(706645) 2010 NY_{6}	7 July 2010	list
(707414) 2011 FP_{14}	8 September 2007	list
(708470) 2012 DD_{50}	27 February 2008	list
(710743) 2014 DD_{155}	29 December 2008	list
(717629) 2016 VT_{19}	21 December 2012	list
(725816) 2009 FH_{43}	29 March 2009	list
(725817) 2009 FJ_{45}	29 March 2009	list
(726216) 2009 UC_{92}	24 October 2009	list
(728960) 2010 VQ_{169}	27 October 2009	list
(728998) 2010 WG_{64}	6 November 2010	list
(729225) 2011 CC_{16}	3 February 2011	list
(730052) 2011 UY_{264}	19 September 2006	list
(739562) 2017 XS_{79}	5 April 2010	list
(744394) 2009 QV_{29}	21 August 2009	list

(745294) 2010 WR_{6}	15 October 2010	list
(749897) 2014 QA_{51}	14 October 2006	list
(750120) 2014 RE_{12}	16 August 2015	list
(752561) 2015 RQ_{63}	27 March 2001	list
(763892) 2012 RQ_{48}	10 September 2012	list
(775853) 2007 FK_{5}	14 March 2007	list^{[B]}
(784147) 2014 YZ_{57}	1 March 2011	list
(793197) 2001 TO_{1}	11 October 2001	list
(795636) 2008 NX_{3}	13 July 2008	list
(796218) 2009 OL_{1}	18 July 2009	list
(796973) 2010 VA_{139}	15 October 2010	list
(798443) 2012 QS_{8}	27 July 2012	list
(799207) 2013 EW_{164}	6 March 2013	list
(816662) 2011 SZ_{118}	21 September 2011	list
(816784) 2011 UF_{59}	5 September 2011	list
(817420) 2012 NF	21 November 2008	list
(829892) 2007 RA_{1}	3 September 2007	list
(830021) 2007 TA_{5}	3 October 2007	list
(830286) 2007 YF_{3}	17 December 2007	list
(831736) 2009 WV_{6}	18 November 2009	list
(835208) 2011 DX_{13}	29 January 2011	list
(836335) 2012 LA_{2}	8 June 2012	list
(836409) 2012 QY_{9}	20 August 2012	list
(850258) 2006 UF_{369}	24 October 2006	list^{[B]}
(857008) 2012 BV_{164}	24 January 2012	list

(875912) 2006 SC_{110}	20 September 2006	list
Co-discovery made with:^{A} G. Bell ^{B} D. Tibbets
