= 177P/Barnard =

Halley-type comet

Discovery
- Discovered by: Edward Emerson Barnard
- Discovery site: Lick Observatory
- Discovery date: 24 June 1889

Designations
- MPC designation: P/1889 M1; P/2006 M3
- Alternative designations: Barnard 2; 1889 III, 1889c

Orbital characteristics
- Epoch: 21 November 2025 (JD 2461000.5)
- Observation arc: 117.47 years (Note: Observation arc from the Minor Planet Center database covering dates from 24 June 1889 until 11 December 2006.)
- Number of observations: 1,911
- Aphelion: 47.848 AU
- Perihelion: 1.125 AU
- Semi-major axis: 24.502 AU
- Eccentricity: 0.95408
- Orbital period: ~121 years
- Inclination: 30.959°
- Longitude of ascending node: 271.59°
- Argument of periapsis: 61.043°
- Mean anomaly: 57.092°
- Last perihelion: 28 August 2006
- Next perihelion: 13 April 2127
- T_{Jupiter}: 1.317
- Earth MOID: 0.310 AU
- Jupiter MOID: 0.349 AU
- Comet total magnitude (M1): 15.7
- Comet nuclear magnitude (M2): 18.3

Comet 177P/Barnard, also known as Barnard 2, is a Halley-type comet with an orbital period of 122 years. It fits the classical definition of a Halley-type comet with (20 years < period < 200 years). It orbits near the ecliptic plane and has aphelion near the Kuiper cliff at 48 AU (7.2 billion km).

== Observational history ==
The comet, also designated P/2006 M3, was discovered by Edward Emerson Barnard on 24 June 1889, and was re-discovered after 116 years. On July 19, 2006, 177P came within 0.366 AU (54.8 million km) of Earth. From late July through September 2006 it was slightly brighter than expected at 8th magnitude in the constellations Hercules and then Draco. Perihelion was August 28, 2006. It was last observed in December 2006 when it was about 2 AU (300 million km) from the Sun.

The only numbered comets with an orbital period longer than 177P/Barnard are: 153P/Ikeya–Zhang (365 years), 273P/Pons–Gambart (188 years), 35P/Herschel–Rigollet (155 years), and 109P/Swift-Tuttle (133 years).

Of Barnard's other two periodic comets, the first, D/1884 O1 (Barnard 1) was last seen on November 20, 1884, and is thought to have disintegrated. The last, 206P/Barnard–Boattini marked the beginning of a new era in cometary astronomy, as it was the first to be discovered by photography. It was a lost comet after 1892, until accidentally rediscovered on 7 October 2008, by Andrea Boattini.

== Meteor shower ==
A 2011 study proposed that 177P/Barnard may have been one of two progenitor bodies of the Kappa Cygnids meteor shower alongside C/1905 F1 (Giacobini). However, orbital reconstructions show that it is more associated with the asteroid 361861 (2008 ED_{69}) instead.

== Notes ==
Numbered comets
Previous; 176P/LINEAR	177P/Barnard	Next; 178P/Hug-Bell
