= 776 Berbericia =

Main-belt asteroid

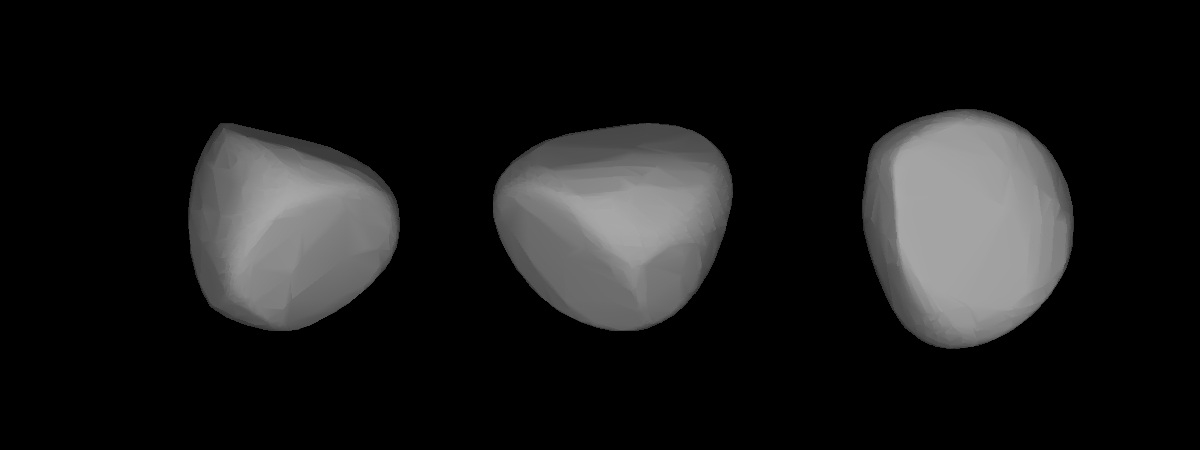
- A three-dimensional model of 776 Berbericia based on its light curve.

Discovery
- Discovered by: A. Massinger
- Discovery site: Heidelberg Obs.
- Discovery date: 24 January 1914

Designations
- Pronunciation: /bɜːrbəˈrɪʃiə/
- Alternative designations: 1914 TY
- Adjectives: Berberician

Orbital characteristics
- Epoch 31 July 2016 (JD 2457600.5)
- Uncertainty parameter 0
- Observation arc: 102.05 yr (37275 d)
- Aphelion: 3.4131 AU (510.59 Gm)
- Perihelion: 2.4477 AU (366.17 Gm)
- Semi-major axis: 2.9304 AU (438.38 Gm)
- Eccentricity: 0.16471
- Orbital period (sidereal): 5.02 yr (1832.3 d)
- Mean anomaly: 235.69°
- Mean motion: 0° 11^{m} 47.328^{s} / day
- Inclination: 18.237°
- Longitude of ascending node: 79.729°
- Argument of perihelion: 307.132°

Physical characteristics
- Mean diameter: 150.92±3.20 km (composite estimate); 151.711±0.878 km
- Mass: (3.13±0.24)×10^{18} kg (Note: Calculated from its standard gravitational parameter GM = 0.209±0.016 km^{3}/s^{2}.)
- Mean density: 1.71 g/cm^{3} (Note: Assuming a diameter of 152 km.)
- Synodic rotation period: 7.66701 h 7.668 h (0.3195 d)
- Geometric albedo: 0.065±0.008
- Spectral type: C (Tholen)
- Absolute magnitude (H): 7.75

776 Berbericia is a minor planet orbiting the Sun. A main-belt C-type asteroid, it was discovered on 24 January 1914 by astronomer Adam Massinger at Heidelberg Observatory in southwest Germany. It was named by Max Wolf in honor of Adolf Berberich (1861–1920), a German astronomer. The spectra of the asteroid displays evidence of aqueous alteration.

== Description ==
In the late 1990s, a network of astronomers worldwide gathered lightcurve data that was ultimately used to derive the spin states and shape models of 10 new asteroids, including (776) Berbericia. The computed shape model for this asteroid is described as "asymmetric with sharp edges".

Richard P. Binzel and Schelte Bus further added to the knowledge about this asteroid in a lightwave survey published in 2003. This project was known as Small Main-belt Asteroid Spectroscopic Survey, Phase II or SMASSII, which built on a previous survey of the main-belt asteroids. The visible-wavelength (0.435-0.925 micrometre) spectra data was gathered between August 1993 and March 1999.
