= 418 Alemannia =

Main-belt asteroid

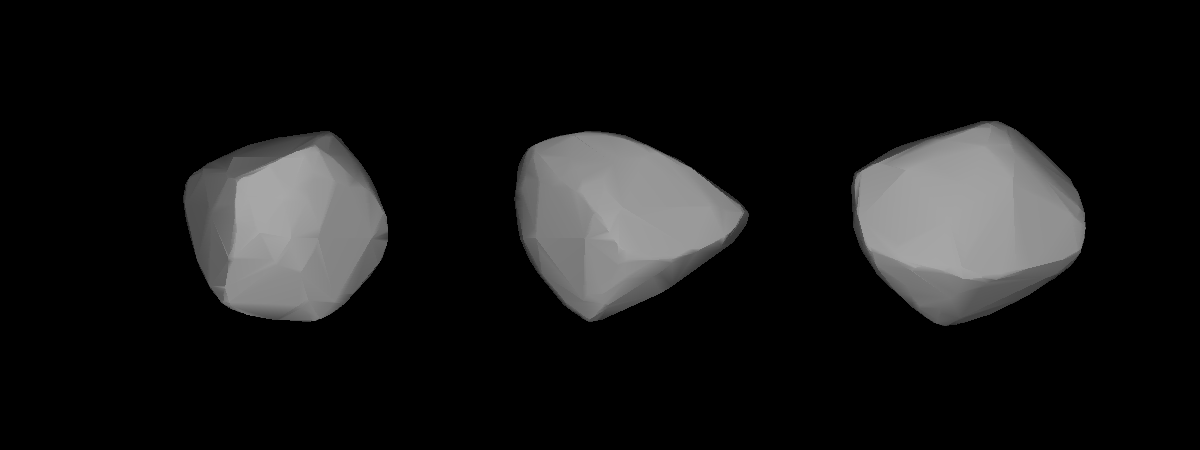
- Lightcurve-base 3D-model of 418 Alemannia.

Discovery
- Discovered by: M. F. Wolf
- Discovery site: Heidelberg Obs.
- Discovery date: 7 September 1896

Designations
- Pronunciation: /æləˈmæniə/
- Named after: Alemannia (student fraternity)
- Alternative designations: 1896 CV
- Minor planet category: main-belt · (middle) background

Orbital characteristics
- Epoch 4 September 2017 (JD 2458000.5)
- Uncertainty parameter 0
- Observation arc: 111.94 yr (40,886 days)
- Aphelion: 2.9024 AU
- Perihelion: 2.2829 AU
- Semi-major axis: 2.5927 AU
- Eccentricity: 0.1195
- Orbital period (sidereal): 4.17 yr (1,525 days)
- Mean anomaly: 327.11°
- Mean motion: 0° 14^{m} 9.96^{s} / day
- Inclination: 6.8178°
- Longitude of ascending node: 248.83°
- Argument of perihelion: 126.68°

Physical characteristics
- Dimensions: 32.98±1.04 km 34.10±4.6 km 40.12±0.62 km 40.330±0.578 km 45.448±0.509 km
- Synodic rotation period: 4.67±0.05 h 4.671 h 4.6714±0.0001 h 4.6727±0.0003 h 4.680±0.024 h 5.82 h (poor)
- Geometric albedo: 0.1057±0.0158; 0.137±0.005; 0.1878±0.062; 0.201±0.027
- Spectral type: Tholen = M · M B–V = 0.703; U–B = 0.225
- Absolute magnitude (H): 9.77 · 9.83±0.32

418 Alemannia, provisional designation 1896 CV, is a metallic background asteroid from the central region of the asteroid belt, approximately 35 kilometers in diameter. It was discovered by German astronomer Max Wolf at Heidelberg Observatory in southern Germany on 7 September 1896 and named for the student fraternity Alemannia in Heidelberg.

== Orbit and classification ==
Alemannia is a non-family asteroid from the main belt's background population. It orbits the Sun in the intermediate main-belt at a distance of 2.3–2.9 AU once every 4 years and 2 months (1,525 days; semi-major axis of 2.59 AU). Its orbit has an eccentricity of 0.12 and an inclination of 7° with respect to the ecliptic. The body's observation arc begins at Heidelberg in December 1905, more than 9 years after its official discovery observation.

== Physical characteristics ==
In the Tholen classification, Alemannia is a metallic M-type asteroid. The Wide-field Infrared Survey Explorer (WISE) also characterized it as an M-type.

=== Rotation period ===
The best-rated photometric lightcurve observations gave a rotation period of 4.671 hours with a brightness amplitude between 0.20 and 0.33 magnitude (U=3), superseding previous observations that gave a period of 5.82 and 4.68 hours, respectively.

=== Diameter and albedo ===
According to the surveys carried out by the Infrared Astronomical Satellite IRAS, the Japanese Akari satellite and the NEOWISE mission of NASA's WISE telescope, Alemannia measures between 32.98 and 45.448 kilometers in diameter and its surface has an albedo between 0.1057 and 0.201.

The Collaborative Asteroid Lightcurve Link adopts the results obtained by IRAS, that is, an albedo of 0.1878 and a diameter of 34.1 kilometers based on an absolute magnitude of 9.77.

== Naming ==
This minor planet was named for the student fraternity Alemannia in Heidelberg, Germany. It was named by German astronomer Adolf Berberich (1861–1920) in 1901. The official naming citation was mentioned in The Names of the Minor Planets by Paul Herget in 1955 (H 45).
