= Fritz Cohn =

German astronomer (1866–1922)

- Born: Fritz Cohn; 12 May 1866; Königsberg, Prussia
- Died: 14 December 1922 (aged 56); Berlin, Germany
- Education: University of Königsberg; University of Berlin
- Spouse: Johanna Peters (m. 1897)
- Children: Jürgen Peters; 2 daughters
- Scientific career
- Fields: Astronomy
- Workplaces: Königsberg Observatory (1891–1909); University of Königsberg (1893–1909); University of Berlin (1909–1922); Astronomical Calculation Institute (1909–1922)
- Thesis: Über Lamésche Funktionen mit komplexen Parametern (About Lamé functions with complex parameters) (1888)

Fritz Cohn, RAS Associate (12 May 1866 – 14 December 1922) was a German astronomer and professor of astronomy at the University of Berlin. Throughout his career he worked at numerous observatories and was director of the Astronomical Calculation Institute. His main work was in astrometry and minor planets, although he published star catalogues and oversaw the production of journals in his later life.

The minor planet 972 Cohnia is named in honour of him.

== Early life ==
Fritz Cohn was born on 12 May 1866 in Königsberg, Prussia, the second of three sons to the merchant Callman Cohn and his wife Henriette Rosenberg. When he was 11 his father died, after which his family experienced serious financial troubles. From 1872 he attended the Altstadt Gymnasium in his hometown, passing his matriculation exam in Easter 1883, at the age of 17. The following years were devoted to the study of mathematics, physics, and astronomy, as well as geography and history, at the University of Königsberg and the University of Berlin. In 1888 he passed Königsberg's state examinations and later in the same year attained a PhD with a thesis titled "Über Lamésche Funktionen mit komplexen Parametern" ("About Lamé functions with complex parameters").

== Career and later life ==
On 1 July 1891 he began working as a "computer" at the Königsberg Observatory. Save for a year's leave to further his studies in Leipzig, Cohn remained at the observatory until 1 October 1909, being promoted to an assistantship in 1898 and becoming a full-time observer in 1900. During this time he published numerous academic papers, among the major works being a discussion of the meteorological records of Königsberg for 45 years, a new reduction of observations made by Friedrich Bessel between 1813 and 1819, and a study of the declinations and proper motions of the stars selected for observation by the International Latitude Service. In 1893 he also attained the habilitation with a thesis titled "Über die in rekurrierender Weise gebildeten Größen und ihren Zusammenhang mit den algebraischen Gleichungen" ("On Recurring Values and Their Connection with Algebraic Equations"), allowing him to teach astronomy and mathematics at the University of Königsberg, leading to Cohn becoming an associate professor in 1985. While at the observatory, he observed double stars with the Königsberg heliometer and, while at Leipzig, determined the latitude of the observatory with the Wanschaff universal instrument, the results of which he published in the Berichte of the Scientific Association of Saxony. He also compiled two star catalogues of the right ascensions of stars. The first of these catalogues was of the reference stars used during the opposition of Eros (1900 – 1901) to measure the asteroid's distance to the Sun and the other was of 4066 stars from his observations with the transit micrometer of the Repsold meridian circle, which he improved by installing a clock-work system. His right ascension computations were considered "among the best of their kind."

In 1905 and 1907 respectively, Cohn authored two articles for the mathematical encyclopedia Enzyklopädie der mathematischen Wissenschaften, titled "Reduktion der astronomische Beobachtungen – sphärische Astronomie im engeren Sinne" ("Spherical astronomy and the Reduction of Observations") and "Theorie der astronomischen Winkelmessinstrumente, der Beobachtungsmethoden und ihrer Fehler" ("On the Theory of Astronomical Instruments for Measuring Angles, Methods of Observation and their Errors"). In 1905 he was also appointed extraordinary professor at Königsberg and in 1909 was promoted to the Chair of Astronomy at the University of Berlin and to the position of director at the Astronomical Calculation Institute, where he also oversaw the production of the Berliner Astronomisches Jahrbuch, an ephemeris. As director of an ephemeris, Cohn attended the Paris Conference of Directors of National Ephemerides in 1911, (Note: The Paris Conference of Directors of National Ephemerides was a meeting held on 23 October 1911. On the initiative of the Bureau des Longitudes, the directors of various national ephemerides were invited by Benjamin Baillaud, director of the Paris Observatory, to assemble in Paris. The objective of the meeting was to decide how the scope and efficiency of the various ephemerides could be improved. A number of leading practical astronomers were also invited to represent the needs of the greater astronomical community.) where it was, among other resolutions, decided that Greenwich Mean Time would be the standard used in all ephemerides and that international cooperation was to be organised to prevent redundant work. The resolutions decided at the conference reduced the workload of the institute and allowed Cohn to focus his resources towards studying the minor planets, which the institute was best known for. With the number of minor planets rapidly increasing, and the inaccuracies of past observations leading to them being frequently lost, Cohn created a principle under which, with the exception of preliminary computations, all orbits were to have an accuracy of ±15° in longitude. He personally oversaw the implementation of this principle and found success, reclaiming many objects believed to be lost. Even in the final year of his life he repeatedly affirmed that he planned to reclaim most lost minor planets within a few years. During this period he also restructured how the Berliner Jahrbuch was to be produced and in its next installment it provided positions for all minor planets passing opposition in the coming year.

On 13 June 1913 he was elected an associate of the Royal Astronomical Society and in 1918 he published a paper outlining some practical improvements to the methods of orbit computation.

Following the death of Adolf Berberich in 1920, Cohn sought to continue the Astronomischer Jahresbericht journal and negotiated with the Astronomische Gesellschaft and the German government to have it added to the workload of the institute. He was successful. He personally undertook the editing of the 1910 and 1916 issues and completed the manuscript for the 1921 issue shortly before his death.

By the end of his life, Cohn was a highly respected observational astronomer and held high esteem among those in his field. German astronomers Max Wolf and Gustav Stracke named the minor planet 972 Cohnia in honour of him, saying:

Der Planet 972 hat zum Andenken an den verstorbenen Direktor des Astronomischen Rechen-Instituts zu Berlin-Dahlem, Professor F. Cohn, den Namen erhalten. Es ist dies nur ein schwacher Ausdruck für die großen Verdienste, die sich Cohn gerade auf dem Gebiete der Kleinen Planeten erworben hat. The planet 972 received the name in memory of the deceased director of the Astronomical Calculation Institute, Professor F. Cohn. This is only a weak expression of the great merit that Cohn has acquired in the field of minor planets.

Upon his return home from a lecture given on 11 December 1922, Cohn suddenly encountered serious stomach pain and underwent surgery the following morning. He died in the aftermath of the operation attempt, on 14 December. It is likely that the illness was unnoticed stomach cancer.

== Personal life ==
Outside of his work as an astronomer, Cohn was known as an avid gardener, often spending hours tending his plants.

=== Family ===
Cohn was born into a Protestant family. His father was Callman Cohn (died 1877), a merchant in Königsberg, and his mother was Henriette Rosenberg. He was a middle child, having both a younger and older brother.

In 1897 he married Johanna Peters (1871 – 1955), the daughter of Carl Friedrich Wilhelm Peters, who directed the Königsberg Observatory from 1888 to 1894. They had a son whom they named Jürgen (1905 – 1982) as well as two daughters. Jürgen became a physicist and married Ruth Steinitz (1903 – 1984) in 1939.

=== Personality ===
Those who came in contact with Cohn often found him to be an agreeable, sociable, and intellectually stimulating person. J. Peters, a colleague and friend who wrote Cohn's most comprehensive obituary, said the following of him:

Sein stetes heiteres und liebenswürdiges Wesen bewirkte, dass jeder, der in seinem überaus gastfreien Hause verkehrte, sich sofort behaglich und angehimmelt fühlen musste. Bei all seinen wissenschaftlichen Leistungen war der Verstorbene äußerst bescheiden und trat wenig nach aussen hervor, sodass wohl mancher, der ihm zum ersten Male im Leben begegnete, erstaunt gewesen sein wird über so tiefes Wissen und so gründliche Gelehrsamkeit. His constant cheerful and amiable nature caused everyone who was in his very hospitable home to feel immediately at ease and calm. In all his scientific achievements the deceased was exceedingly modest and boasted little, so that many who met him for the first time in his life would have been astonished by his profound knowledge.

Paul Viktor Neugebauer, who also described Cohn as "socially inclined" and "a most agreeable companion," said the following:

He never attempted to influence the work of others, leaving each one free to choose his own line of work, even though these were not in accord with his personal interests. Because of his own independent nature he valued independence in others; accustomed to speak his own mind freely he delighted to discuss subjects with those having opposing opinions, which he often brought out by asserting the contrary.

== Honours ==
=== Namesakes ===
- 972 Cohnia, named by Max Wolf and Gustav Stracke;

=== Memberships ===
- Associate of the Royal Astronomical Society on 13 June 1913;

== Memorials ==
=== Obituaries ===
- "Obituary Notices: Associates: Cohn, Fritz". Monthly Notices of the Royal Astronomical Society. 83: 249. 1923. Bibcode:1923MNRAS..83R.249.. doi:10.1093/mnras/83.4.249. ISSN 0035-8711.
- Peters, J. (1922). "Anzeige des Todes von Fritz Cohn" [Display of Death of Fritz Cohn]. Astronomische Nachrichten. 217 (24): 473–476. Bibcode:1923AN....217..473P. doi:10.1002/asna.19222172405. ISSN 0004-6337.
- Neugebauer, Paul Viktor (1923). "Fritz Cohn". Popular Astronomy. 31: 293. Bibcode:1923PA.....31..293N. ISSN 0197-7482.
- A. C. D. C. (1923). "Prof. Fritz Cohn". Nature. 88 (2780): 194. Bibcode:1923Natur.111..194A. doi:10.1038/111194a0. ISSN 0028-0836. S2CID 4120743.

=== Other biographies ===
- "Cohn, Fritz - Deutsche Biographie". Deutsche Biographie.

== Publications ==
An extensive list of Cohn's publications can be found on the Astrophysics Data System.

== See also ==
- Adolf Berberich, long-time friend and colleague of Cohn.
- 1052 Belgica, a minor planet which Cohn had an interesting role in naming.
