= 972 Cohnia =

Main-belt asteroid

Discovery
- Discovered by: Max Wolf
- Discovery site: Heidelberg
- Discovery date: 18 January 1922

Designations
- Pronunciation: /ˈkoʊniə/
- Alternative designations: 1922 LK

Orbital characteristics
- Epoch 31 July 2016 (JD 2457600.5)
- Uncertainty parameter 0
- Observation arc: 110.24 yr (40266 days)
- Aphelion: 3.7748 AU (564.70 Gm)
- Perihelion: 2.3388 AU (349.88 Gm)
- Semi-major axis: 3.0568 AU (457.29 Gm)
- Eccentricity: 0.23487
- Orbital period (sidereal): 5.34 yr (1952.1 d)
- Mean anomaly: 294.244°
- Mean motion: 0° 11^{m} 3.912^{s} / day
- Inclination: 8.3709°
- Longitude of ascending node: 281.530°
- Argument of perihelion: 93.837°

Physical characteristics
- Mean radius: 37.825±0.95 km
- Synodic rotation period: 18.472 h (0.7697 d)
- Geometric albedo: 0.0489±0.003
- Absolute magnitude (H): 9.50

972 Cohnia is a minor planet orbiting the Sun, one of several such in the asteroid belt. It was discovered on 18 January 1908 by a team in Heidelberg led by Max Wolf. In 2007, lightcurve data showed that Cohnia rotates every 18.472 ± 0.004 hours.

It is named after the German astronomer Fritz Cohn.
