= Barnard 5 =

Barnard 5 is a dark nebula in the constellation of Perseus. Barnard 5 has several star forming regions inside of it. The right ascension and declination is 0^{h.}47^{m} and +32°53'

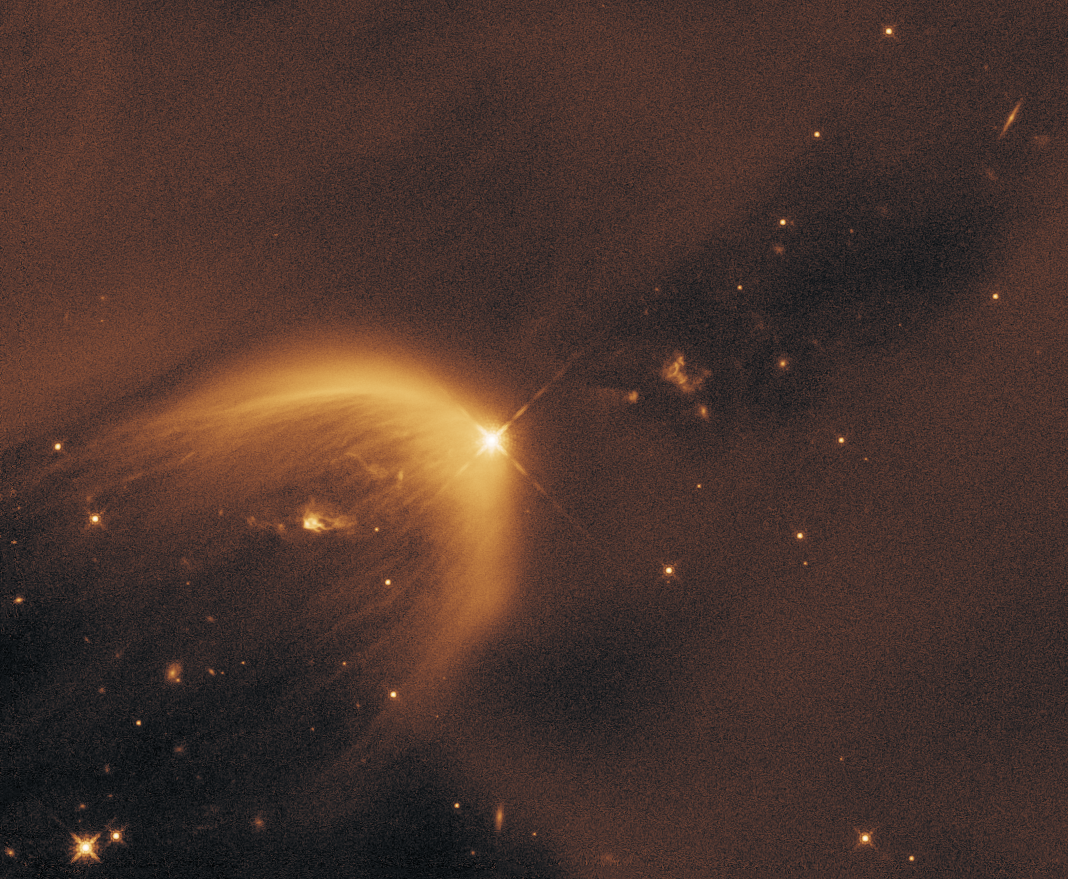
Young Stellar Object in LDN 1471
