= C/1891 F1 (Barnard–Denning) =

Parabolic comet

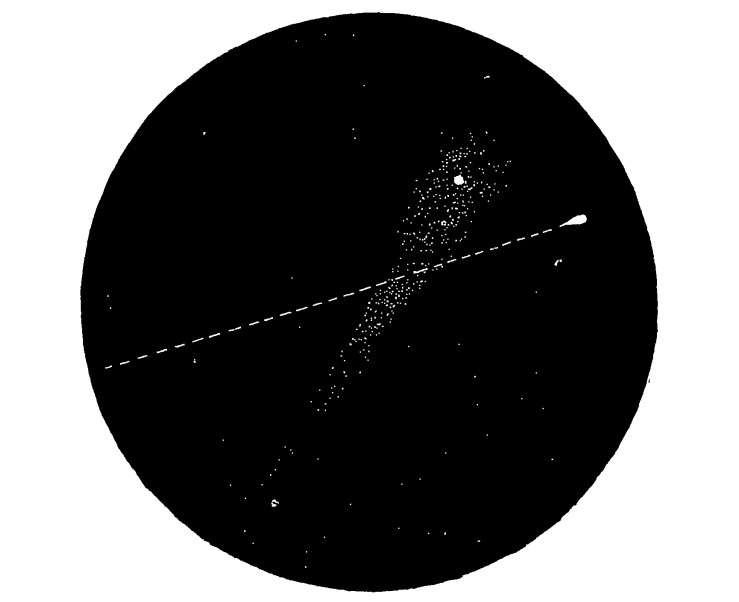
- Comet Barnard–Denning as sketched by William F. Denning on 4 April 1891, alongside a passing meteor.

Discovery
- Discovered by: Edward E. Barnard; William F. Denning
- Discovery site: Lick Observatory, California; Bristol, England
- Discovery date: 30 March 1891

Designations
- Alternative designations: 1891 I, 1891a

Orbital characteristics
- Epoch: 28 April 1891 (JD 2411850.5)
- Observation arc: 101 days
- Number of observations: 110
- Perihelion: 0.398 AU
- Eccentricity: ~1.000
- Inclination: 120.512°
- Longitude of ascending node: 195.454°
- Argument of periapsis: 178.750°
- Last perihelion: 28 April 1891

Physical characteristics
- Comet total magnitude (M1): 8.8
- Comet nuclear magnitude (M2): 9.5
- Apparent magnitude: 8.0 (1891 apparition)

Comet Barnard–Denning, also known as C/1891 F1 by its modern nomenclature, is a parabolic comet that was observed through telescopes between March and July 1891. It was discovered by American astronomer, Edward Emerson Barnard, and British astronomer, William Frederick Denning.

== Discovery and observations ==
Edward Emerson Barnard was in the Lick Observatory looking for new comets in the northwestern sky when he spotted this comet on the early morning of 30 March 1891, describing it as a "small, faint nebulous object" within the constellation Cetus. (Note: Reported initial position upon discovery was: α = 1^{h} 00.1^{m} , δ = 44° 48′) William Frederick Denning independently discovered the comet approximately 17 hours after Barnard did.

John M. Thome and his colleague, Richard H. Tucker were the last astronomers to have seen Comet Barnard–Denning, where they observed the comet from the Cordoba Observatory on 9 July 1891 as a faint object within the constellation Vela. (Note: Reported positions upon final observations were: α = 9^{h} 52^{m} , δ = –45° 34′)

== Orbit ==
The first orbital calculations for C/1891 F1 were written by Adolf Berberich, using positions recorded between 31 March and 2 April 1891. The comet reached perihelion on 28 April 1891. Due to the very few follow-up observations conducted, its retrograde trajectory was not fully determined, however it is assumed to be parabolic.
