= NGC 1723 =

Barred spiral galaxy in Eridanus

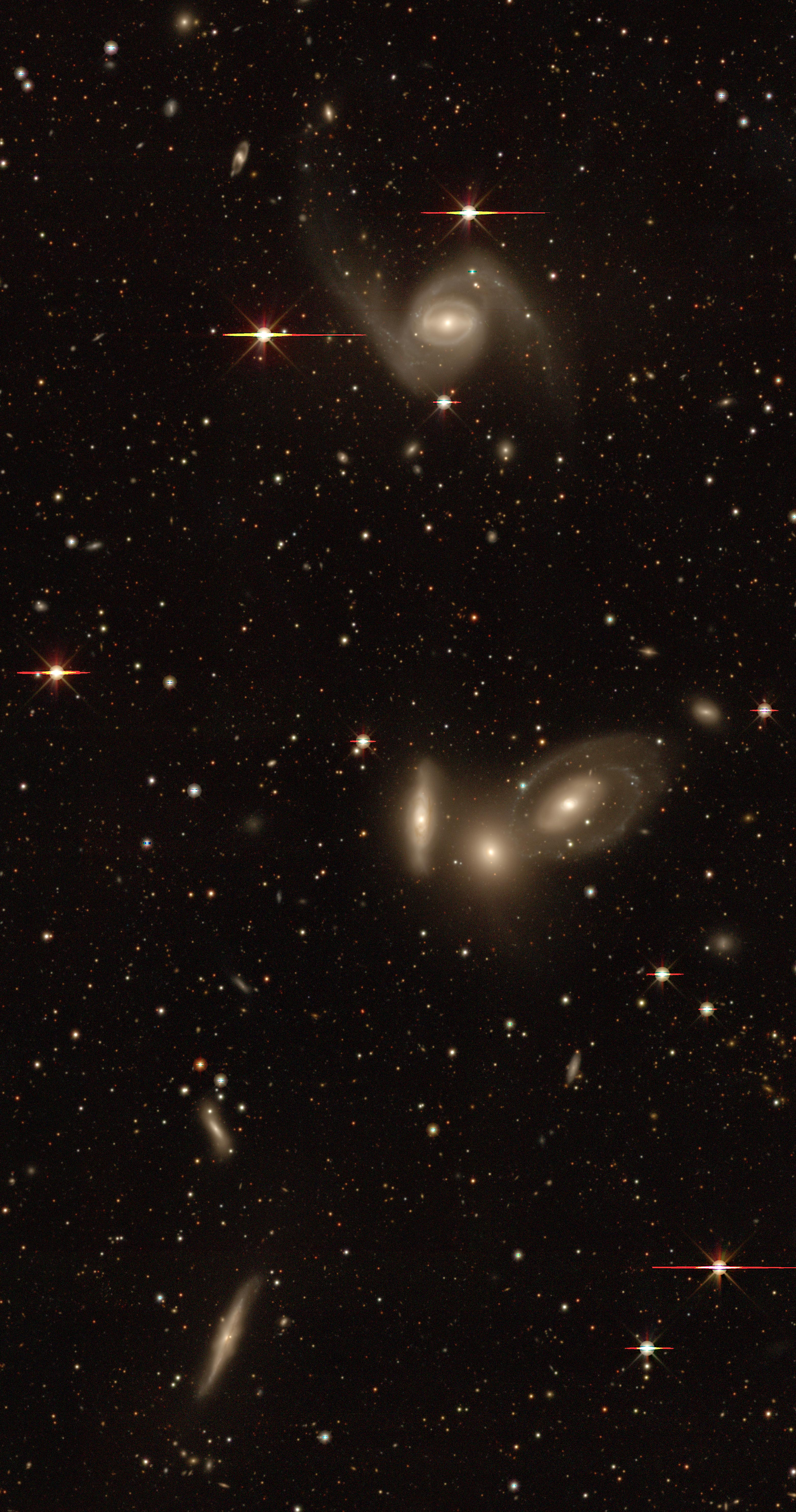
- Galaxy group in Eridanus showing NGC 1721, NGC 1723, NGC 1725, and NGC 1728. NGC 1723 is the large galaxy at the top.

Observation data (J2000 epoch)
- Constellation: Eridanus
- Right ascension: 04^{h} 59^{m} 25.9^{s}
- Declination: −10° 58′ 50″
- Redshift: 0.012479
- Heliocentric radial velocity: 3741±7 km/s
- Galactocentric velocity: 3630±8 km/s
- Distance: 166.3 Mly (51.0 Mpc) h^{−1}_{0.73}
- Apparent magnitude (B): 12.5

Characteristics
- Type: SB(r)a pec
- Size: 46.88 × 29.30 h^{−1}_{0.73} kpc

Other designations
- MCG -02-13-029, PGC 16493

NGC 1723 is a barred spiral galaxy in the constellation Eridanus. The galaxy is listed in the New General Catalogue. It was discovered on September 13, 1863, by the astronomer Albert Marth.
