= 207P/NEAT =

Jupiter-family comet

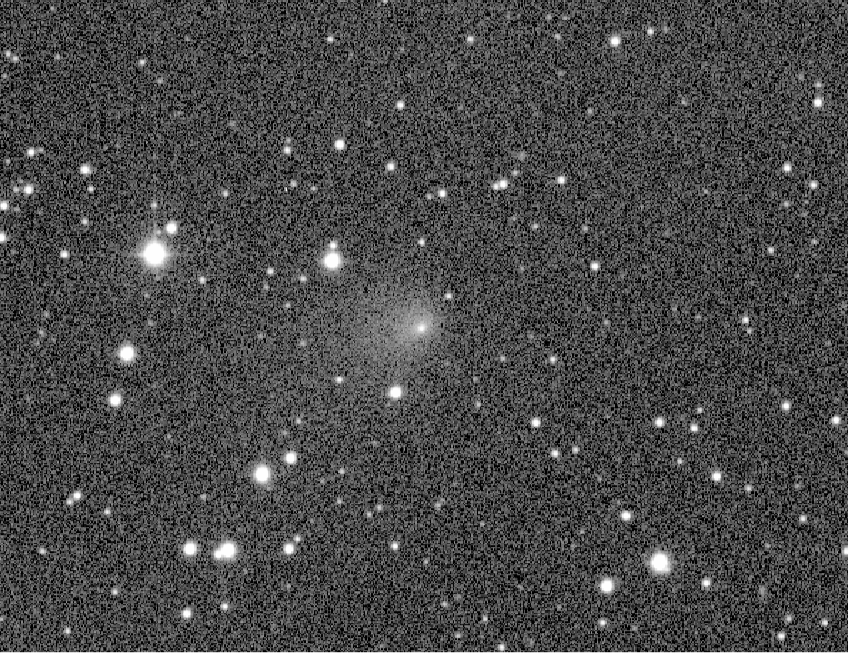
- Comet 207P/NEAT imaged from the Zwicky Transient Facility on 5 March 2024

Discovery
- Discovered by: Near Earth Asteroid Tracking (NEAT)
- Discovery date: 11 March 2001

Designations
- MPC designation: P/2001 J1, P/2008 T5
- Alternative designations: NEAT 4

Orbital characteristics
- Epoch: 21 November 2025 (JD 2461000.5)
- Observation arc: 23.65 years (Note: Observation arc from the Minor Planet Center database covering dates from 7 October 2000 until 30 May 2024.)
- Earliest precovery date: 7 October 2000
- Number of observations: 1,018
- Aphelion: 6.835 AU
- Perihelion: 0.938 AU
- Semi-major axis: 3.887 AU
- Eccentricity: 0.75854
- Orbital period: 7.663 years
- Inclination: 10.197°
- Longitude of ascending node: 198.12°
- Argument of periapsis: 273.05°
- Mean anomaly: 84.772°
- Last perihelion: 31 January 2024
- Next perihelion: 3 October 2031
- T_{Jupiter}: 2.449
- Earth MOID: 0.140 AU
- Jupiter MOID: 0.829 AU

Physical characteristics
- Mean radius: 0.69 km (0.43 mi)
- Comet total magnitude (M1): 18.1

207P/NEAT is a Jupiter-family comet with an orbital period of 7.62 years. It is one of many comets discovered by the Near Earth Asteroid Tracking (NEAT) survey.

== Observational history ==
The comet upon discovery appeared diffuse, with the coma having a diameter of 8 to 15 arcseconds and its apparent magnitude was estimated to be 19.9 by NEAT and 17.1 – 17.3 by other observers. After further observations it was determined that it is a short period comet, with an orbital period of about 7.5–7.9 years which has a rough similarity with that of the lost comet Biela according to Shuichi Nakano. It was also identified as a faint asteroidal object that was detected by Arianna Gleason of Spacewatch on 7 October 2000, but it wasn't followed-up.

The comet was recovered on 15 October 2008 by K. Kadota using a CCD camera mounted on a 25-cm reflector telescope. The comet had a coma diameter of 0.5-0.6 arcminutes and a central condensation with no tail. The apparent magnitude was estimated to be 16.4. It was not observed in its 2016 apparition, but during the 2024 apparition the comet approached Earth at a distance of 0.2198 AU (32.88 million km) on 5 March, and brightened to an apparent magnitude of around 14.

The comet received its official numerical designation (207P) alongside 206P/Barnard–Boattini on December 2008.

== Orbit ==
The comet lies near to a 3:2 inner orbital resonance with Jupiter and could have been a quasi-Hilda comet. The comet also experiences large periodic oscillations in perihelion distance and inclination, ranging from 0.94 AU and 10 degrees of inclination to 3.8 AU and 50 degrees of inclination through the Kozai mechanism the last 10,000 years.

On 6 February 2045, the comet will approach Earth at a distance of 0.1566 AU (23.43 million km).

== Physical characteristics ==
The radius of the nucleus of the comet is estimated to be 0.69 km (0.43 mi).

== Notes ==
Numbered comets
Previous; 206P/Barnard–Boattini	207P/NEAT	Next; 208P/McMillan
