= Graham E. Bell =

American astronomer

Minor planets discovered: 56
see § List of discovered minor planets

Graham E. Bell is an American amateur astronomer and prolific discoverer of minor planets.

Along with amateur astronomer Gary Hug, he operates the U.S. Farpoint Observatory in Eskridge, Kansas.

He is credited by the Minor Planet Center with the discovery of 56 numbered minor planets between 1998 and 2000. He also co-discovered 178P/Hug-Bell, a periodic comet.

== List of discovered minor planets ==
18055 Fernhildebrandt	11 October 1999	list^{[A]}
19619 Bethbell	16 August 1999	list
19630 Janebell	2 September 1999	list
20673 Janelle	3 November 1999	list
21651 Mission Valley	19 July 1999	list
22791 Twarog	14 June 1999	list
(22821) 1999 RS_{33}	2 September 1999	list^{[A]}
23989 Farpoint	3 September 1999	list^{[A]}
24265 Banthonytwarog	13 December 1999	list^{[A]}
24305 Darrellparnell	26 December 1999	list^{[A]}
24308 Cowenco	29 December 1999	list^{[A]}
25594 Kessler	29 December 1999	list^{[A]}
(25595) 1999 YD_{9}	29 December 1999	list^{[A]}
(26436) 1999 YV_{4}	28 December 1999	list^{[A]}
(38249) 1999 QJ_{2}	24 August 1999	list
(38604) 1999 YJ_{4}	27 December 1999	list^{[A]}
(40331) 1999 MS_{1}	17 June 1999	list^{[A]}
(40437) 1999 RU_{33}	6 September 1999	list^{[A]}
(40438) 1999 RV_{33}	6 September 1999	list^{[A]}
(41057) 1999 VU_{22}	12 November 1999	list^{[A]}

(42925) 1999 TC_{6}	6 October 1999	list^{[A]}
(43031) 1999 VY_{25}	14 November 1999	list^{[A]}
(45178) 1999 XW_{143}	13 December 1999	list^{[A]}
(45253) 1999 YU_{4}	28 December 1999	list^{[A]}
(45255) 1999 YK_{13}	31 December 1999	list^{[A]}
(49300) 1998 VZ_{5}	13 November 1998	list^{[A]}
(49705) 1999 VC_{19}	11 November 1999	list^{[A]}
(49976) 1999 YR_{4}	28 December 1999	list^{[A]}
(49977) 1999 YS_{4}	28 December 1999	list^{[A]}
(59803) 1999 QH_{2}	22 August 1999	list
(59829) 1999 RZ_{32}	7 September 1999	list^{[A]}
(60268) 1999 XU_{38}	6 December 1999	list^{[A]}
(74595) 1999 QP	20 August 1999	list^{[A]}
(75013) 1999 UJ_{4}	29 October 1999	list^{[A]}
(75071) 1999 VB_{19}	11 November 1999	list^{[A]}
(75076) 1999 VE_{22}	12 November 1999	list^{[A]}
(75551) 1999 YL_{4}	27 December 1999	list^{[A]}
(85877) 1999 CD_{8}	13 February 1999	list^{[A]}
(91529) 1999 RL_{193}	13 September 1999	list^{[A]}
(91903) 1999 VA_{19}	10 November 1999	list^{[A]}

(101615) 1999 CD_{9}	14 February 1999	list^{[A]}
(102218) 1999 TA_{6}	5 October 1999	list^{[A]}
(102219) 1999 TB_{6}	6 October 1999	list^{[A]}
(102625) 1999 VX_{27}	15 November 1999	list^{[A]}
(121072) 1999 DP_{3}	17 February 1999	list^{[A]}
(121184) 1999 NH	5 July 1999	list^{[A]}
(121764) 1999 YH_{13}	31 December 1999	list^{[A]}
(137812) 1999 YU_{14}	31 December 1999	list^{[A]}
(148186) 2000 BG	16 January 2000	list^{[A]}
(181886) 1999 RP_{32}	9 September 1999	list^{[A]}
(185753) 1999 RM_{193}	13 September 1999	list^{[A]}
(192591) 1999 CE_{8}	13 February 1999	list^{[A]}
(216935) 1999 RJ_{43}	13 September 1999	list^{[A]}
(231776) 1999 XM_{127}	10 December 1999	list^{[A]}
(326317) 1999 VN_{23}	13 November 1999	list^{[A]}
(350344) 2012 UQ_{105}	6 November 1999	list^{[A]}
Co-discovery made with:^{A} G. Hug
