= Barnard Catalogue =

Astronomical catalogue

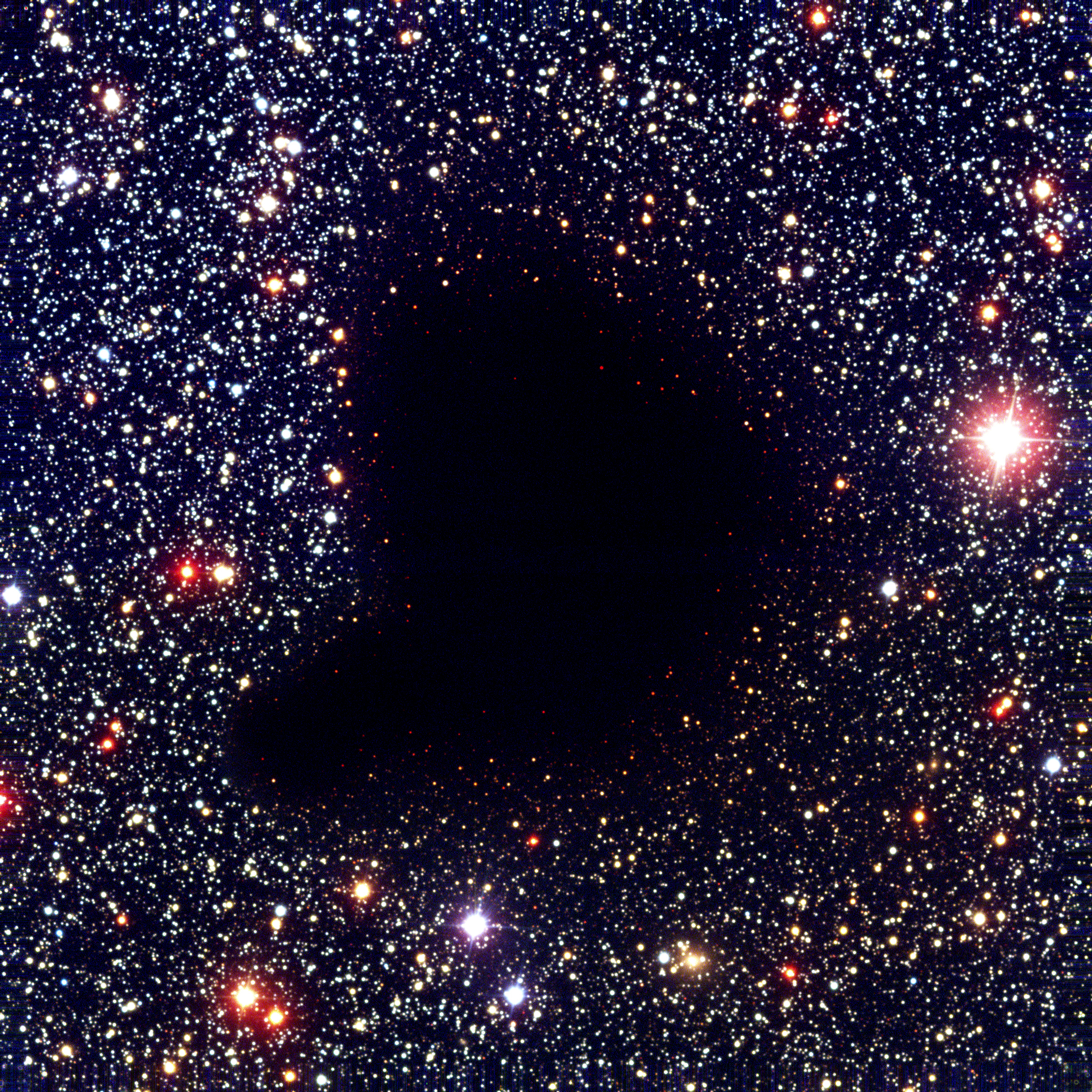
- Barnard 68, one of the objects listed in the catalogue
- Target: Dark nebulae
- Named after: Edward Emerson Barnard
- Published: 1919

The Barnard Catalogue is an astronomical catalogue of dark nebulae.

A version of the Barnard Catalogue, containing 349 objects, can be accessed via VizieR.

== History ==
In 1919, the American astronomer Edward Emerson Barnard compiled a list of dark nebulae known as the Barnard Catalogue of Dark Markings in the Sky, or the Barnard Catalogue for short. The nebulae listed by Barnard have become known as Barnard objects. A 1919 version of the catalogue listed 182 nebulae; the posthumously published 1927 version lists 369.

Barnard's niece and assistant Mary Ross Calvert, also an astronomer and astrographer, took an important part in creating the catalogue.

== See also ==
- List of dark nebulae
- Lynds' Catalogue of Dark Nebulae
