= Mary R. Calvert =

American astronomer (1884–1974)

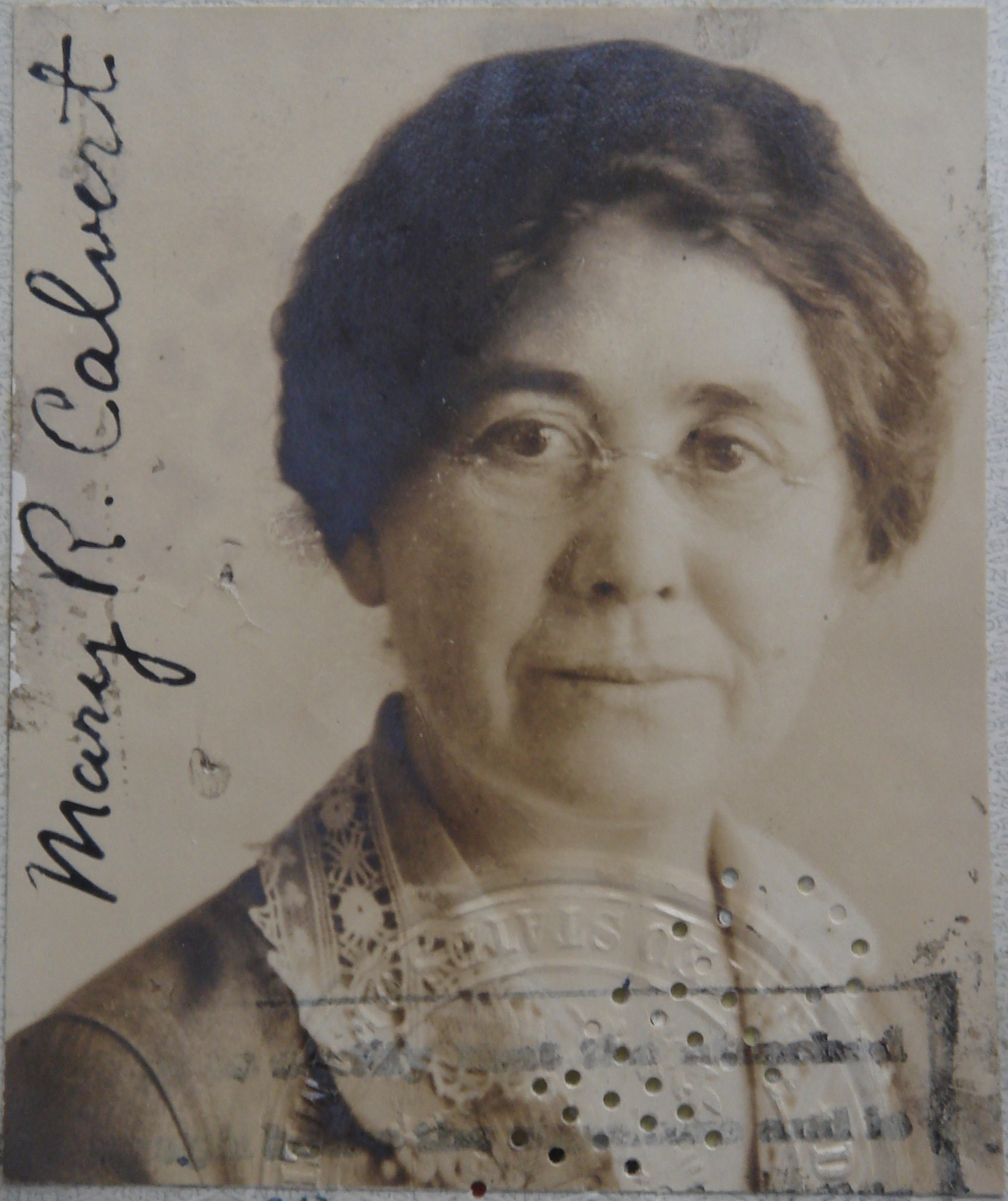
- Calvert's 1927 passport photo
- Born: Mary Ross Calvert; June 20, 1884; Nashville, Tennessee, US
- Died: June 25, 1974 (aged 90); Nashville, Tennessee, US
- Known for: Atlas of the Northern Milky Way; A Photographic Atlas of Selected Regions of the Milky Way
- Relatives: Edward Emerson Barnard (uncle)
- Scientific career
- Fields: Astronomer; astrophotographer
- Institutions: Yerkes Observatory

Mary Ross Calvert (June 20, 1884 – June 25, 1974) was an American astronomical computer and astrophotographer. She started as her uncle Edward Emerson Barnard's assistant and ended publishing his (and their) work that cataloged over 300 dark objects (dark nebulae) — primarily those that extinguish the most starlight reaching the Earth lie between the bulk (inward local sector, central bulge, and other sectors of the Milky Way) thus between the Local Arm (Orion Arm) and the Sagittarius Arm. She went on to publish other photographic works on astronomy.

== Early life ==
Calvert was born in Nashville, Tennessee, on June 20, 1884, to Alice Rosamond (Phillips) and Ebenezer Calvert (1850–1924). She was the eldest of their four daughters. Her father's elder sister Rhoda had married the astronomer Edward Emerson Barnard, and out of respect, her parents had called her sister Alice Barnard Calvert.

Her father and his younger brother Peter Ross Calvert (1855–1931) ran Calvert Bros. Photography Studio above the United Cigar Store at the southeast corner of 4th and Union Streets in Nashville. The studio was founded by J. H. Van Stavoren; Rodney Poole bought it at a chancery court sale in 1871, and the Calvert brothers bought it from Poole in 1896.

== Career ==
In 1905, she started work at Yerkes Observatory, Wisconsin, as assistant and computer for her uncle who was also professor of astronomy at the University of Chicago. She stayed at her uncle's house whilst employed by him. He was known for his discovery of the high proper motion of Barnard's Star.

In 1923, when Barnard died, she became curator of the Yerkes photographic plate collection and a high-level assistant, until her retirement in 1946.

Barnard's work A Photographic Atlas of Selected Regions of the Milky Way was completed after his death in 1923 by Edwin B. Frost, director of the Yerkes Observatory, and Calvert. The work was nominally his although Calvert had done the preliminary work under his supervision, but it was she who did the computations necessary to complete the tables, numbered and sketched in darker objects added annotation to the reference stars. Calvert and Frost decided that it should be published in two volumes. The atlas contained 349 dark objects although later editions covered 352 as three had been omitted by mistake. There were several more dark objects that were on the plates but that were not catalogued possibly due to Barnard's death, as both Calvert and Barnard had been aware of them.

Only 700 copies were printed in 1927, making the original edition a collector's item. The Astronomy Compendium calls it a "seminal work".

In 1934 she and Frank Elmore Ross published a photographic study, Atlas of the Northern Milky Way, based on Ross's photographs.

== Later life ==
After she retired from Yerkes in 1946, she received no pension. She returned to Nashville, where she worked in her sister's photographic studio part-time.

She died in Nashville in 1974.

== Publications ==
- Atlas of the Northern Milky Way (with Frank Elmore Ross), University of Chicago Press (1934)

== See also ==
- Great Rift (astronomy) – the main zones from Earth's viewpoint of dust clouds ('dark nebulae') obscuring the prominent vast bulk of the Milky Way in the night sky.
