= 489P/Denning =

Jupiter-family comet

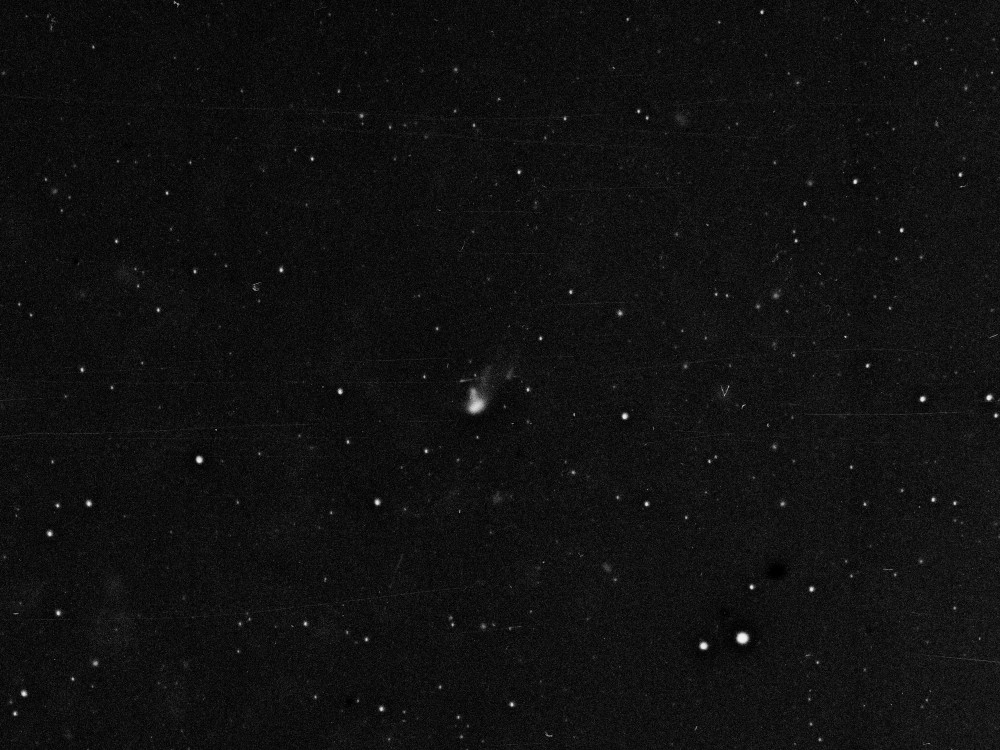
- The comet on 30 March 1894 by Max Wolf

Discovery
- Discovered by: William F. Denning
- Discovery site: Bristol, England
- Discovery date: 26 March 1894

Designations
- MPC designation: D/1894 F1, P/2007 HE_{4}
- Alternative designations: 1894 I, 1894a

Orbital characteristics
- Epoch: 18 August 2002 (JD 2452504.5)
- Observation arc: 113.14 years (Note: Observation arc from the Minor Planet Center database covering dates from 27 March 1894 until 18 May 2007.)
- Number of observations: 302
- Aphelion: 7.312 AU
- Perihelion: 1.575 AU
- Semi-major axis: 4.443 AU
- Eccentricity: 0.6456
- Orbital period: 9.37 years
- Inclination: 4.007°
- Longitude of ascending node: 22.579°
- Argument of periapsis: 107.96°
- Mean anomaly: 180.38°
- Last perihelion: 4 December 2025
- Next perihelion: 27 March 2035
- T_{Jupiter}: 2.579
- Earth MOID: 0.596 AU
- Jupiter MOID: 0.065 AU
- Comet total magnitude (M1): 7.6

489P/Denning is a Jupiter-family comet with an orbital period of 9.4 years. It was discovered by William Frederick Denning on 26 March 1894 but was subsequently lost until 2024, when asteroid 2007 HE_{4} was identified as the same object.

== Observational history ==
William Frederick Denning was searching for comets from Bristol, England, when on 26 March 1894 he found a faint object in Leo Minor. (Note: Reported initial position upon discovery was: α = 148^{h} 45^{m} , δ = 57° 45′) The next few days the magnitude of the comet was reported to be about 11. The comet also featured a tail about 5 arcminutes long. The comet upon discovery had passed both the perihelion and closest approach to Earth and was becoming fainter. In April the comet was observed as very faint and elongated. Few observations were made in May. The comet was last detected on 5 June 1894. It is possible the comet experienced an outburst in 1894, and the subsequent anomalous tail it produced was initially presumed to have indicated that the comet's nucleus was destroyed until its recovery in 2024 revealed it is still intact.

The first orbit was calculated by Lipót Schulhof with positions from 27 to 31 March and indicated a parabolic orbit with perihelion on 13 February 1894. However, by mid April he suspected that the comet deviated from the orbit. The first elliptical orbit he calculated, with positions from 27 March to 25 April, had a perihelion date of 9 February and an orbital period of 6.74 years. Other orbits calculated were 7.94 years by Lewis Boss, 6.79 years by Schulhof, 6.76 years by John Russell Hind, and 7.70 years by Hind.

The comet wasn't recovered and became lost. In 2024 it was noted that Mars-crossing asteroid 2007 HE_{4}, which was discovered by LINEAR on 17 April 2007 with an apparent magnitude of 18.7–19.5, had a comet-like orbit and was ranked by a machine learning model as likely active due to only being observed on one opposition. Maik Meyer found that the asteroid's orbit was a good match with the proposed orbit of comet Denning. Images of the object by the Great Shefford Observatory from 18 and 19 April were re-examined and it appeared slightly elongated, with an aspect ratio of 3:2 when compared with nearby stars, and extending eastwards. Images obtained by the 1.82 m (6.0 ft) telescope of the Dominion Astrophysical Observatory on 19 April 2007 when stacked showed a coma with a diameter of 5".3 and a faint, spike-like tail extending for 8 arcseconds. The apparitions from 1972 to 1997 weren't favorable. The 1963–4 apparition was favorable, however no plates were found.

During the 2025 apparition the comet was predicted to reach 18th magnitude. The comet received its permanent numerical designation (489P) on July 2025.

== Orbit ==
As a Jupiter-family comet, 489P/Denning approaches close to planet Jupiter. A close approach, at a distance of 0.071 AU (10.6 million km) took place in July 1830. During the 1894 apparition the comet had a perihelion distance of 1.15 AU and an orbital period of 7.42 years. An approach to Jupiter on 18 June 1925 at a distance of 0.24 AU raised the orbital period to 8.00 years and perihelion to 1.29 AU and a further approach on 8 November 1986 at a distance of 0.19 AU raised them to 9.31 years and 1.56 AU respectively.

During the 1894 apparition the comet passed 0.27 AU (40 million km) from Earth on 12 February. Other close encounters took place on 25 December 1908, at a distance of 0.62 AU, and on 29 January 1964 at a distance 0.47 AU.

== Notes ==
Numbered comets
Previous; 488P/NEAT–PanSTARRS	489P/Denning	Next; 490P/ATLAS
