= 206P/Barnard–Boattini =

Periodic comet

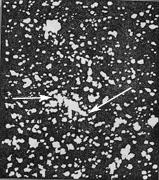
- Discovery photograph of 206P/Barnard–Boattini on 13 October 1892

Discovery
- Discovered by: Edward E. Barnard; Andrea Boattini
- Discovery site: Mount Wilson Observatory
- Discovery date: 13 October 1892; 7 October 2008

Designations
- MPC designation: D/1892 T1, P/2008 T3
- Alternative designations: Barnard 3; 1892 V, 1892e

Orbital characteristics
- Epoch: 25 February 2023 (JD 2460000.5)
- Observation arc: 116 years
- Number of observations: 329
- Aphelion: 5.415 AU
- Perihelion: 1.565 AU
- Semi-major axis: 3.49 AU
- Eccentricity: 0.55155
- Orbital period: 5.5740 years
- Inclination: 33.639°
- Longitude of ascending node: 202.35°
- Argument of periapsis: 189.51°
- Mean anomaly: 109.19°
- Last perihelion: 4 March 2021
- Next perihelion: 27 September 2027
- T_{Jupiter}: 2.613
- Earth MOID: 0.141 AU
- Jupiter MOID: 0.122 AU
- Comet total magnitude (M1): 20.3

206P/Barnard–Boattini was the first comet to be discovered by photographic means. First observed by Edward Emerson Barnard in 1892, it was subsequently lost for 116 years until it was rediscovered by Andrea Boattini in 2008.

== Observational history ==
=== Discovery and loss ===
The American astronomer Edward Emerson Barnard spotted the comet from a photographic plate taken on the night of 13 October 1892. It was not recovered after this apparition, thus the comet became lost and was subsequently designated as D/1892 T1. Ľuboš Neslušan suggests that 14P/Wolf and this comet are siblings which stem from a common parent comet, however an earlier study by Donald K. Yeomans in 1975 concluded that there is no evidence that these two comets were related to each other.

=== Recovery and later observations ===
This comet was rediscovered on 7 October 2008 by Andrea Boattini in the course of the Mt. Lemmon Survey. It was initially credited to Boattini before it was identified as Comet Barnard 3. The comet, now known as Barnard–Boattini, passed about 0.1904 AU (28.48 million km; 17.70 million mi) from Earth on 21 October 2008.

206P/Barnard–Boattini was not seen since January 2009, as both apparitions of 2014 and 2021 place it too close to the Sun from Earth's perspective, and was not expected to be brighter than apparent magnitude 20 and 23, respectively.

== Orbit ==
The comet has made 20 revolutions since 1892 and passed within 0.3–0.4 AU of Jupiter in 1922, 1934 and 2005. The comet passed 0.1303 AU (19.49 million km; 12.11 million mi) from Jupiter on 9 July 2017. It will next come to perihelion in September 2027.

The comet has a minimum orbit intersection distance (MOID) of 0.018 AU (2.7 million km; 1.7 million mi) with Earth. In 1991, Ľubor Kresák noted that C/1618 V1, also known as 1618 III, is a possible prediscovery apparition of Comet Barnard 3. (Note: A 2026 study published by Maik Meyer and Gary W. Kronk later determined that C/1618 V1 is most likely a Kreutz sungrazer comet rather than a previous apparition of 206P/Barnard–Boattini.) However a definite link couldn't be made as the comet previously only had a very short observation arc of 55 days, as it wouldn't be rediscovered until 2008.

== Notes ==
Numbered comets
Previous; 205P/Giacobini	206P/Barnard–Boattini	Next; 207P/NEAT
