= Adolf Berberich =

German astronomer (1861–1920)

- Born: Adolf Joseph Berberich; 16 November 1861; Überlingen, Grand Duchy of Baden
- Died: 27 April 1920 (aged 58); Berlin, Germany
- Education: University of Strasbourg
- Known for: Calculation of orbits
- Awards: Valz Prize (1893)
- Scientific career
- Fields: Theoretical astronomy
- Workplaces: Astronomical Calculation Institute

Adolf Joseph Berberich (16 November 1861 – 27 April 1920) was a German astronomer best known for his work on calculating the orbits of minor planets and double stars. The minor planet 776 Berbericia was named in his honour.

== Early life ==
Adolf Berberich was born on 16 November 1861 in Überlingen, Baden, to Katharina Hirt and Michael, a postman in Rastatt. From 1871 to 1880 he attended a gymnasium in Rastatt and then went on to study astronomy at the University of Strasbourg until 1884, during which his family reportedly encountered serious financial difficulties. During his time there, he found himself unsatisfied by the insufficient funding for astronomy, which he blamed partly on Friedrich Winnecke and Wilhelm Schur, who headed the astronomy department and directed the Strasbourg observatory. Berberich originally planned to devote himself to the study of observational astronomy, but severe myopia, or near-sightedness, forced him to turn to theoretical astronomy.

== Career ==
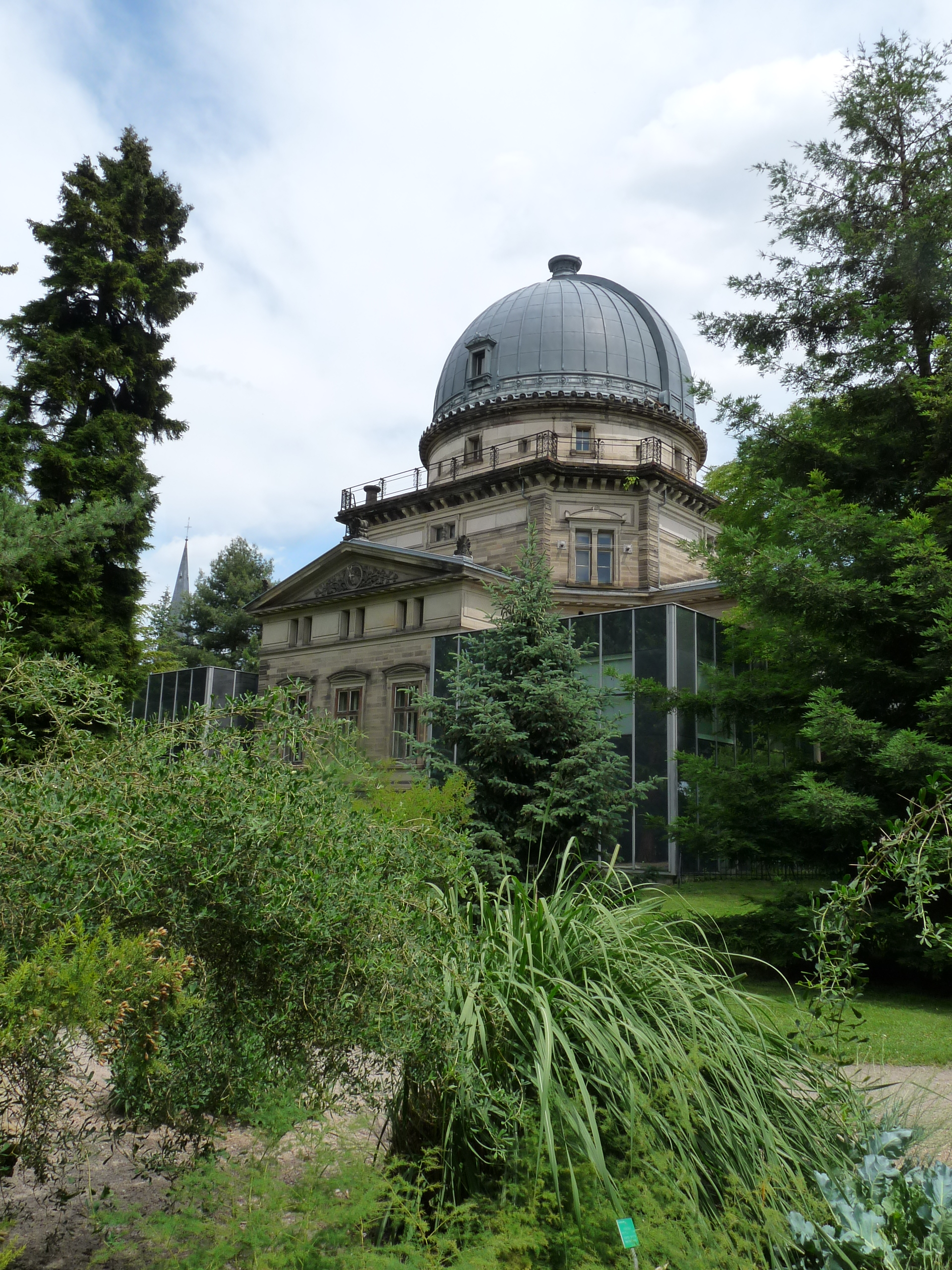
The Strasbourg observatory in 2009

Berberich's proficiency at making calculations was quickly noticed by the astronomy community, with his long-time friend Fritz Cohn noting his "infallible dexterity in arithmetic." In October 1884 he was inducted, as a part-time staff member, into the Astronomical Calculation Institute (ACI), of which Cohn would later become the director. On 1 April 1897, he attained a permanent position at the institute and by December 1903 he was a professor. Initially, Berberich split his time at the institute between assisting in the production of the Berliner Astronomisches Jahrbuch (BAJ) ephemeris and calculating the orbits of comets, with a calculation of his first appearing in Volume 117 of the BAJ. He went on to spend 35 years working on the BAJ and at one point was its director. He quickly became engrossed in the study of minor planets and devoted as much of his office hours as he could to it, as well as frequently continuing his work at home. He published numerous papers detailing methods by which to predict and calculate the movement of astronomical objects and was instrumental in devising the basic principles by which to predict meteor showers. As the number of minor planets grew rapidly, the ACI began to discuss prioritising other less daunting research, but Berberich persuaded the institute to continue their work. His influence within the ACI expanded until, eventually, he oversaw or managed many of the institute's projects.

From 1883 – 1905 he edited the astrophysics section of the Fortschritte der Physik journal published by the German Physical Society. Following the unexpected death of Walter Wislicenus in 1905, Berberich continued to edit and publish the Astronomischer Jahresbericht journal with the help of the ACI. Even with the growing workload, he continued to calculate orbits, albeit at a slower rate. When Fritz Cohn became the director of the ACI in 1909 he found Berberich to be "overworked on the fringes of his forces" and gave him a holiday, which he spent catching up on research into the minor planets.

Berberich enjoyed great recognition and respect both among his local colleagues and internationally, with the French Academy of Sciences awarding him the Valz Prize in 1893 and the Faculty of Philosophy at the University of Wrocław making him an honorary doctorate in 1911. His close friend and colleague Max Wolf said the following of Berberich and another close friend and colleague, Johann Palisa:

Dem Planeten 776 möchte ich den Namen Berbericia, dem Planeten 914 den Namen Palisana beilegen, um so für die beiden Astronomen Adolf Berberich und Johann Palisa, denen die Erforschung der Planetoiden in den letzten Dezennien wohl am meisten verdankte, eine Erinnerung zu stiften. The planet 776 I would like to call Berbericia, the planet 914 the name Palisana, thus creating a remembrance for both the astronomers Adolf Berberich and Johann Palisa, to whom planetoid research of the last decades owes most.

In the final half of his last year, Berberich fell extremely ill and could no longer make the considerable journey to the institute. Nevertheless, he continued to work from home and sent valuable calculations up until the final weeks of his life, during which he took an extended vacation. On the night of 23 April 1920, Berberich suffered a stroke. He failed to recover and died in the morning hours of 27 April in Berlin. Fritz Cohn described the numbers of attendance at his funeral procession as "countless."

== Personal life ==
Berberich was a generally reserved character. He spent most of his time alone and only married in 1916. His two closest friends were observational astronomers Max Wolf, who named a minor planet in Berberich's honour, and Johann Palisa, for whom Wolf also named a minor planet.

Unbeknownst to most of his colleagues and friends until after his death, Berberich was a devout Catholic and was active in the Tempelhof Catholic community, especially as a benefactor and adviser to the poor.

== Honours ==
=== Awards ===
- Valz Prize in 1893 for his calculations of the orbits of double stars, comets, and planets;

=== Namesakes ===
- 776 Berbericia, named by close friend and colleague Max Wolf;

== See also ==
- Max Wolf, close friend of Berberich.
- Johann Palisa, close friend of Berberich.
- 418 Alemannia, asteroid named by Berberich.
- 54P/de Vico–Swift–NEAT, periodic comet which was correctly identified by Berberich after it was lost.
