= William Frederick Denning =

British astronomer

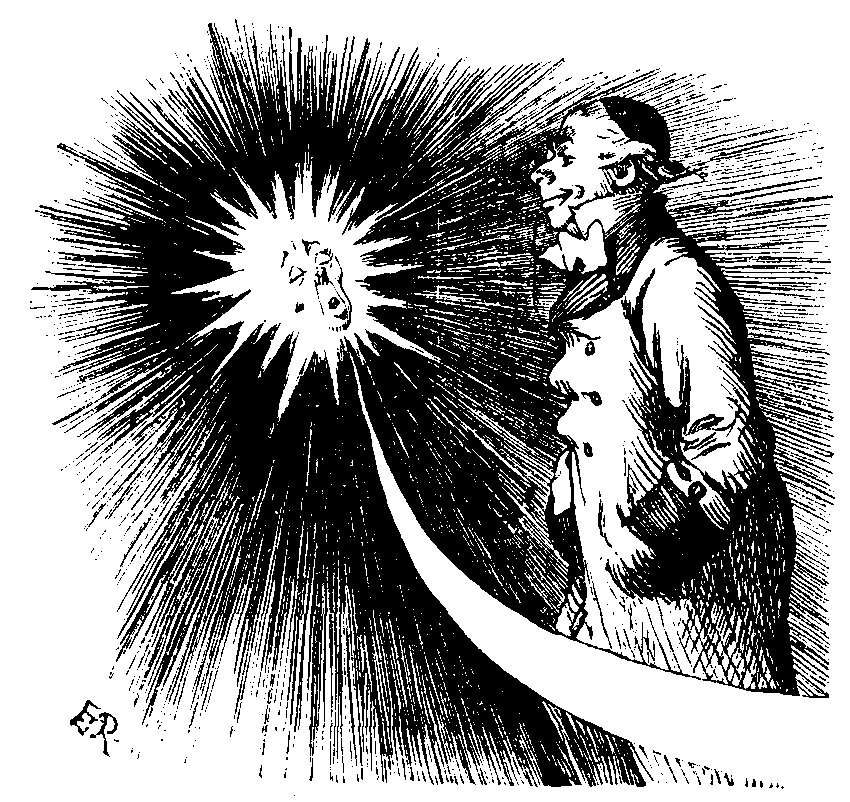
- William Denning celebrated in Punch magazine Vol. 102, 9 April 1892, on the occasion of The Times newspaper commenting on Denning's discovery of a small faint comet on Friday 18 March 1892 at Bishopston, Bristol
- Born: 25 November 1848
- Died: 9 June 1931 (aged 82); Bristol, England
- Occupation: Accountant

William Frederick Denning (25 November 1848 – 9 June 1931) was a British amateur astronomer who achieved considerable success without formal scientific training. He is known for his catalogues of meteor radiants, observations of Jupiter's red spot, and for the discovery of five comets. Outside astronomy, as a young man, Denning showed prowess at cricket to the extent W G Grace invited him to play for Gloucestershire. However Denning's retiring nature made him decline the offer.

== Career ==
Denning devoted a great deal of time to searching for comets, and discovered five of them, including the periodic comets 72P/Denning–Fujikawa and 489P/Denning. The latter was the last comet discovered on British soil until the discoveries of George Alcock, and its recovery was announced by the Minor Planet Center with MPEC 2024-Q14.

Denning also studied meteors and novae, discovering Nova Cygni 1920 (V476 Cyg). From 1869 Denning held the combined post of secretary and treasurer of the short-lived Observing Astronomical Society. Denning was elected to the Royal Astronomical Society on 8 June 1877. He was first elected to the British Astronomical Association on 24 June 1891 and rejoined in 1898, being elected as a member on 16 October of that year. He directed its Comet Section (1891–1893) and Meteor Section (1899–1900). He won the Prix Valz of the French Academy of Sciences for 1895.

During his life, Denning published 1179 articles in prominent scientific journals including Nature, The Observatory, Astronomische Nachrichten, Journal of the Royal Astronomical Society of Canada, Journal des Observateurs, and Monthly Notices of the Royal Astronomical Society.

== Awards and honors ==
- In 1898, Denning won the Gold Medal of the Royal Astronomical Society.
- He also won the Donohoe Comet Medal for his July 23, 1890 discovery of a comet.
- Such was his standing in the astronomical community that following his death a memorial tablet was fixed to his house.
- Crater Denning on the Moon as well as the Martian crater Denning were named after him in 1970 and 1973, respectively.
- Asteroid 71885 Denning, discovered by the Spacewatch program in 2000, was named in his memory. The official naming citation was published by the Minor Planet Center on 4 October 2009 (M.P.C. 67219).
