= List of dark nebulae =

This is a list of dark nebulae (absorption nebulae), also called "dark clouds".

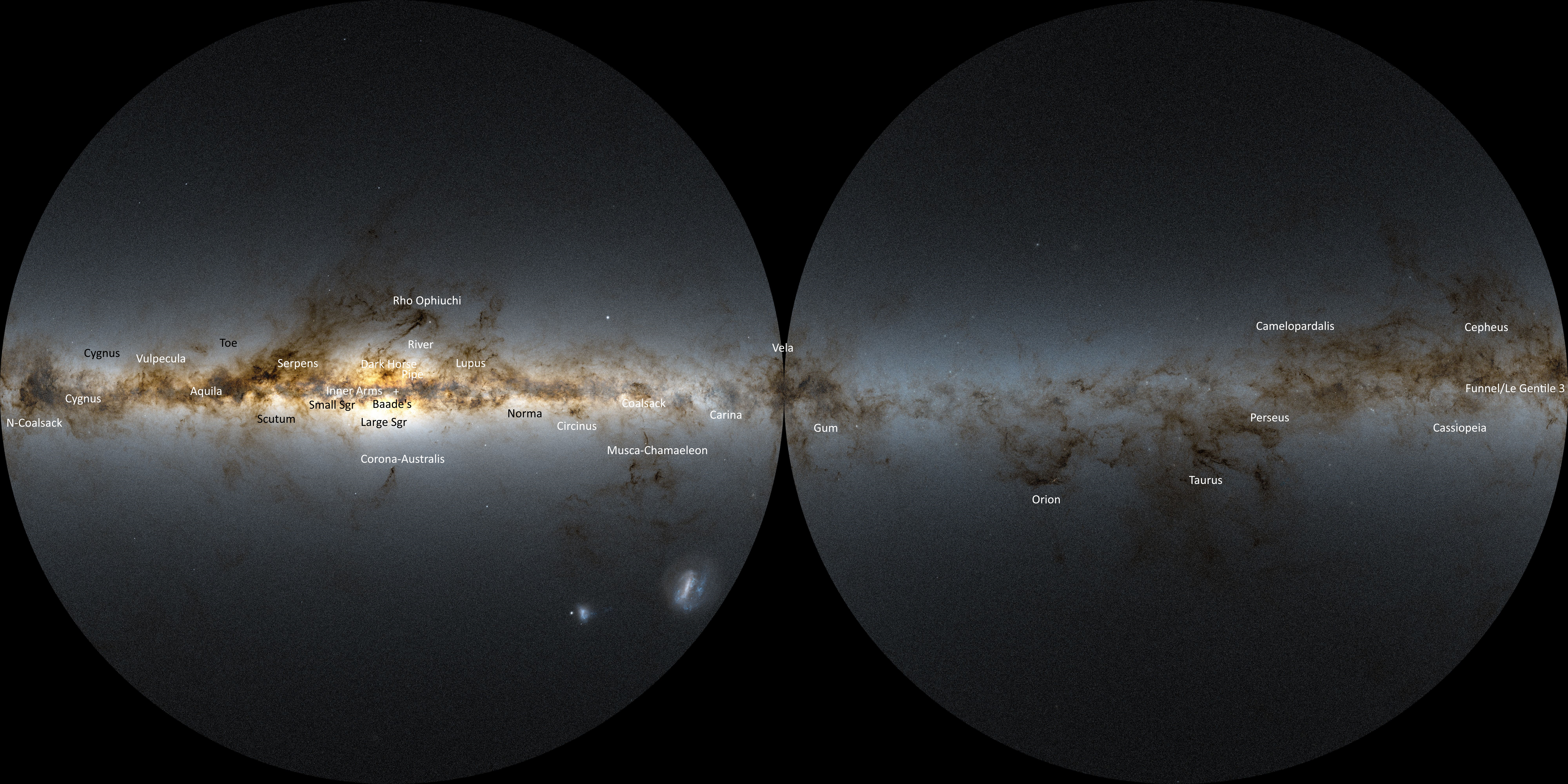
The Milky Way as seen by Gaia, with prominent dark features labeled in white, as well as prominent star clouds labeled in black.

== List ==
- Finger of God Globule
- E Nebula (Barnard 142 and 143)
- Barnard 68, possibly the closest to Earth at about 400 light-years.
- Le Gentil 3
- Sandqvist 111
- Sandqvist 112
- Sandqvist 150
- Sandqvist 155
- Sandqvist 157
- Sandqvist 166
- Sandqvist 169
- Sandqvist 171
- Sandqvist 178
- Bernes 157 (Sandqvist and Lindroos, SL 39-41), another close dark nebula of the Corona Australis Molecular Cloud, which includes NGC 6729
- SL 41
- LDN 43 (Cosmic Bat Nebula)
- LDN 193
- LDN 206
- LDN 208
- LDN 535
- LDN 615
- LDN 621
- LDN 624
- LDN 673
- LDN 688 and LDN 687
- LDN 695
- LDN 749
- LDN 762
- LDN 763 and LDN 764
- LDN 750
- LDN 771
- LDN 780
- LDN 790
- LDN 792
- LDN 793
- LDN 794
- LDN 795
- LDN 796
- LDN 798
- LDN 866
- LDN 898
- LDN 921
- LDN 923 and LDN 924
- LDN 925
- LDN 930
- LDN 935
- LDN 940
- LDN 950
- LDN 954
- LDN 958
- LDN 972
- LDN 1010
- LDN 1020
- LDN 1066
- LDN 1073
- LDN 1083
- LDN 1105
- LDN 1109
- LDN 1139
- LDN 1141
- LDN 1142
- LDN 1150
- LDN 1153, LDN 1143, and LDN 1151 are a part of Barnard 169.
- LDN 1206
- LDN 1207
- LDN 1208
- LDN 1209
- LDN 1214
- LDN 1154
- LDN 1210
- LDN 1211
- LDN 1215
- LDN 1216
- LDN 1235
- LDN 1378
- LDN 1379
- LDN 1380
- LDN 1381
- LDN 1382
- LDN 1383
- LDN 1384
- LDN 1385
- LDN 1386
- LDN 1450, A (Barnard 205), B, C, and E around NGC 1333
- LDN 1468
- LDN 1470
- LDN 1510
- LDN 1530
- LDN 1630
- LDN 1635
- LDN 1641
- DOBASHI 264
- DOBASHI 294
- DOBASHI 298
- DOBASHI 318
- DOBASHI 2251
- DOBASHI 2255
- DOBASHI 2511
- DOBASHI 2666
- DOBASHI 2680
- DOBASHI 2682
- DOBASHI 3210
- DOBASHI 3215
- DOBASHI 3368
- DOBASHI 3381
- DOBASHI 3387
- DOBASHI 3391
- DOBASHI 3413
- DOBASHI 3937
- DOBASHI 4063, DOBASHI 4064, and DOBASHI 4067, which together make up LDN 1399.
- DOBASHI 4076 and DOBASHI 4073, which together make up LDN 1405.
- DOBASHI 4069
- DOBASHI 4202
- DOBASHI 6346
- TGU H442 P3
- TGU H442 P5
- TGU H444 P1
- TGU H445
- TGU H469 P18
- TGU H482 P1
- TGU H488 P2
- TGU H632
- TGU H1085 P3
- TGU H1085 P12
- TGU H1198 P4
- TGU H1210
- TGU H1453
- PGCC G141.48+01.45
- PGCC G160.12-18.31
- PGCC G160.85-35.85
- PGCC G161.29-36.02
- PGCC G161.67-35.92
- PGCC G161.54-38.48
- PGCC G207.57-23.04
- PGCC G207.69-22.77

== Named absorption nebulae ==
See also the references to names from other cultures at dark cloud constellations:

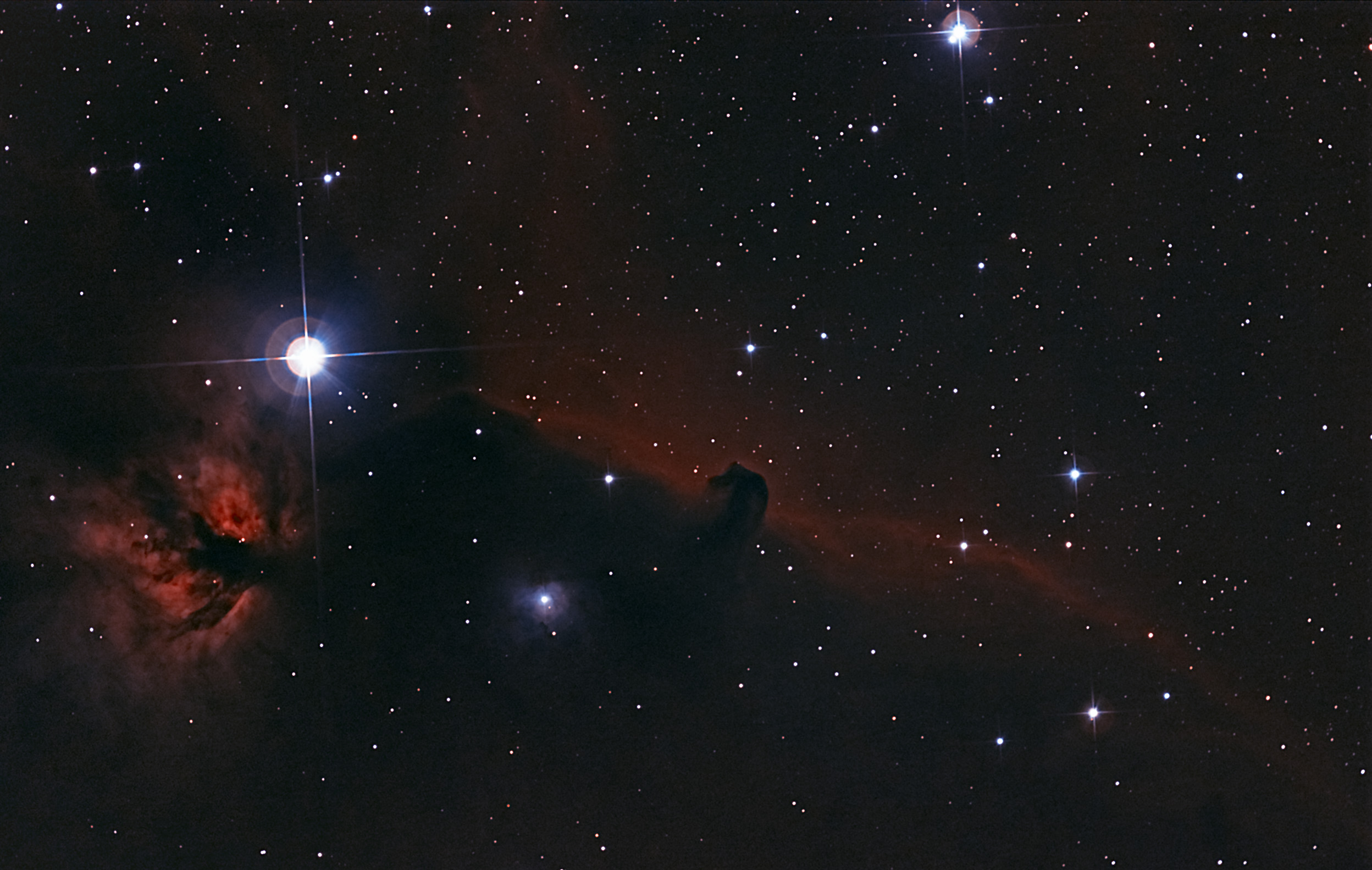
The Horsehead Nebula

- Coalsack Nebula
- Cone Nebula
- Dark Doodad Nebula
- Dark Horse Nebula
- Horsehead Nebula (Barnard 33)
- Pipe Nebula (also see Dark Horse Nebula; includes Barnard 59, 77 and 78)
- Snake Nebula (also see Dark Horse Nebula)
- Keyhole Nebula

== Barnard objects ==
- Barnard 1 - Perseus Molecular Cloud Complex
- Barnard 5
- Barnard 6
- Barnard 7
- Barnard 8
- Barnard 11
- Barnard 12
- Barnard 13
- Barnard 14
- Barnard 15
- Barnard 18
- Barnard 20
- Barnard 21
- Barnard 24
- Barnard 25
- Barnard 28
- Barnard 30
- Barnard 32
- Barnard 33 - Horsehead Nebula
- Barnard 34
- Barnard 35
- Barnard 36
- Barnard 37
- Barnard 40
- Barnard 41
- Barnard 42
- Barnard 43
- Barnard 44
- Barnard 45
- Barnard 51
- Barnard 62
- Barnard 63
- Barnard 64
- Barnard 67 - part of Pipe Nebula
- Barnard 68 - possibly the closest at about 400 light-years
- Barnard 72 - Snake Nebula
- Barnard 75
- Barnard 80
- Barnard 81
- Barnard 84
- Barnard 84
- Barnard 85 - dark part of the Trifid Nebula
- Barnard 86
- Barnard 87 - Parrot's Head Nebula
- Barnard 88 - dark part of the Lagoon Nebula
- Barnard 90
- Barnard 92 - Black Hole Nebula
- Barnard 93
- Barnard 94
- Barnard 95
- Barnard 95
- Barnard 97
- Barnard 100
- Barnard 103
- Barnard 104
- Barnard 107
- Barnard 108
- Barnard 108
- Barnard 109
- Barnard 112
- Barnard 113
- Barnard 116
- Barnard 119
- Barnard 126
- Barnard 128
- Barnard 130
- Barnard 133
- Barnard 136
- Barnard 138
- Barnard 140
- Barnard 141
- Barnard 142 - E Nebula
- Barnard 143 - E Nebula
- Barnard 144
- Barnard 145
- Barnard 146
- Barnard 147
- Barnard 150
- Barnard 152
- Barnard 153
- Barnard 155
- Barnard 157
- Barnard 159
- Barnard 163
- Barnard 164
- Barnard 168
- Barnard 168 - dark lane associated with IC 5146
- Barnard 169
- Barnard 171
- Barnard 175
- Barnard 202
- Barnard 203
- Barnard 210
- Barnard 219
- Barnard 223
- Barnard 225
- Barnard 229
- Barnard 230
- Barnard 234
- Barnard 241
- Barnard 243
- Barnard 244
- Barnard 245
- Barnard 246
- Barnard 250
- Barnard 251
- Barnard 252
- Barnard 254
- Barnard 256
- Barnard 257
- Barnard 259
- Barnard 261
- Barnard 265
- Barnard 266
- Barnard 268
- Barnard 270
- Barnard 272
- Barnard 275
- Barnard 276
- Barnard 277
- Barnard 279
- Barnard 280
- Barnard 281
- Barnard 287
- Barnard 297
- Barnard 303
- Barnard 308
- Barnard 310
- Barnard 312
- Barnard 312
- Barnard 314
- Barnard 320
- Barnard 321
- Barnard 326
- Barnard 327
- Barnard 330
- Barnard 331
- Barnard 333
- Barnard 335
- Barnard 337
- Barnard 338
- Barnard 339
- Barnard 341
- Barnard 343
- Barnard 344
- Barnard 346
- Barnard 346
- Barnard 347
- Barnard 352
- Barnard 354
- Barnard 356
- Barnard 357
- Barnard 361
- Barnard 363
- Barnard 365
- Barnard 366

== Sandqvist Objects ==
In 1976 and 1977 Sandqvist and collaborator Lindroos produced a catalogue of Southern hemisphere dark nebulae. These are now known as the Sandqvist objects. Under IAU Recommendations, they are identified as "Sandqvist NNN", though at times they have also been listed as "SL", "SLDN" and "SDN NNN".

The initial list (1976) detailed 42 objects, (Sandqvist 1 through to Sandqvist 42. In 1977 a further 95 objects were added (Sandqvist 101 through to Sandqvist 195).

== See also ==
- Lists of astronomical objects
- Dark nebula constellation
- Nebula
- Dark nebulae
- Bok globules
- Barnard Catalogue
- Lynds' Catalogue of Dark Nebulae
