= Finger of God Globule =

Bok globule in the Carina Nebula

Molecular cloud
- Bok globule
- dark nebula
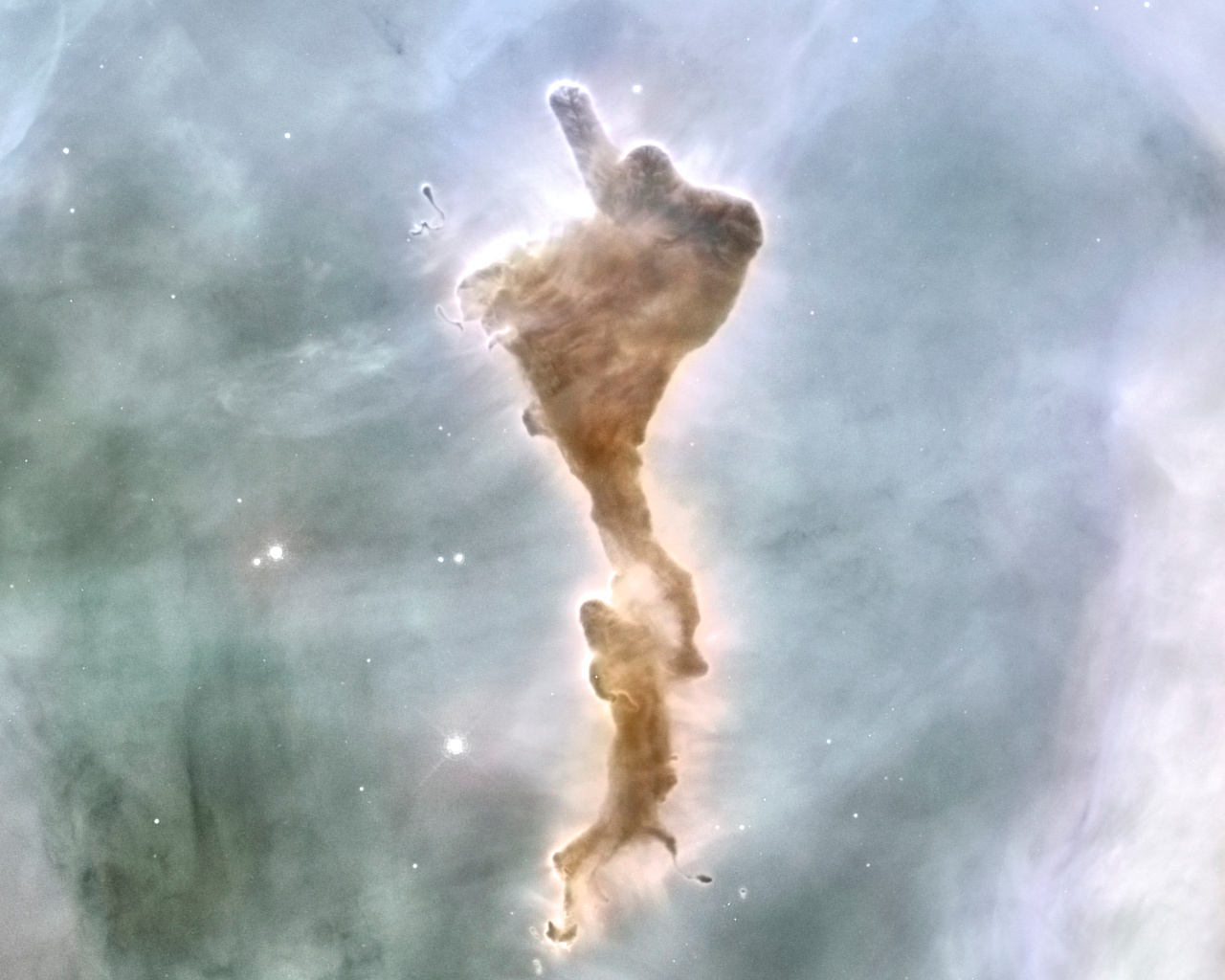
- Image of the "Finger of God".

Observation data: J2000.0 epoch
- Right ascension: 10^{h} 44^{m} 31.2^{s}
- Declination: −59° 39′ 56″
- Constellation: Carina

Physical characteristics
- Radius: ~1 ly
- Designations: "God's Birdie", "Carina Defiant Finger"

The "Finger of God" globule is a Bok globule and dark nebula located around 7,300 light-years away from Earth, within the Carina Nebula. It is ~2 light years across, and got its name due to the finger-like shape located directly on top of the main nebula.

== Etymology ==
The name "Finger of God" came from the structure located on the northern tip of the globule. It is also informally called "God's Birdie" or the "Defiant Finger", named for its resemblance to a hand with its middle finger raised, which is sometimes referred to as "flipping the bird".

== Location ==
The globule is located near the Keyhole Nebula, which itself is located within the Carina Nebula. It is positioned near many other small Bok globules, and is one of the larger objects in its area.

== Description ==
The Finger of God is a relatively small Bok globule located inside of the Carina Nebula. It has an elongated shape, and 2 distinct regions. The first is the "hand" or "wrist", which is the large, bulging portion of the globule located on its northern portions. The second distinct region is the "finger" or "birdie", located at the northern ridge of the hand structure. It points toward its probable sources of ionized radiation, WR 25 and Tr16-244.

The globule is around 2 light-years in diameter, and is composed largely of molecular gasses. It may be illuminated by stars located behind it. It contains around 6 solar masses worth of stellar material.

Although the globule is estimated to disappear in 200,000–1,000,000 years, star formation within it is likely.

== See also ==
- List of dark nebulae
- Barnard 68
- The hand of God
