= B72 =

B72 or B 72 may refer to:

- Bundesstraße 72, a German road
- Sicilian Defense, Dragon Variation, according to the Encyclopaedia of Chess Openings
- Sutton Coldfield in the list of postal districts in the United Kingdom
- Barnard 72, the Snake Nebula

B-72 may refer to:

- ADM-20 Quail, a missile
- B-72 (Michigan county highway)
- Paraloid B-72, an ethyl methacrylate co-polymer used commonly in conservation-restoration
- WS-125, a proposed super long range strategic bomber
