= Snake Nebula =

Dark nebula

Dark nebula
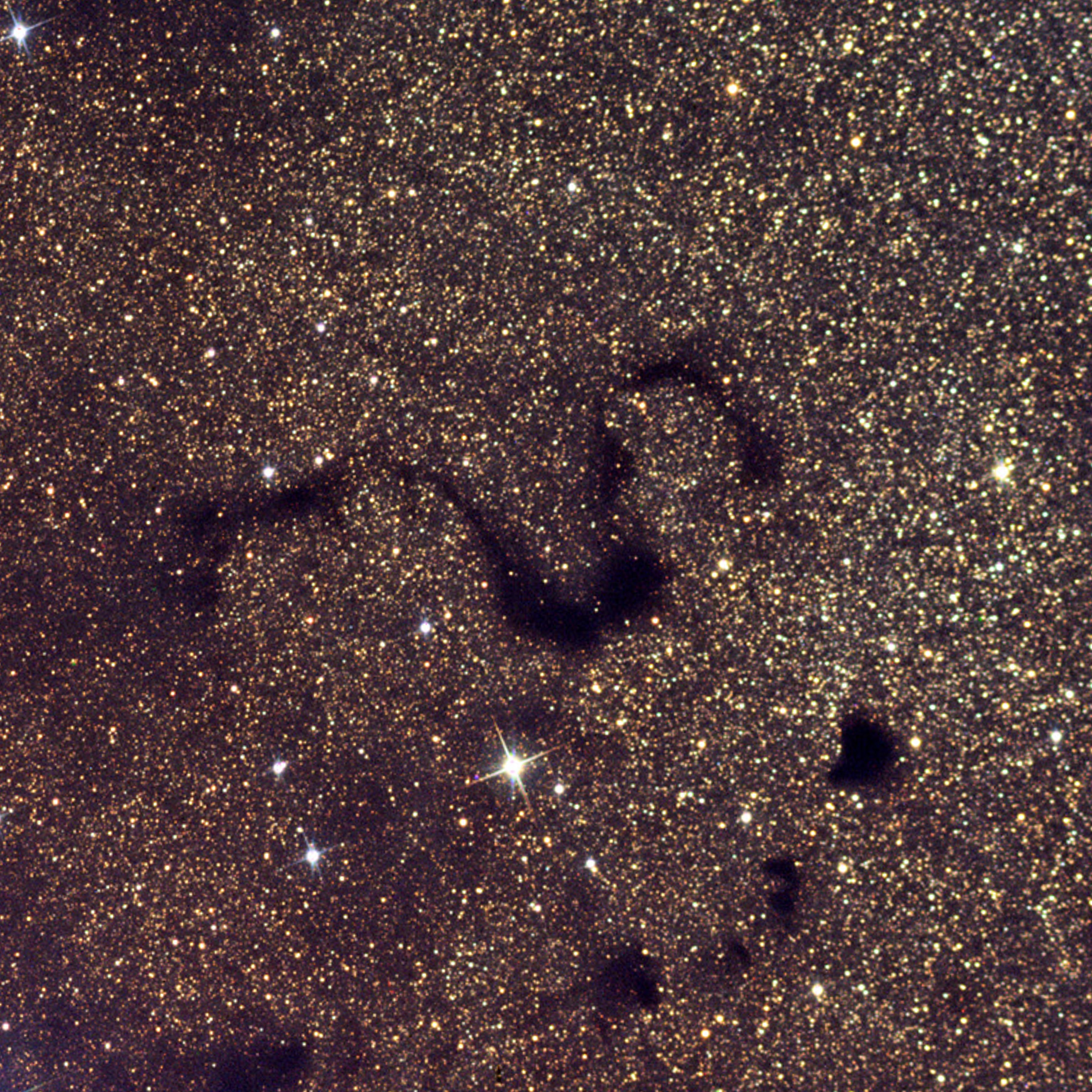

Observation data: J2000.0 epoch
- Right ascension: 17^{h} 23^{m} 30^{s}
- Declination: −23° 38′
- Distance: 650 ly (200 pc)
- Apparent magnitude (V): –
- Apparent dimensions (V): 37 × 17 arcmins
- Constellation: Ophiuchus

Physical characteristics
- Radius: N/A ly
- Absolute magnitude (V): –
- Notable features: –
- Designations: Barnard 72

The Snake Nebula (also known as Barnard 72) is a dark nebula in the constellation Ophiuchus. It is a small but readily apparent SP-shaped dust lane that snakes out in front of the Milky Way star clouds from the north-north-west edge of the bowl of the Pipe Nebula. Its thickness runs between 2′ and 3′ and runs around 6′ in the north-west / south-east orientation. A good view in a 4" to 6" telescope requires clear dark skies.

It is part of the much larger Dark Horse Nebula.

To the right of the Snake Nebula is Barnard 68. Below it are Barnard 69, Barnard 70, and Barnard 74.
