= IC 1590 =

Open cluster in the nebulosity

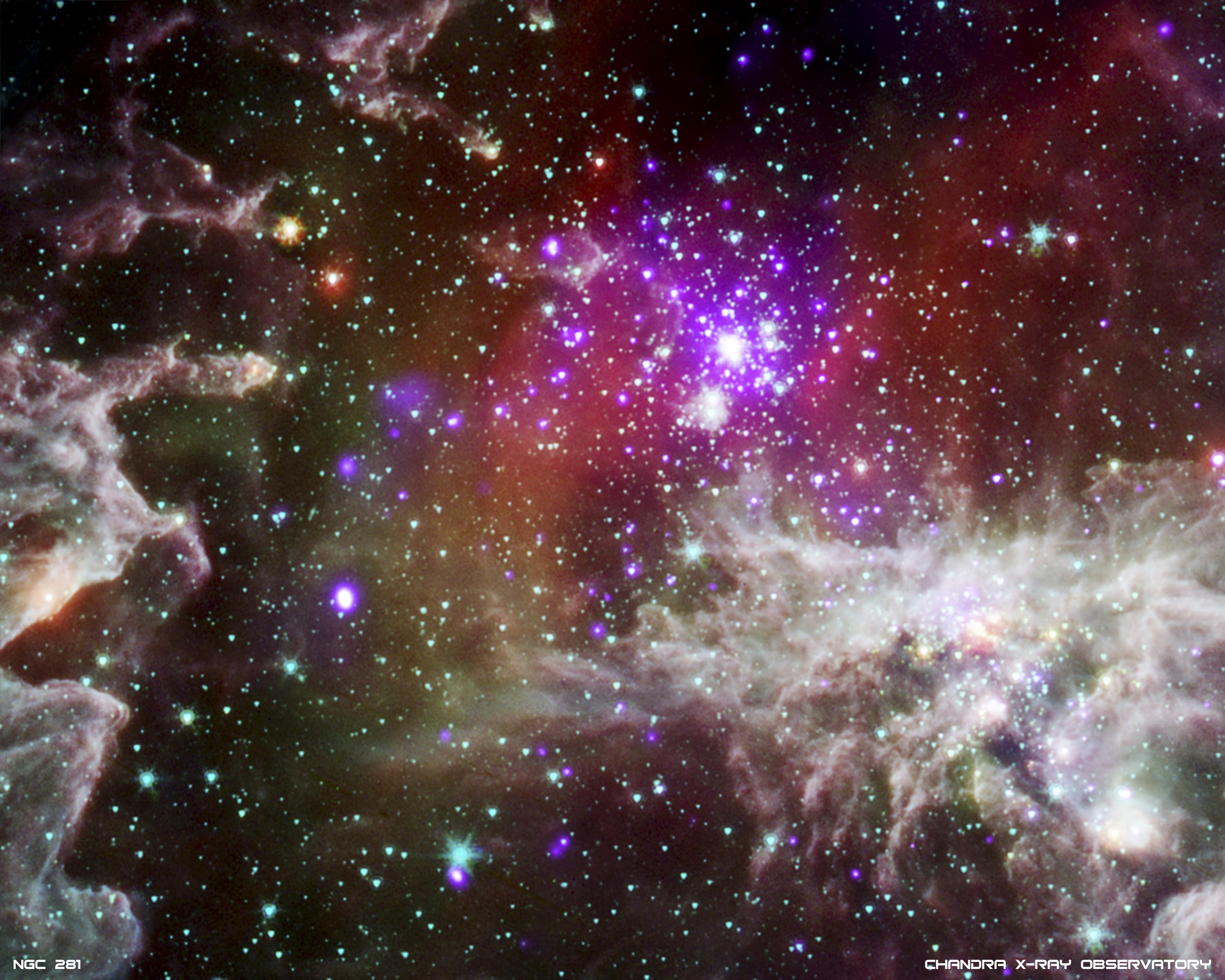
- Credit: X-ray: NASA/CXC/CfA/S.Wolk; IR: NASA/JPL/CfA/S.Wolk

Observation data (J2000 epoch)
- Right ascension: 00^{h} 52^{m} 49.0^{s}
- Declination: +56° 37′ 42″
- Distance: 9600 ly (2900 pc)
- Apparent magnitude (V): 7.4

Physical characteristics
- Other designations: Collinder 8

Associations
- Constellation: Cassiopeia

IC 1590 is an open cluster located in the nebulosity of NGC 281. 279 stars with magnitudes less than or equal to 17 are visible within or near the cluster. The cluster is estimated to be 3.5 million years old, making it relatively young compared to other star systems. Inside the cluster is a multiple-star system that emits light which helps give the dust in NGC 281 its glow.

== Gallery ==
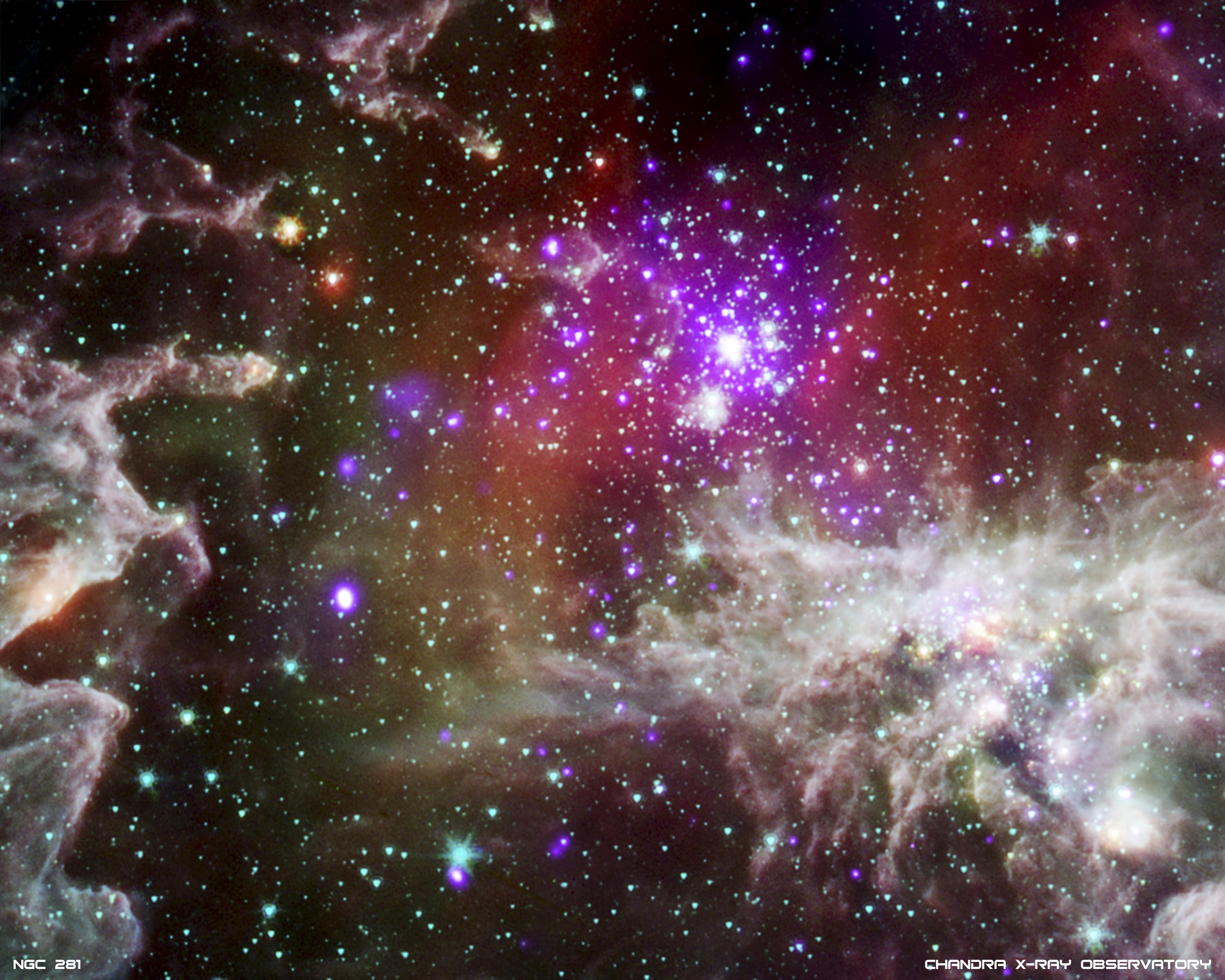
Composite view of IC 1590, using data from Chandra in x-rays (purple) and Spitzer in infrared (red, green, blue).

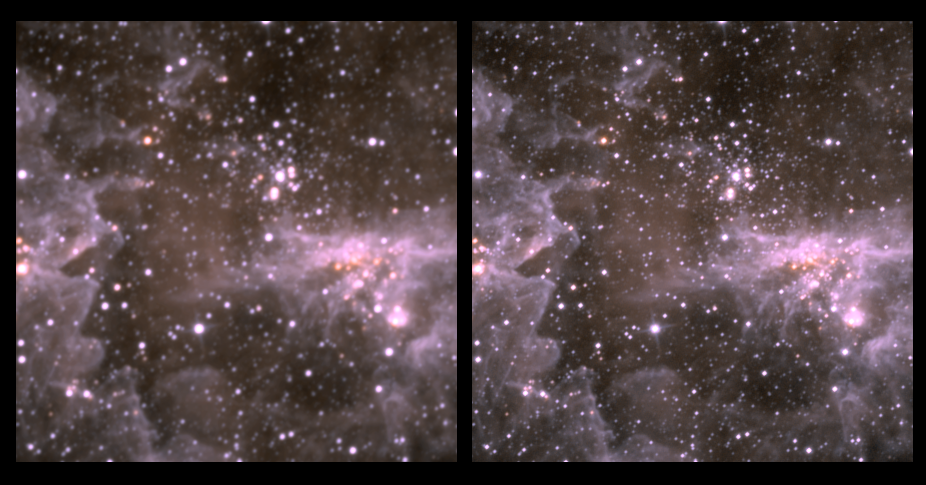
Infrared view of IC 1590 as seen by WISE. The left image uses Allwise Atlas images and the right image use unWISE coadds.

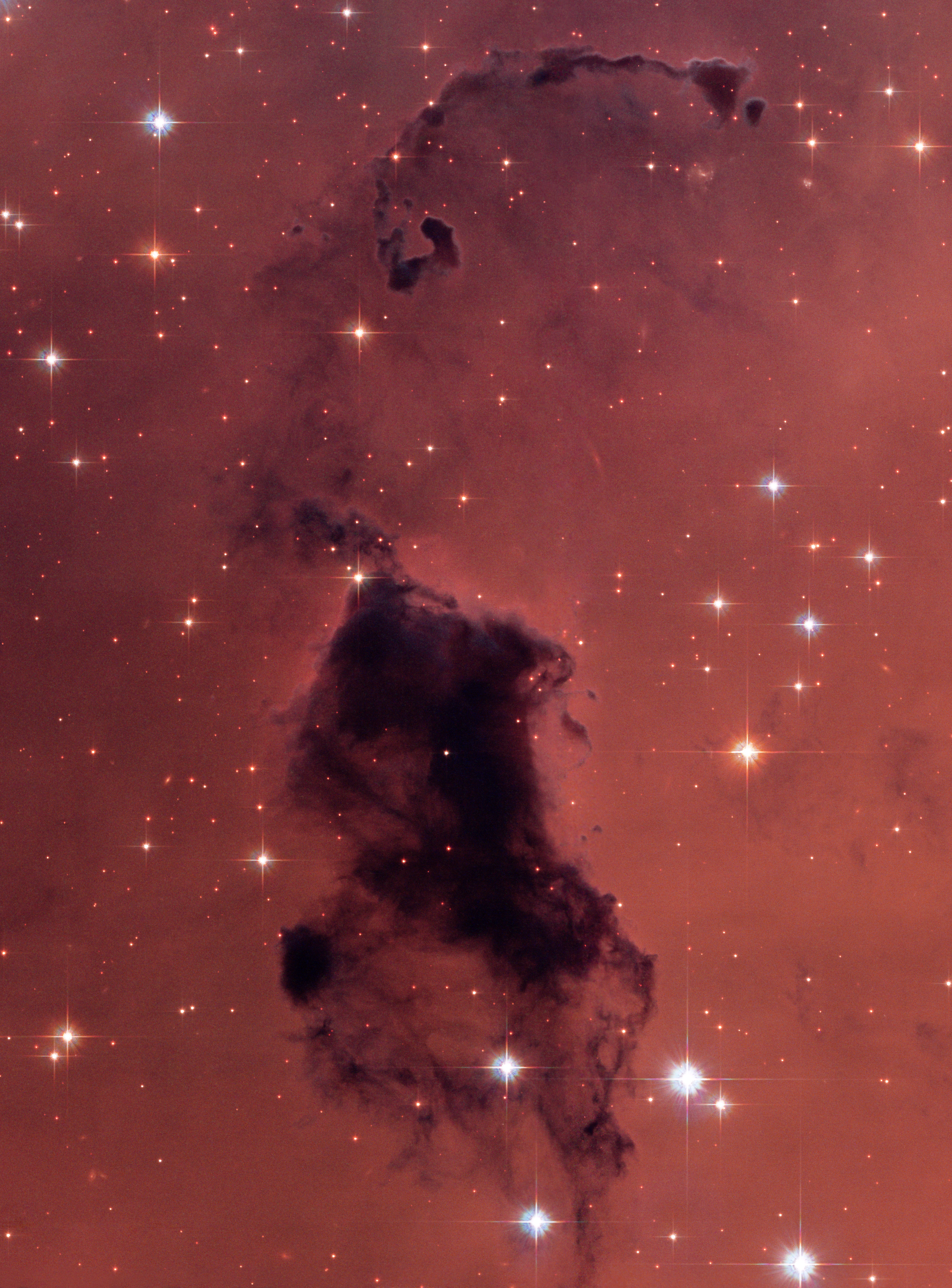
Bok globule in NGC 281 near the star cluster IC 1590. Image by the Hubble Space Telescope.

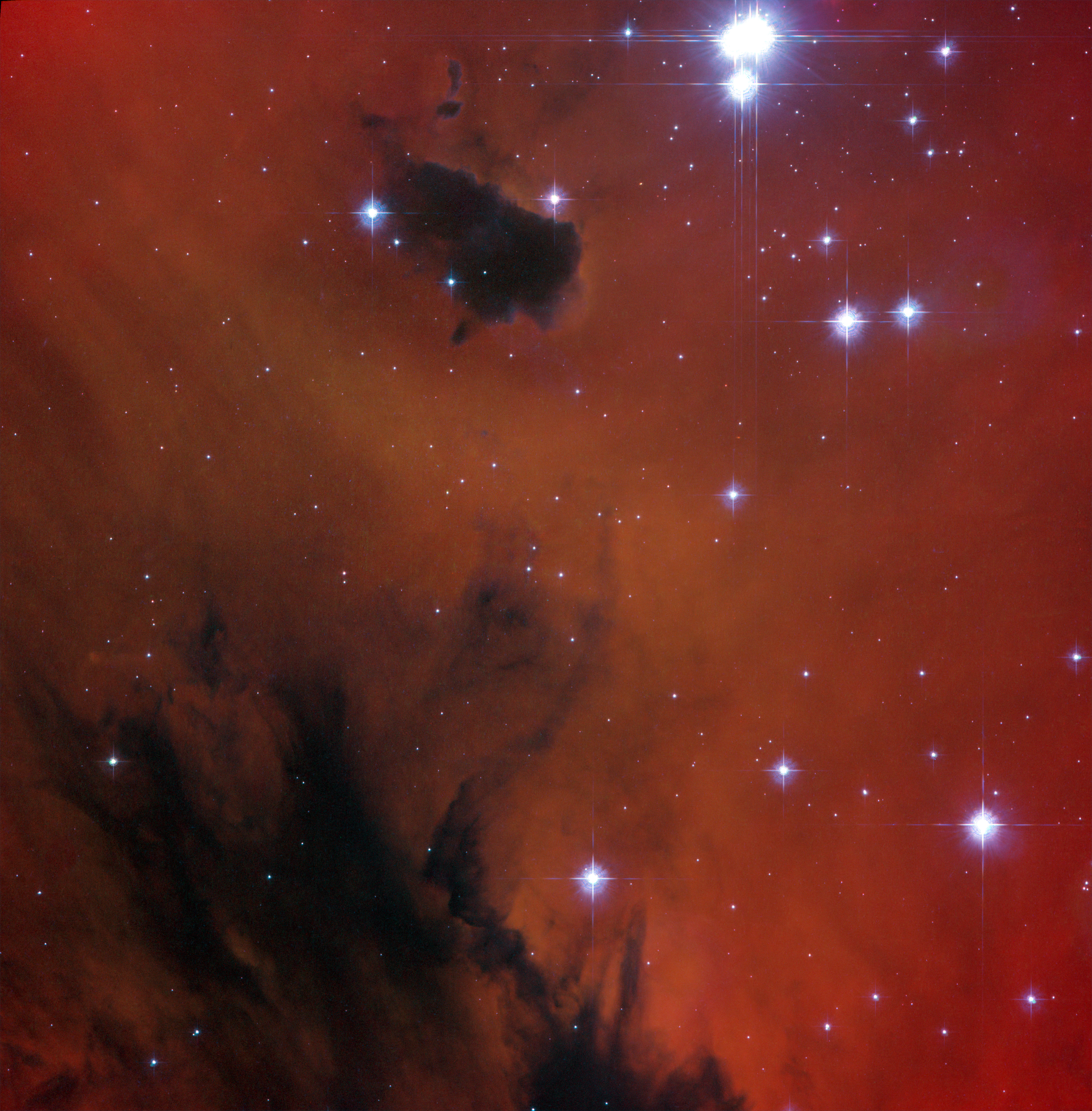
Dark clouds near IC 1590 seen by the Hubble Space Telescope.

== See also ==
- Cassiopeia
- NGC 281
