= SDC 335.579−0.292 =

Planetary nebula in the constellation Norma

Dark nebula
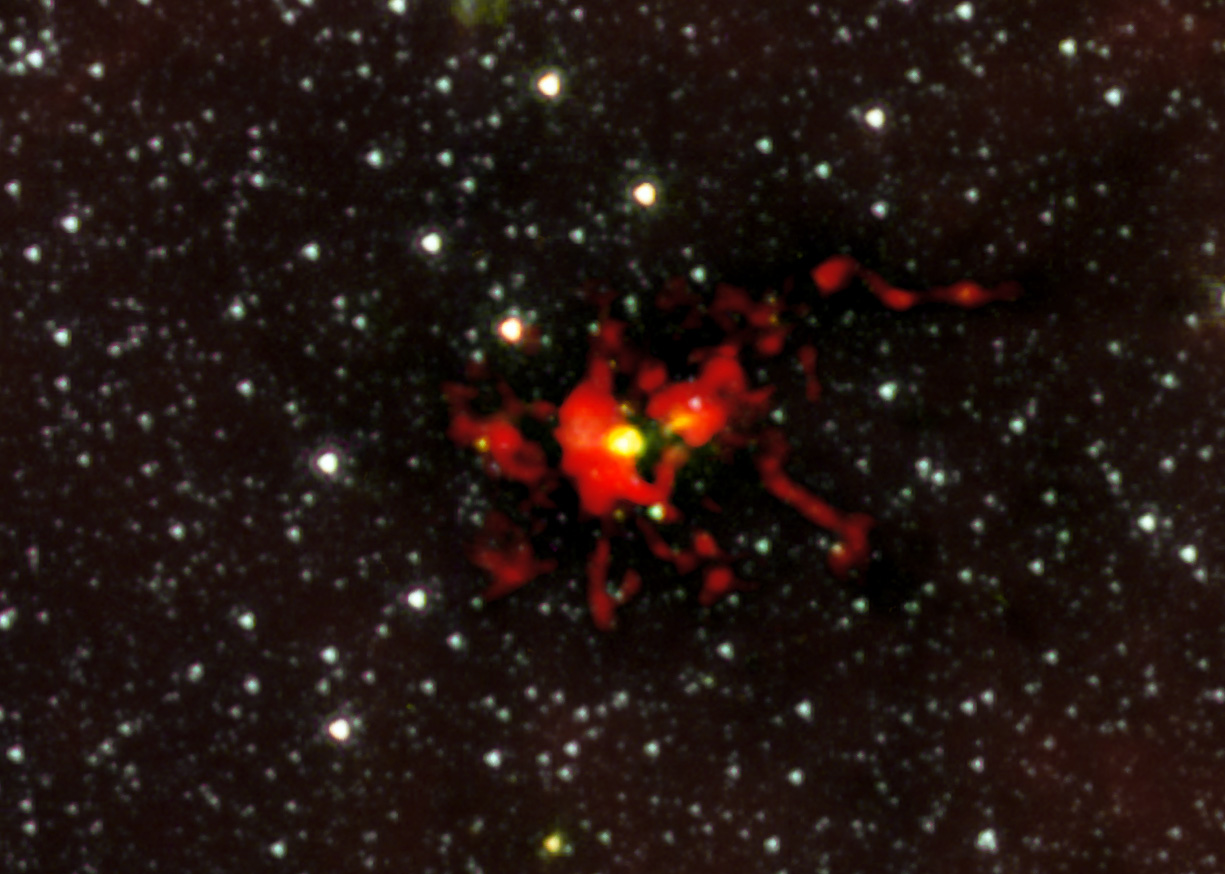
- Infrared image of SDC 335.579−0.292.

Observation data: J2000 epoch
- Right ascension: 16^{h} 30^{m} 58.00^{s}
- Declination: −48° 44′ 16.3″
- Distance: 10600±1100 ly (3250+330 −350 pc)
- Constellation: Norma

Physical characteristics
- Dimensions: 7.8 ly (2.4 pc)

SDC 335.579−0.292 is a dark nebula in the constellation of Norma. It is about 7.8 light-years (2.4 parsecs) in size. Its distance is poorly known, but it is thought to be about 10,000 light-years (3.25 kiloparsecs) away.

SDC 335.579−0.292 is a site where stars are forming. It is one of the most massive such star-forming regions known, with a total mass of over 5,500 solar masses. Inside, there are two massive star-forming cores, one of which has an estimated mass of 545 solar masses. It is thought to be a potential precursor to massive OB associations and massive star clusters, like the famous Trapezium Cluster. It is claimed to live a lifetime of barely a million years.
