= NGC 281 =

Emission nebula in the constellation Cassiopeia

Emission nebula
- H II region
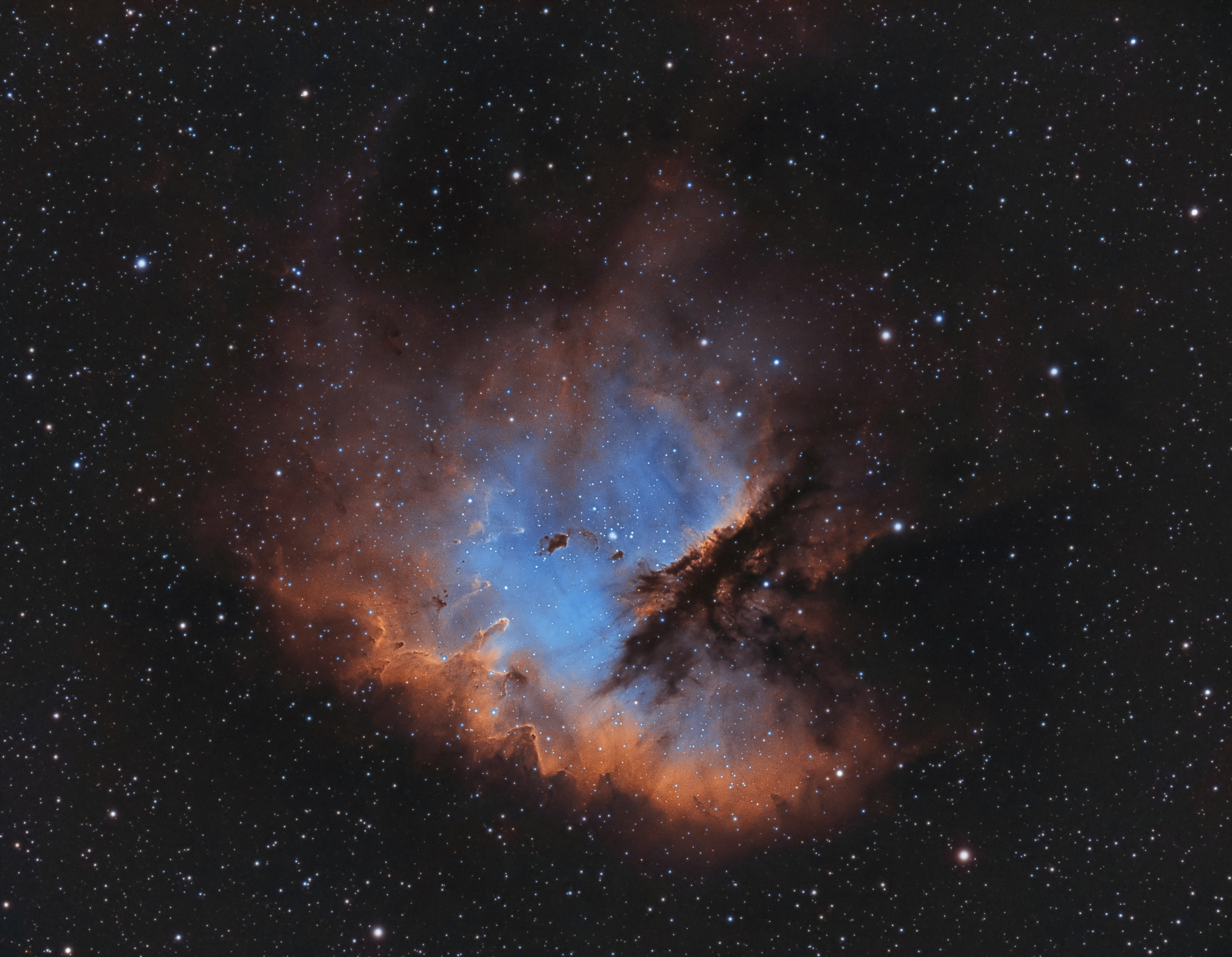

Observation data: J2000.0 epoch
- Right ascension: 00^{h} 52^{m} 59.3^{s}
- Declination: +56° 37′ 19″
- Distance: 9500 ly (2900 pc)
- Apparent magnitude (V): 7.4
- Apparent dimensions (V): 35′ × 30′
- Constellation: Cassiopeia

Physical characteristics
- Radius: 48 ly
- Notable features: open cluster IC 1590, the multiple star B 1, and several Bok globules
- Designations: IC 11, Sh2-184, Sharpless 184, LBN 616, LBN 123.17-06.28, Pacman Nebula

NGC 281, IC 11 or Sh2-184 is a bright emission nebula and part of an H II region in the northern constellation of Cassiopeia and is part of the Milky Way's Perseus Spiral Arm. This 20×30 arcmin sized nebulosity is also associated with open cluster IC 1590, several Bok globules and the multiple star, B 1. It collectively forms Sh2-184, spanning over a larger area of 40 arcmin. A recent distance from radio parallaxes of water masers at 22 GHz made during 2014 is estimated it lies 2.82±0.20 kpc (9200 ly) from us. Colloquially, NGC 281 is also known as the Pacman Nebula for its resemblance to the video game character. Another colloquial name for the nebula is Lafitte's Grand Isle.

Edward Emerson Barnard discovered the nebula in August 1883, describing it as "a large faint nebula, very diffuse". Multiple star 'B 1' or β 1 was later discovered by S. W. Burnham, whose bright component is identified as the highly luminous O6 spectral class star, HD 5005 or HIP 4121. It consists of an 8th-magnitude primary with four companions at distances between 1.4 and 15.7 arcsec. There has been no appreciable change in this quintuple system since the first measures were made in 1875.

The nebula region is visible in amateur telescopes from dark sky locations. In his book Deep Sky Wonders, Walter Scott Houston describes the appearance of the nebula in small telescopes:

There was a faint glow in the immediate vicinity of the multiple star, with an occasional impression of a much larger nebulosity...Its surface brightness was much less than that of M33 in Triangulum or NGC 205, the distant companion of the Andromeda galaxy.

According to Stephen James O'Meara in Deep-Sky Companions: Hidden Treasures (2007),

Here is a complex tapestry of glowing gas forming the backdrop to a tattered curtain of obscuring dust. The entire eastern front of the nebula appears in turmoil. Bulbous masses of dark and light seemingly battle for prominence. It is as if all manner of supernatural shapes and forms are trying to materialize from the bubbling surface of a witch’s brew. Among the tumult, needle-thin protuberances and dense nebulous spires jut from the cloud with three-dimensional clarity; some sport at their tips tiny black dots – the mystifying Bok Globules. These dense knots of dust and gas are the black pools into which we peer helplessly, to dream our dreams of creation, for these are the secret birth sites of new stars. How Barnard’s heart would have fluttered had he lived to see such an image. It would have been like looking into the mind of his Creator.

— p. 28

== Features ==
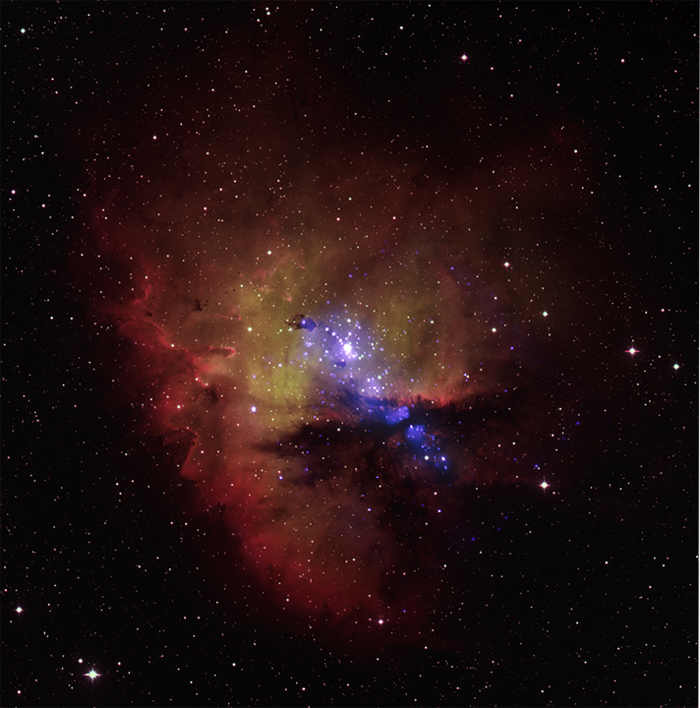
NGC 281 in the optical (red, yellow) and X rays (blue)

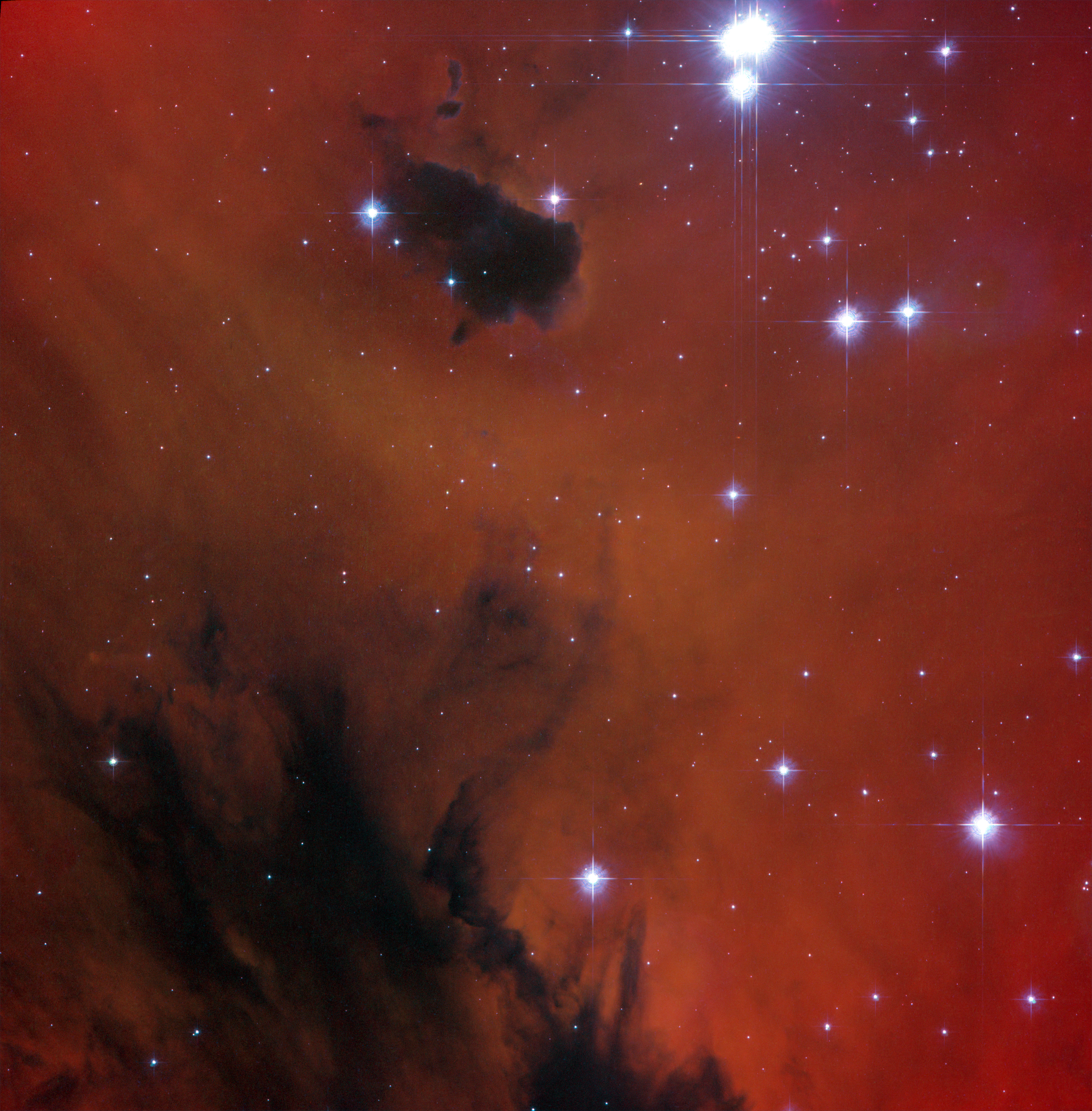
Young open star cluster IC 1590, which is found within NGC 281

NGC 281 (the Pacman Nebula), photographed from Tallinn, Estonia, on 21 September 2026
