= Keyhole Nebula =

Nebular structure inside Carina Nebula

Nebula
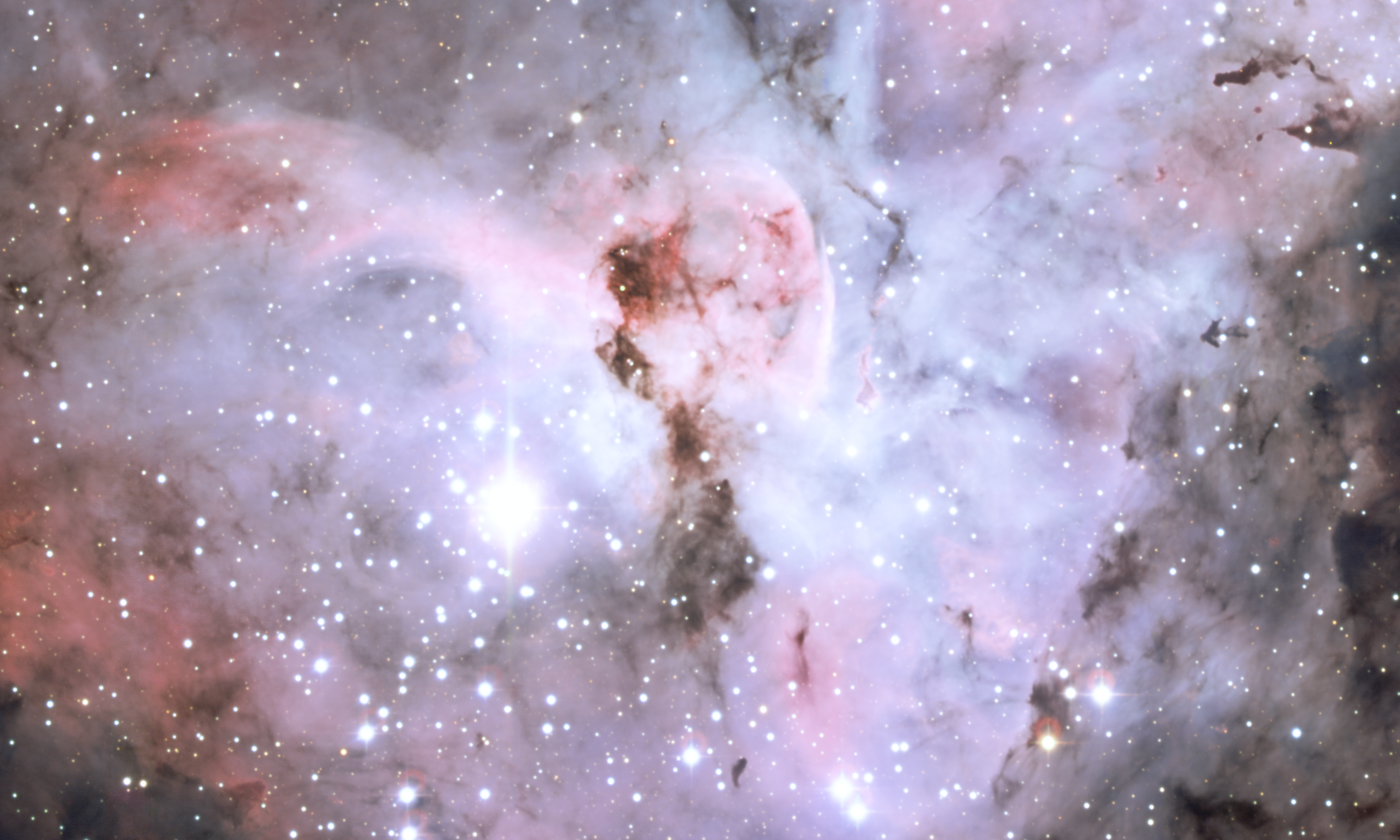
- Keyhole Nebula imaged by European Southern Observatory, the bright star at lower left side is Eta Carinae

Observation data: J2000.0 epoch
- Right ascension: 10^{h} 44^{m} 19.0^{s}
- Declination: −59° 53′ 21.0″
- Distance: ~8,000 ly (~2,500 pc)
- Apparent magnitude (V): +1.0
- Constellation: Carina
- Designations: Keyhole Nebula

Keyhole Nebula is a prominent dark nebulosity and feature within the larger Carina Nebula, a vast emission nebula in the southern constellation of Carina.

== Observation ==
Keyhole Nebula is a small dark cloud of cold molecules and dust within the Carina Nebula, containing bright filaments of hot, fluorescing gas, silhouetted against the much brighter background nebula. The feature was first described in the 1830s by British astronomer John Herschel during observations from the Cape of Good Hope and he referred to it as a "lemniscate-oval vacuity" when first describing it, and subsequently referred to it simply as the "oval vacuity". The term lemniscate continued to be used to describe this portion of the nebula until popular astronomy writer Emma Converse described the shape of the nebula as "resembling a keyhole" in an 1873 Appleton's Journal article. The name Keyhole Nebula then came into common use, sometimes for the Keyhole itself, sometimes to describe the whole of the Carina Nebula (signifying "the nebula that contains the Keyhole").

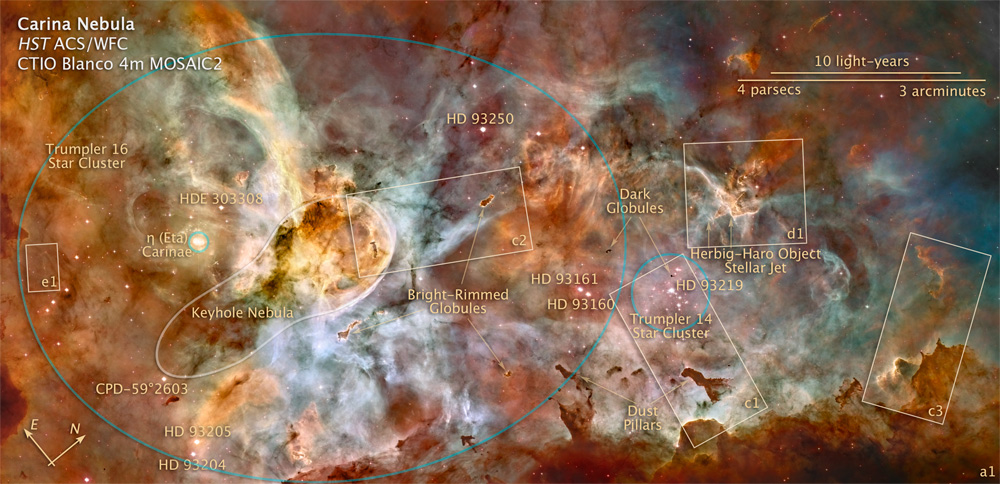
Annotated map of part of the Carina Nebula showing the location of various objects in the nebula. This view combines multiple ground and Hubble observatory images in a 50-light-year wide (15 pc) view.

The diameter of the Keyhole structure is approximately seven light-years (2.1 pc). Its appearance has changed significantly since it was first observed in 19th century, likely due to variations in ionizing radiation and stellar winds from nearby massive stars, particularly the hypergiant binary system Eta Carinae (adjacent to the Keyhole). The Keyhole does not have its own NGC designation. It is sometimes erroneously called NGC 3324, but that catalogue designation refers to a reflection and emission nebula just northwest of the Carina Nebula (or to its embedded star cluster).

== Characteristics ==
The structure includes regions of active star formation with extremely hot, massive O-type stars (roughly 10 times hotter and up to 100 times more massive than the Sun). A small Bok globule within it, photographed in detail by the Hubble Space Telescope, is nicknamed the Finger of God Globule for its finger-like projection, with light visibly radiating from its edges (especially the southern tip).

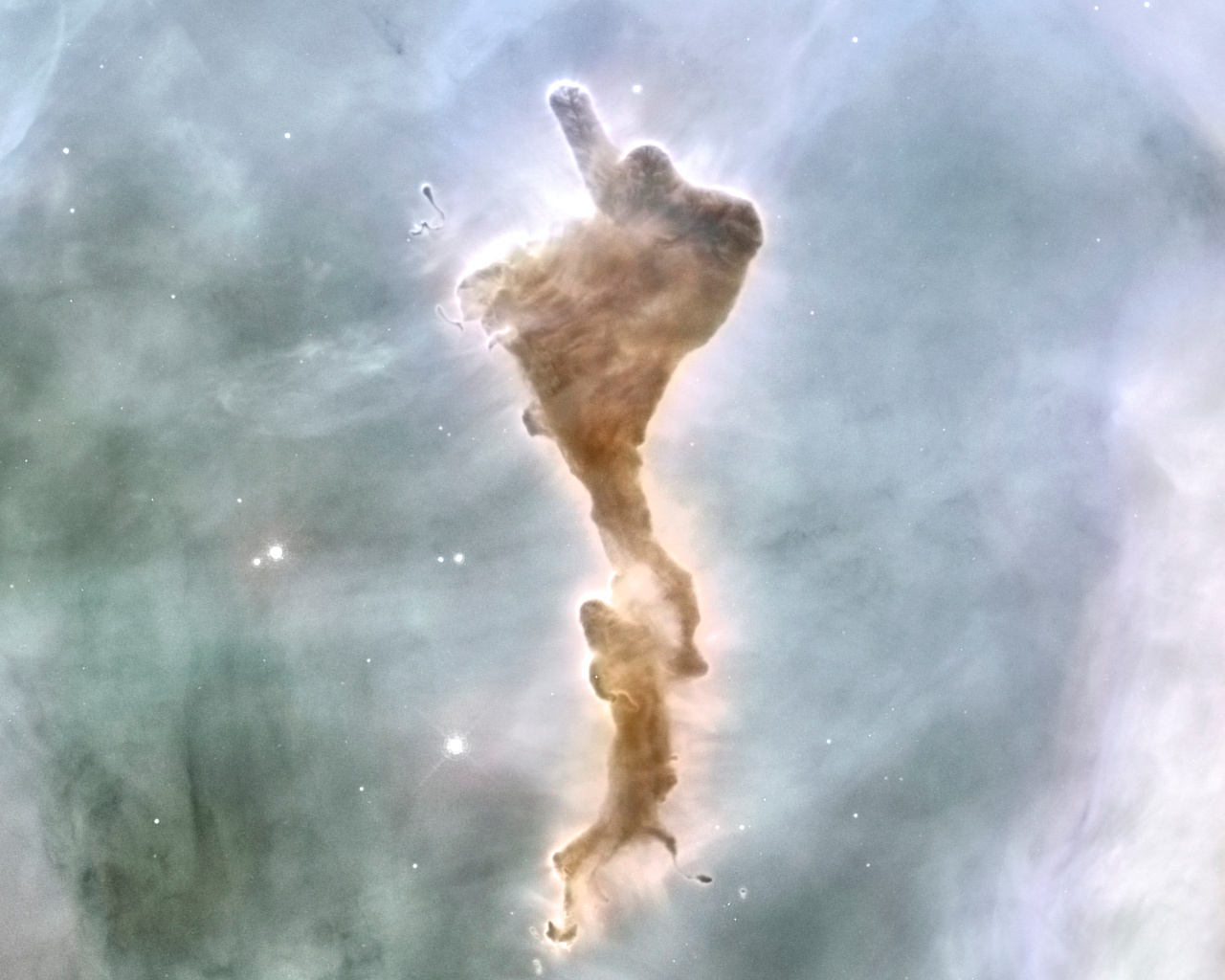
Hubble image of the Defiant Finger

== Gallery ==
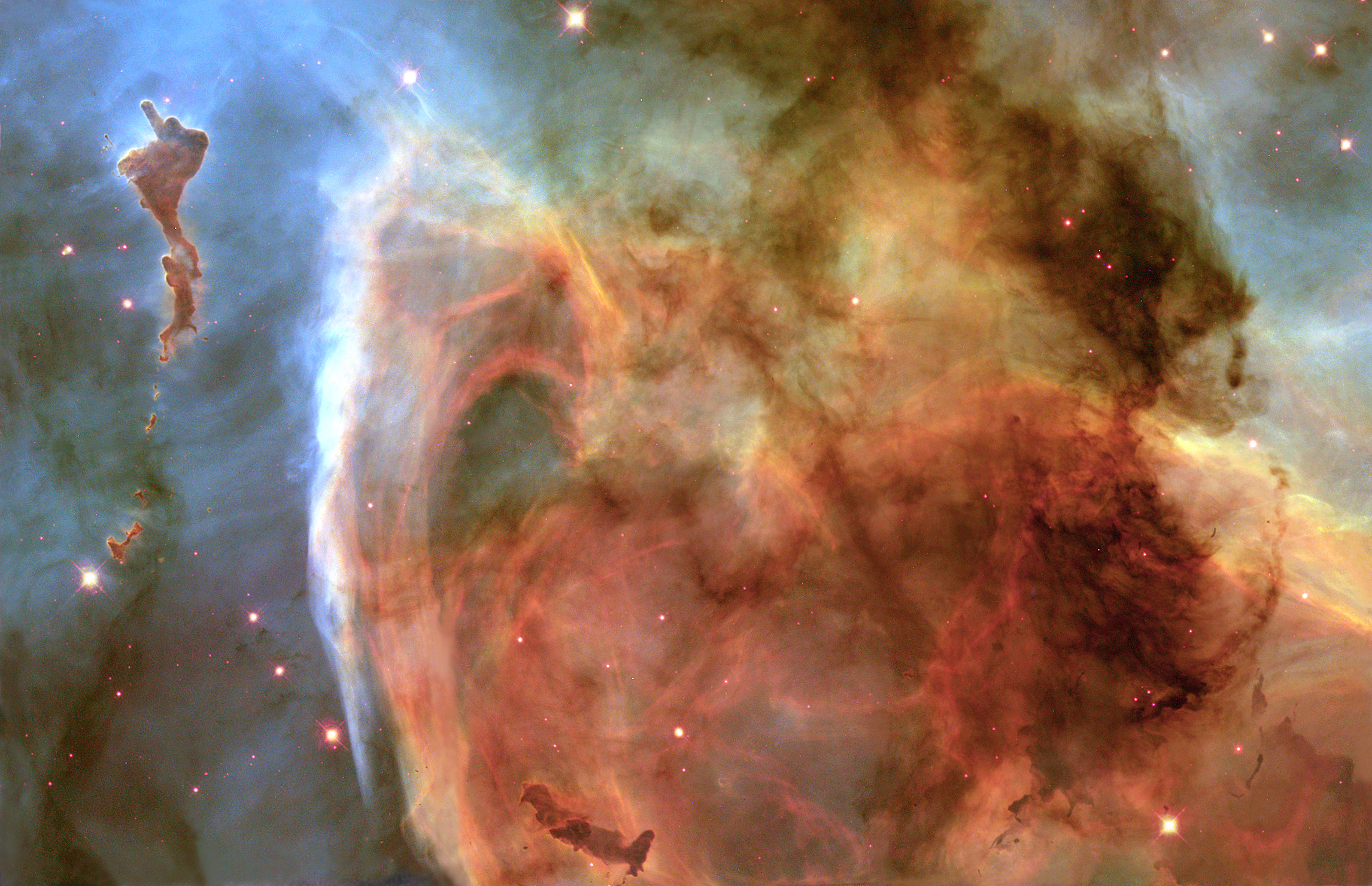
Keyhole Nebula imaged by Hubble Space Telescope

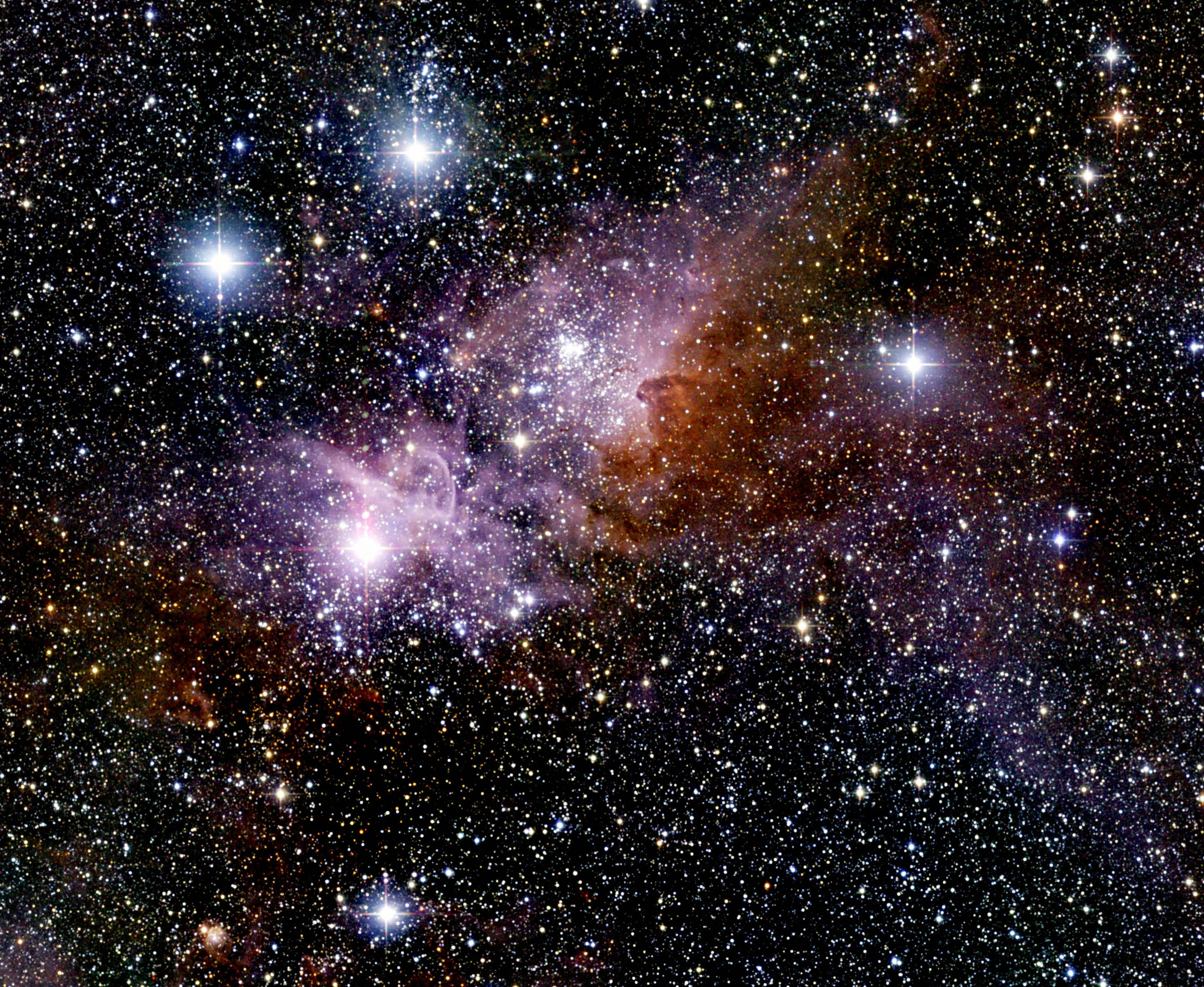
Keyhole Nebula imaged by 2MASS

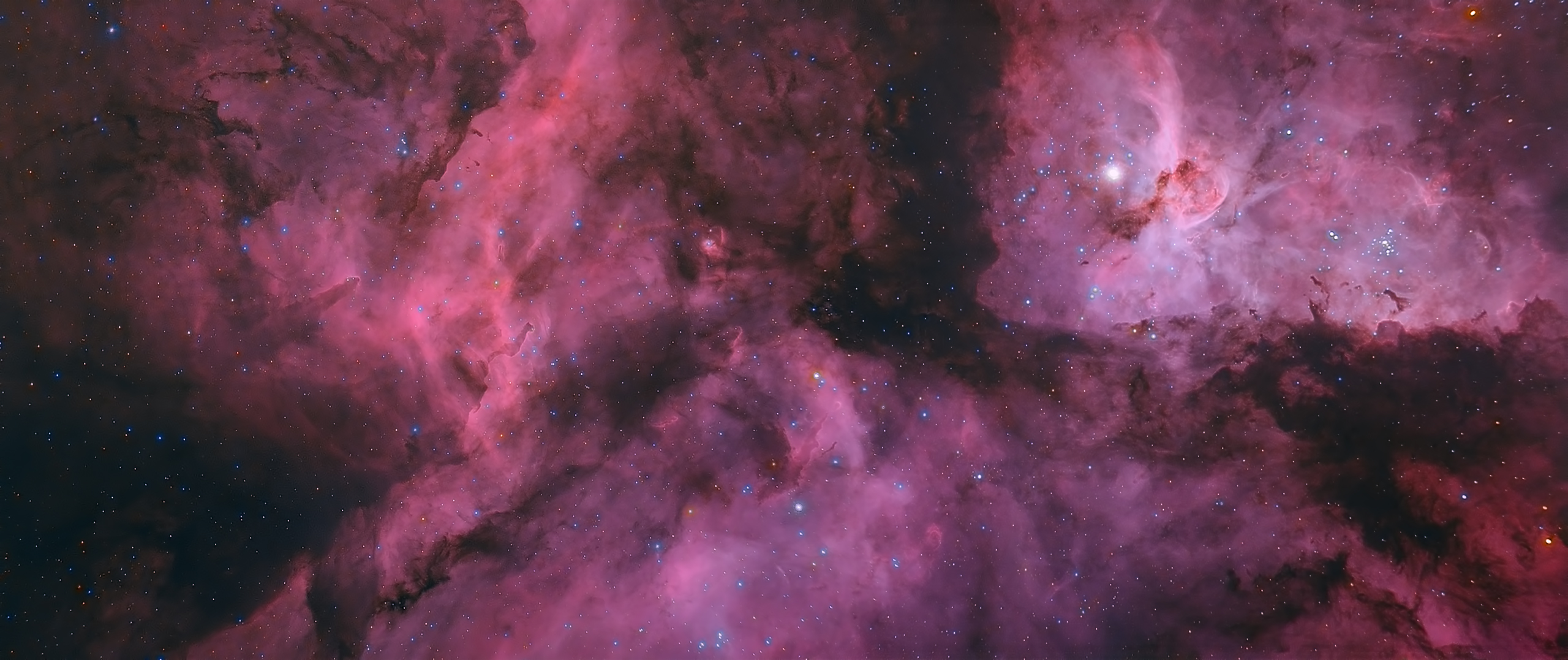
Keyhole Nebula Mosaic
