= Dark Horse (astronomy) =

Dark nebula in Ophiuchus

Dark Horse Nebula
Dark nebula
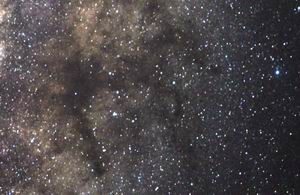
- Dark Horse Nebula

Observation data: J2000.0 epoch
- Right ascension: 17^{h} 21^{m}
- Declination: −21° 07′
- Apparent dimensions (V): 10° × 10°
- Constellation: Ophiuchus
- Designations: Great Dark Horse

The Dark Horse Nebula or Great Dark Horse (sometimes called the Prancing Horse) is a large dark nebula that, from Earth's perspective, obscures part of the upper central bulge of the Milky Way. The Dark Horse lies in the equatorial constellation Ophiuchus (the Serpent Bearer), near its borders with the more famous constellations Scorpius and Sagittarius. It is a large, visible feature of the Milky Way's Great Rift, uniting several individually catalogued dark nebulae, including the Pipe Nebula. It is visible from Earth only on clear moonless nights without light pollution and with low humidity.

== Name and origin ==
This region of dark nebulae is called Dark Horse because it resembles the side silhouette of a horse and appears dark as compared with the background glow of stars and star clouds. It is also known as "Great" because it is one of the largest (in apparent size) groups of dark nebulae in the sky.

The silhouette was first imagined as a horse by former Astronomy editor Richard Berry; combining the Pipe Nebula with several surrounding dark patches, Berry formed a larger horse-shaped figure, which later became known as the "Great Dark Horse Nebula" or "Galactic Dark Horse". After graduating from college, Berry had become interested in astrophotography and took pictures of the Milky Way, where he noticed that the area (then only described as the Pipe Nebula) resembled a horse, and subsequently popularized this visualization. In 1984, it was discussed in the Deep Sky magazine as "Berry's Galactic Dark Horse". Three years later, in the same magazine, Robert Reeves, who sought to popularize names for lesser known deep-sky objects, suggested calling it the "Great Galactic Dark Horse".

Before the 1980s, the name "Dark Horse Nebula" was instead used for the Horsehead Nebula.

== Nearby nebulae ==
The rear of the Great Dark Horse (its rump and hind legs), is also known as the Pipe Nebula, which itself carries the designation B77, B78, and B59. (The 'B' numbers reference entries in the Barnard Catalogue of dark nebulae.) The Snake Nebula (B72) is by comparison a small S-shaped nebula emerging from the west side of the northern part of the bowl of the Pipe (B77).

Barnard 68 is another named dark patch of molecular gas and dust appearing in the Dark Horse Nebula.

== See also ==
- Coalsack Nebula
- Great Rift (astronomy)
