= Barnard 68 =

Dark absorption nebula

Molecular cloud
- Bok globule
- dark nebula
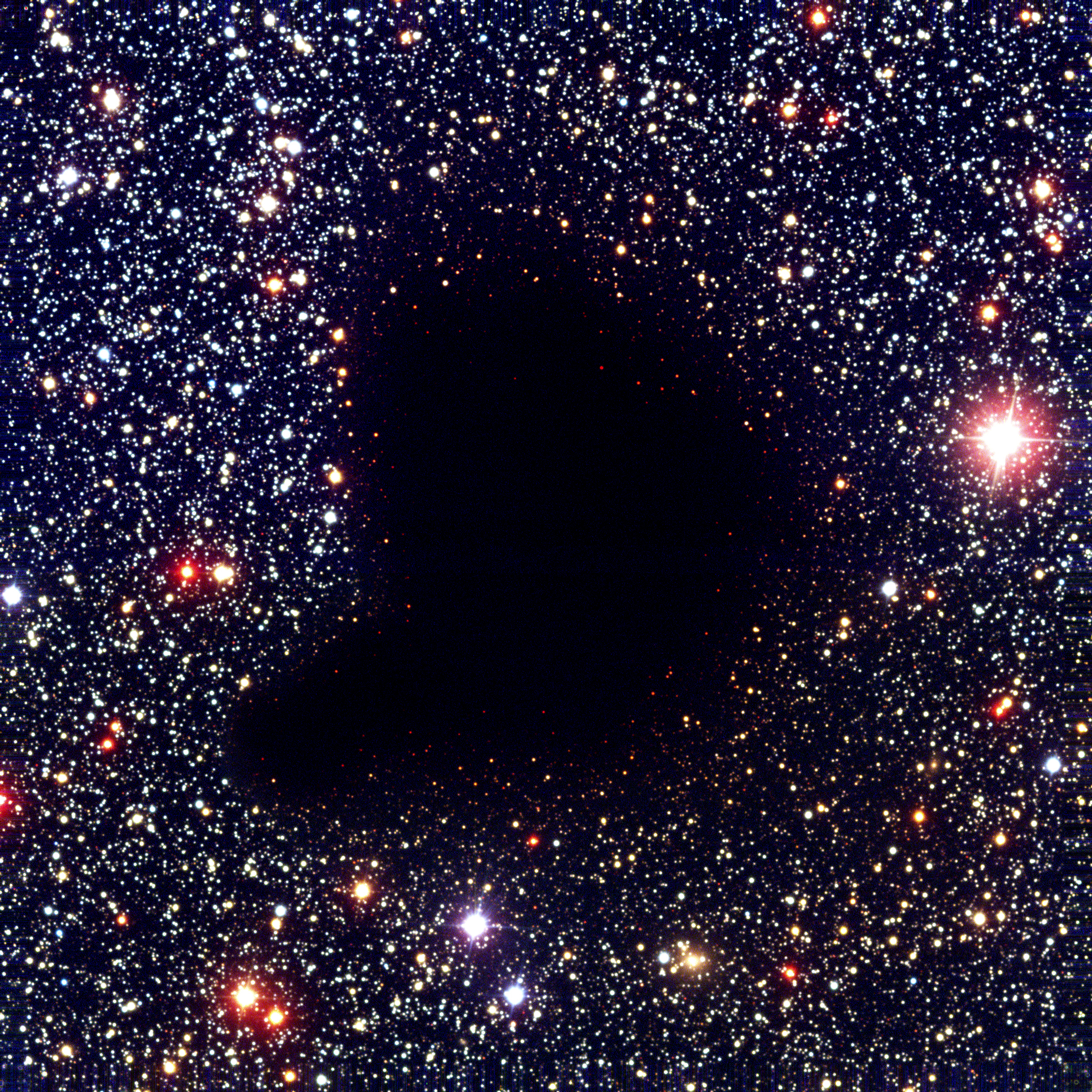
- Image of Barnard 68 in visible and near-infrared light

Observation data: J2000.0 epoch
- Right ascension: 17^{h} 22^{m} 38.2^{s}
- Declination: −23° 49′ 34″
- Distance: 125 pc
- Constellation: Ophiuchus

Physical characteristics
- Radius: 0.25 ly
- Designations: Barnard 68, LDN 57

Barnard 68 is a molecular cloud, dark absorption nebula or Bok globule, towards the southern constellation Ophiuchus and well within the Milky Way galaxy at a distance of about 125 parsecs (407 light-years). It is both close and dense enough that stars behind it cannot be seen from Earth. American astronomer Edward Emerson Barnard added this nebula to his catalog of dark nebulae in 1919. His catalog was published in 1927, at which stage it included some 350 objects. Because of its opacity, its interior is extremely cold, its temperature being about 16 K (−257 °C/−431 °F). Its mass is about twice that of the Sun, and it measures about half a light-year across.

== Characteristics ==
Despite being opaque at visible-light wavelengths, use of the Very Large Telescope at Cerro Paranal has revealed the presence of about 3,700 obscured background Milky Way stars, some 1,000 of which are only visible at infrared wavelengths. Careful measurements of the degree of obscuration resulted in a finely sampled and accurate mapping of the dust distribution inside the cloud. Observations obtained with the Herschel Space Observatory were able to constrain the distribution of the dust component and its temperature even more. Having a dark cloud in the solar neighborhood greatly facilitates observation and measurement. If not disrupted by external forces, the stability of dust clouds is a fine balance between outward pressure caused by the heat or pressure of the cloud's contents, and inward gravitational forces generated by the same particles (see Jeans instability and Bonnor–Ebert mass). This causes the cloud to wobble or oscillate in a manner like that of a large soap bubble or a water-filled balloon which is jiggled. In order for the cloud to become a star, gravity must gain the upper hand long enough to cause the cloud to collapse and reach a temperature and density where fusion can be sustained. When this happens, the much smaller size of the star's envelope signals a new balance between greatly increased gravity and radiation pressure.

The cloud's mass is about twice that of the Sun, and it measures about half a light-year across. Barnard 68's well-defined edges and other features show that it is on the verge of gravitational collapse, followed by becoming a star within the next 200,000 years or so.

The cloud is often confused with the Boötes Void, although the two have nothing in common. Pictures of Barnard 68 are often erroneously used to illustrate articles about the Boötes Void.

== See also ==
- Formation and evolution of the Solar System
- Dark Horse Nebula
