= Pipe Nebula =

Dark nebula in the constellation Ophiuchus

Dark nebula
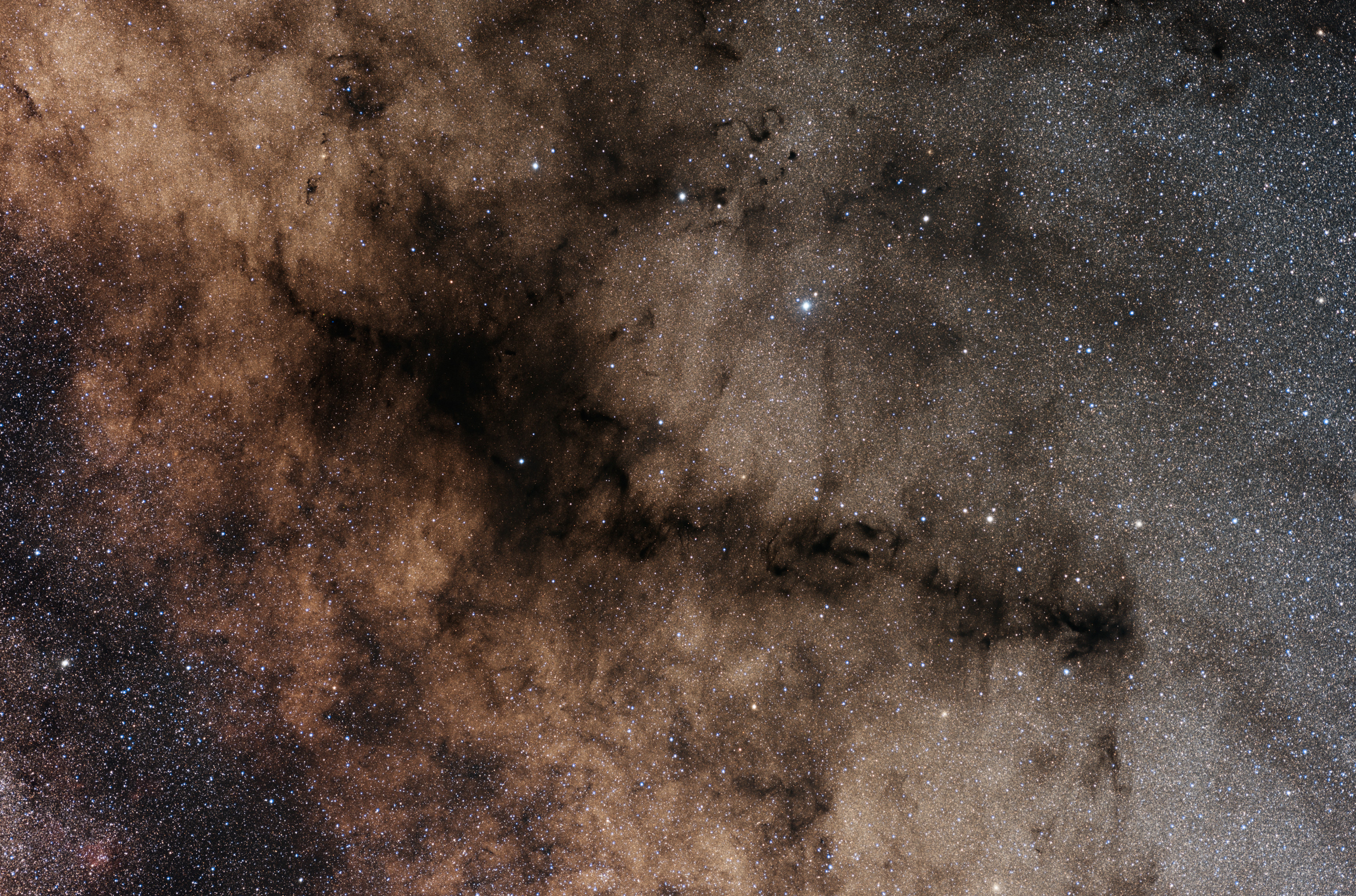
- Pipe Nebula (Barnard 59 is the mouthpiece)

Observation data: J2000 epoch
- Right ascension: 17^{h} 27^{m}
- Declination: −26° 56′
- Distance: 600 to 700 ly (180 to 220 pc)
- Apparent magnitude (V): –
- Apparent dimensions (V): Pipe Stem 300′ × 60′ Pipe Bowl 200′ × 140′
- Constellation: Ophiuchus

Physical characteristics
- Radius: – ly
- Absolute magnitude (V): –
- Notable features: –
- Designations: Barnard 59, 65–67, & 78; LDN 1773; LDN 42

The Pipe Nebula (also known as Barnard 59, 65–67, and 78) is a dark nebula in the constellation Ophiuchus and a part of the Dark Horse Nebula. It is a large but readily apparent smoking-pipe-shaped dust lane that obscures the Milky Way star clouds behind it. Clearly visible to the naked eye in the Southern United States under clear dark skies, but it is best viewed with 7× binoculars.

The nebula has two main parts: the Pipe Stem with an opacity of 6 which is composed of Barnard 59, 65, 66, and 67 (also known as LDN 1773) 300′ x 60′ RA: 17^{h} 21^{m} Dec: −27° 23′; and the Bowl of the Pipe with an opacity of 5 which is composed of Barnard 78 (also known as LDN 42) 200′ x 140′ RA: 17^{h} 33^{m} Dec: −26° 30′.

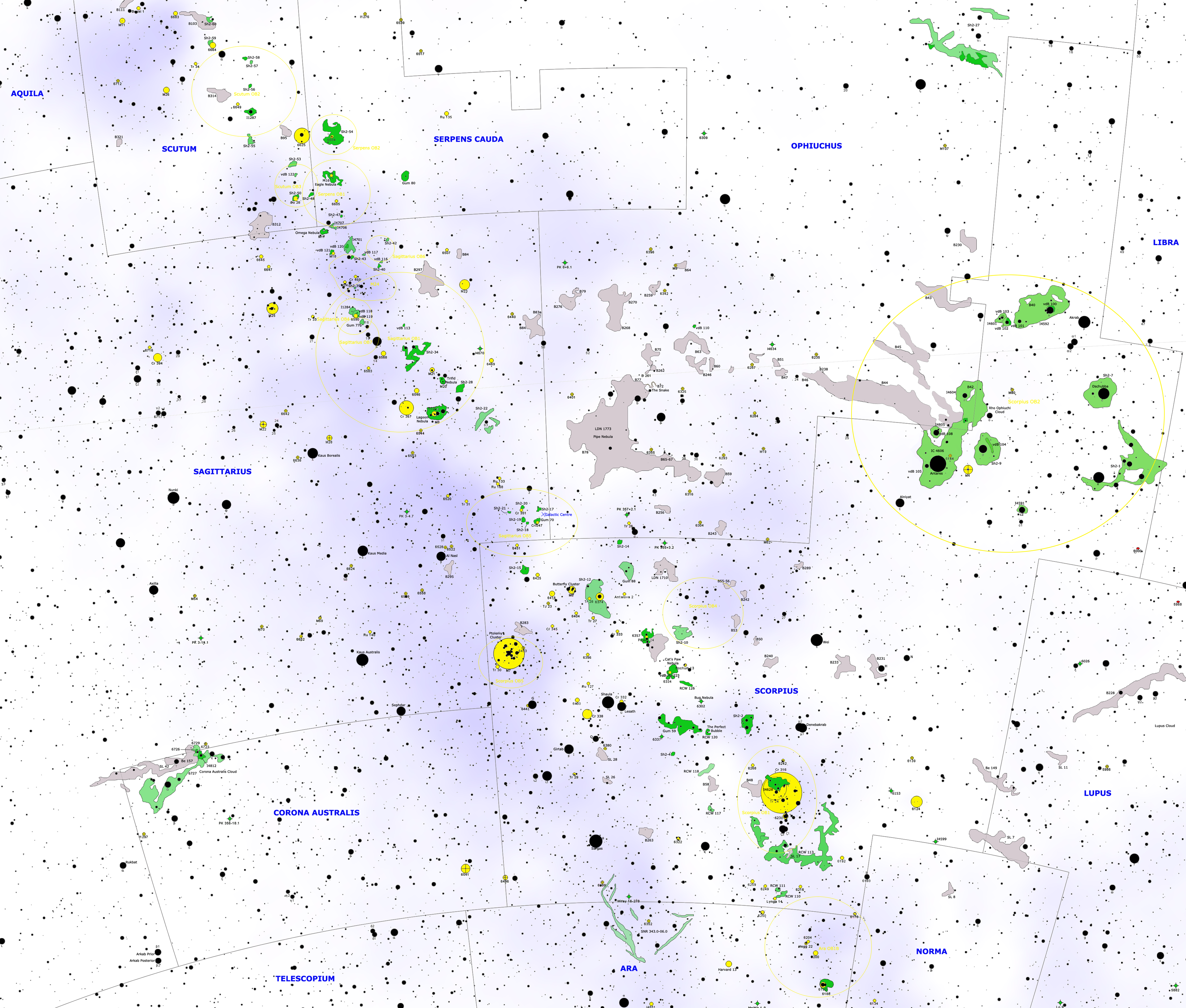
A starchart of the galactic central area, with the Pipe Nebula just above the Galactic Center.

== Gallery ==
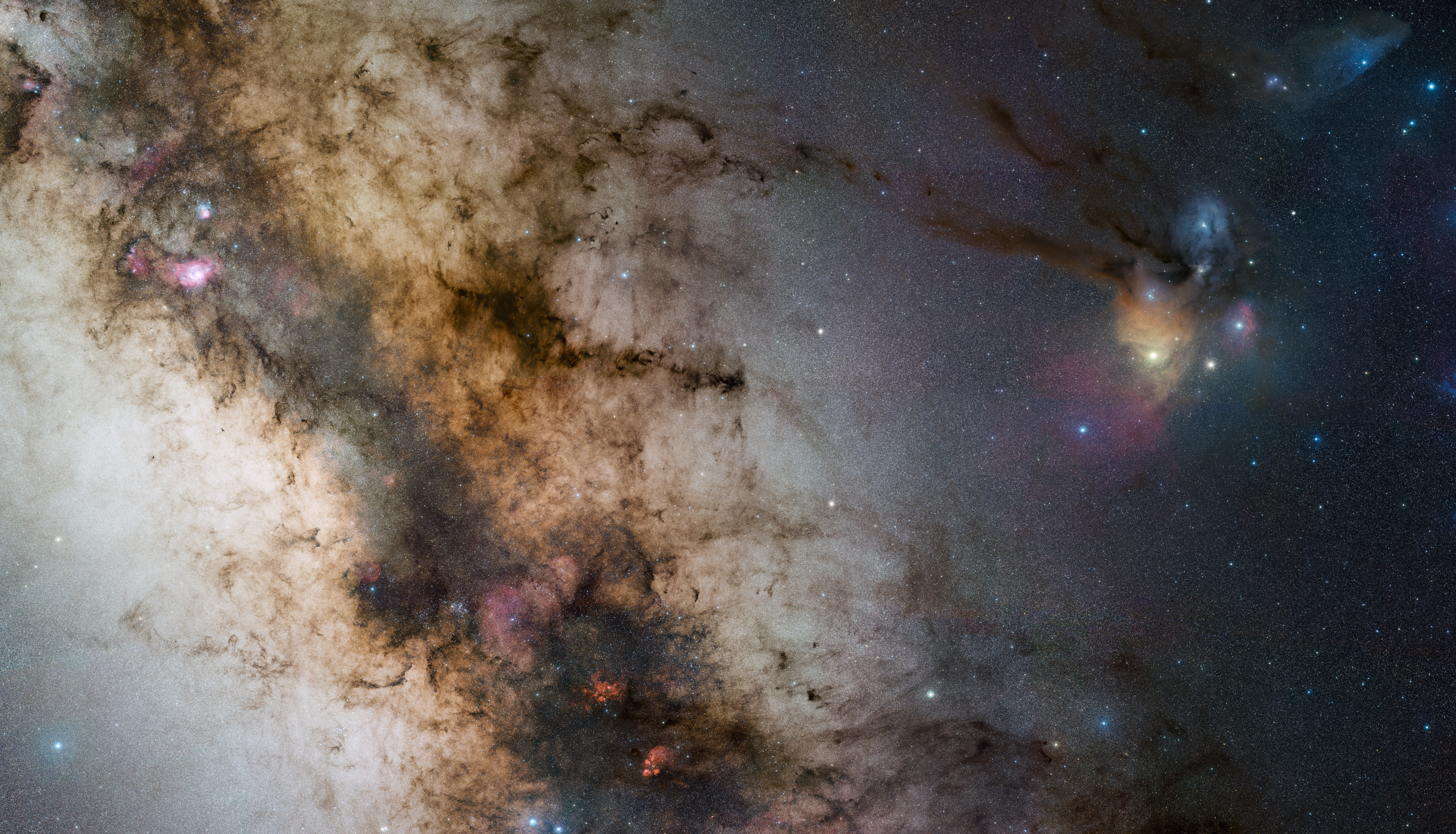
The Milky Way between Sagittarius and Scorpius: the Pipe Nebula is visible slightly above and left of center.

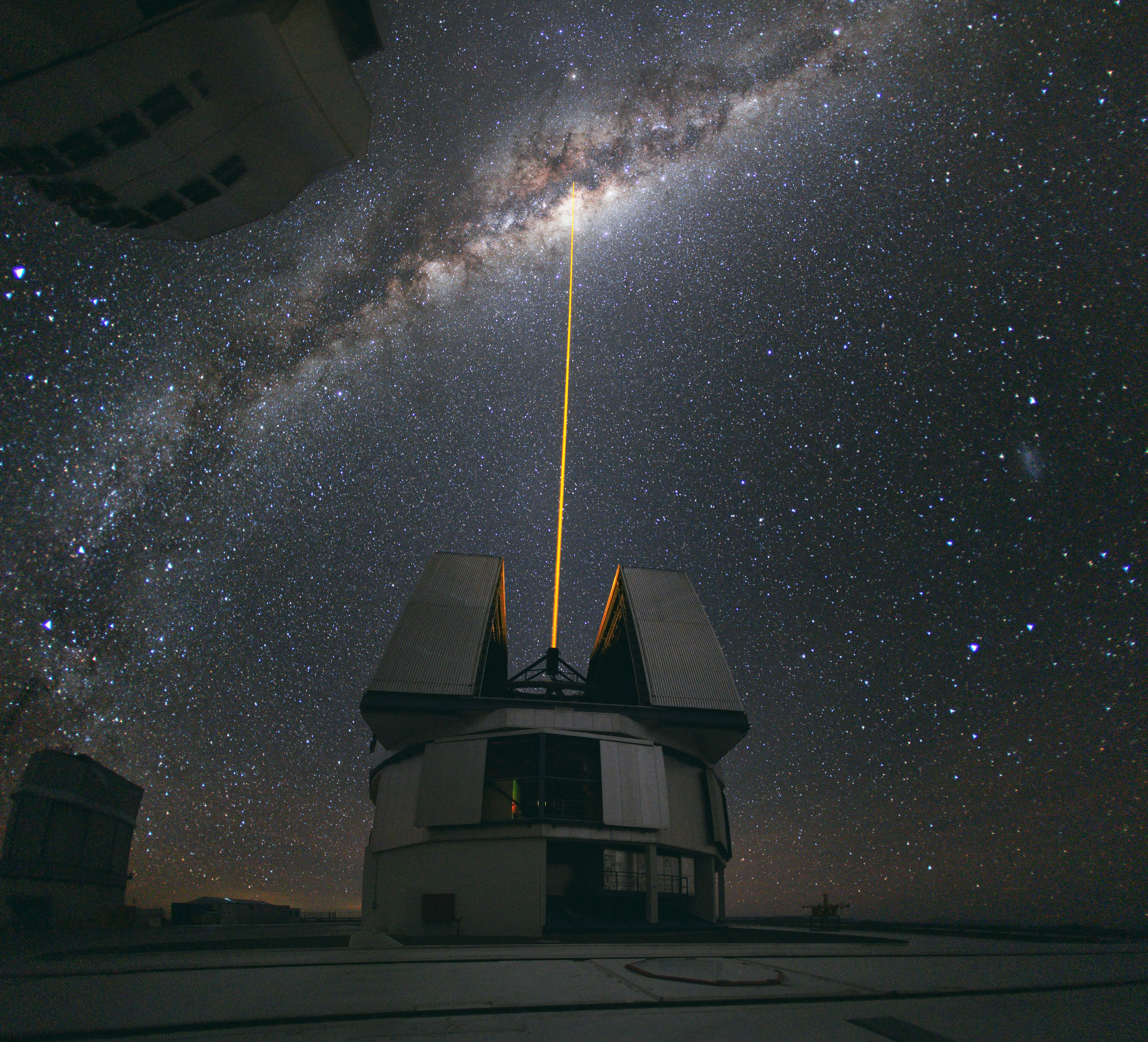
View of the Milky Way and the Great Rift from ESO's Very Large Telescope in Cerro Paranal, Chile. The laser beam points almost directly toward the Pipe Nebula.

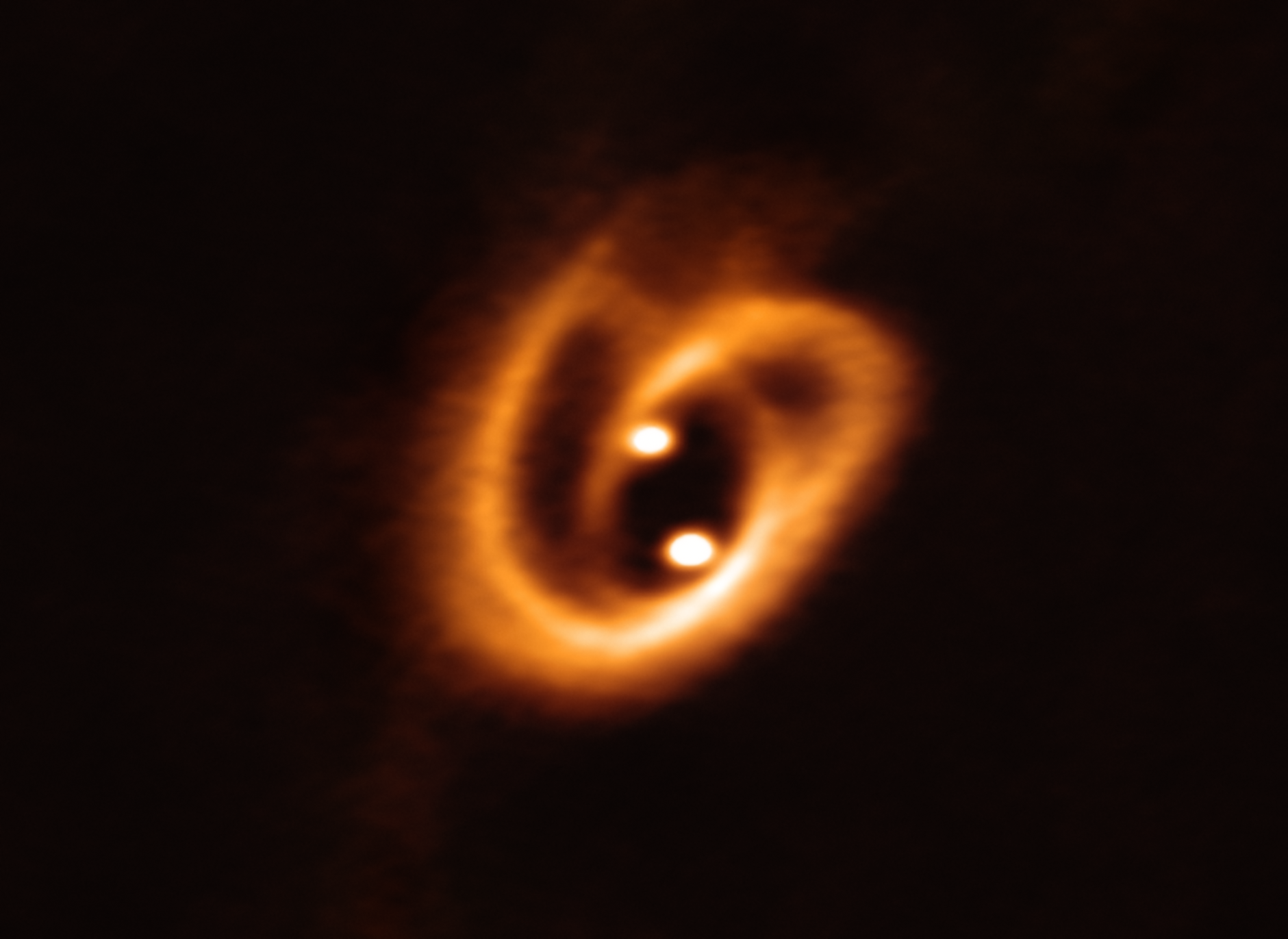
Two baby stars within the interstellar dust of the Pipe nebula.

Barnard 59 captured by the Wide Field Imager on the MPG/ESO 2.2-metre telescope at ESO’s La Silla Observatory.
