= Bok globule =

Isolated, small, and opaque nebula

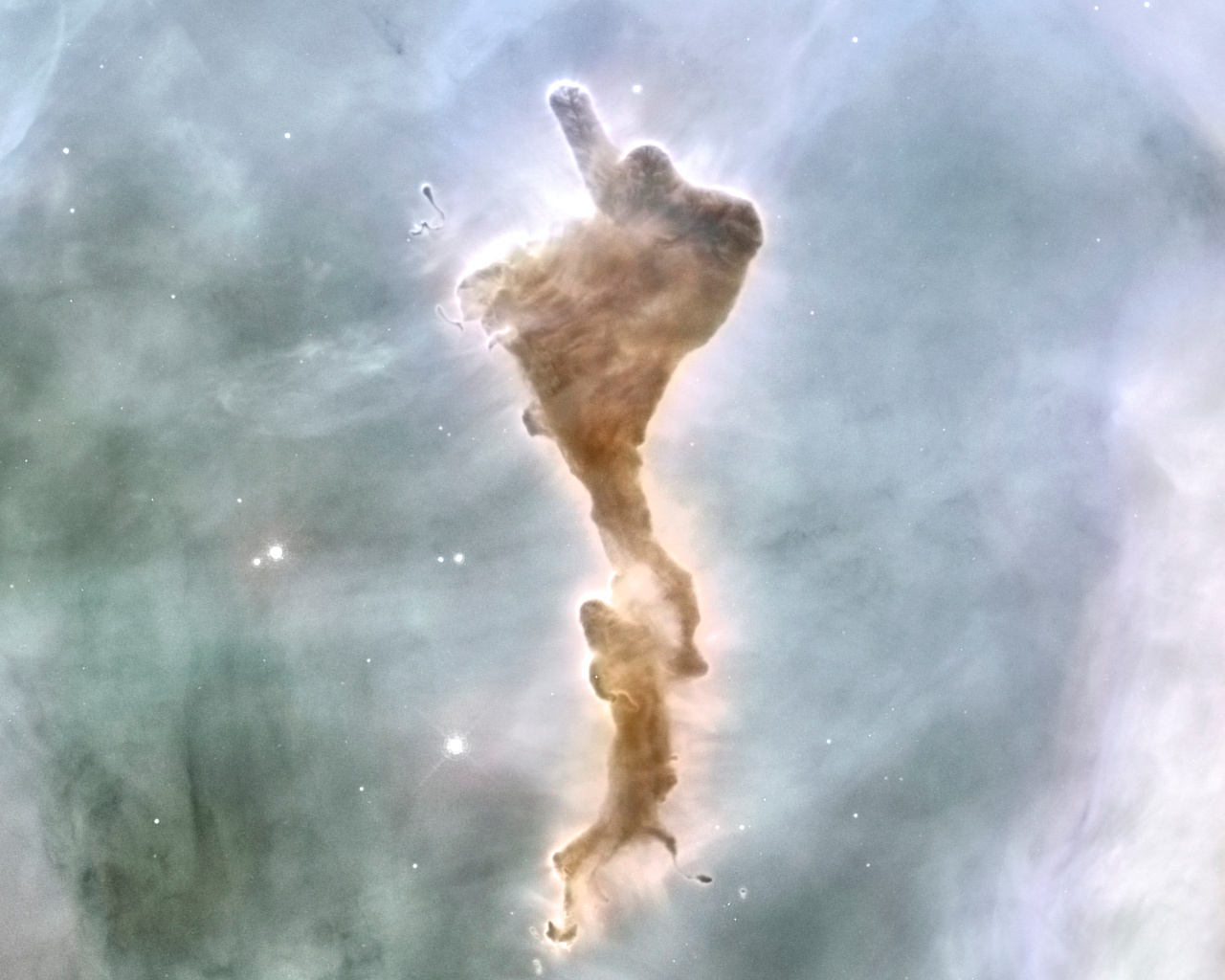
- The Finger of God Globule in the Carina Nebula

Characteristics
- Type: Isolated Dark nebulae
- Found: HII regions
- Mass range: 2M_{☉}-50M_{☉}
- Chemical composition: Molecular hydrogen, carbon oxides, helium, and silicate dust
- Size range: ~1ly

External links
- Media category
- Q213936

Additional Information
- Discovered: Bart Bok, 1940s

In astronomy, Bok globules are isolated and relatively small dark nebulae containing dense cosmic dust and gas from which star formation may take place. Bok globules are found within H II regions, and typically have a mass of about two to 50 solar masses contained within a region about a light year or so across (about 4.5×10^{47} m^{3}). They contain molecular hydrogen (H_{2}), carbon oxides and helium, and around 1% (by mass) silicate dust. Bok globules most commonly result in the formation of double- or multiple-star systems.

== History ==
Bok globules were first observed by astronomer Bart Bok in the 1940s. In an article published in 1947, he and Edith F. Reilly hypothesized that these clouds were "similar to insect's cocoons" that were undergoing gravitational collapse to form new stars, from which stars and star clusters were born. This hypothesis was difficult to verify due to the observational difficulties of establishing what was happening inside a dense dark cloud that obscured all visible light emitted from within it.

An analysis of near-infrared observations published in 1990 confirmed that stars were being born inside Bok globules. Further observations have revealed that some Bok globules contain embedded warm sources, some contain Herbig–Haro objects, and some show outflows of molecular gas. Millimeter-wave emission line studies have provided evidence for the infall of material onto an accreting protostar. It is now thought that a typical Bok globule contains about 10 solar masses of material in a region about a light-year or so across, and that Bok globules most commonly result in the formation of double- or multiple-star systems.

Bok globules are still a subject of intense research. Known to be some of the coldest objects in the natural universe, their structure and density remain something of a mystery. Methods applied so far have relied on column density derived from near-infrared extinction and even star counting in a bid to probe these objects further.

Bok globules that are irradiated by ultraviolet light from hot nearby stars exhibit stripping of materials to produce a tail. These types are called "cometary globules" (CG).

== Image gallery ==
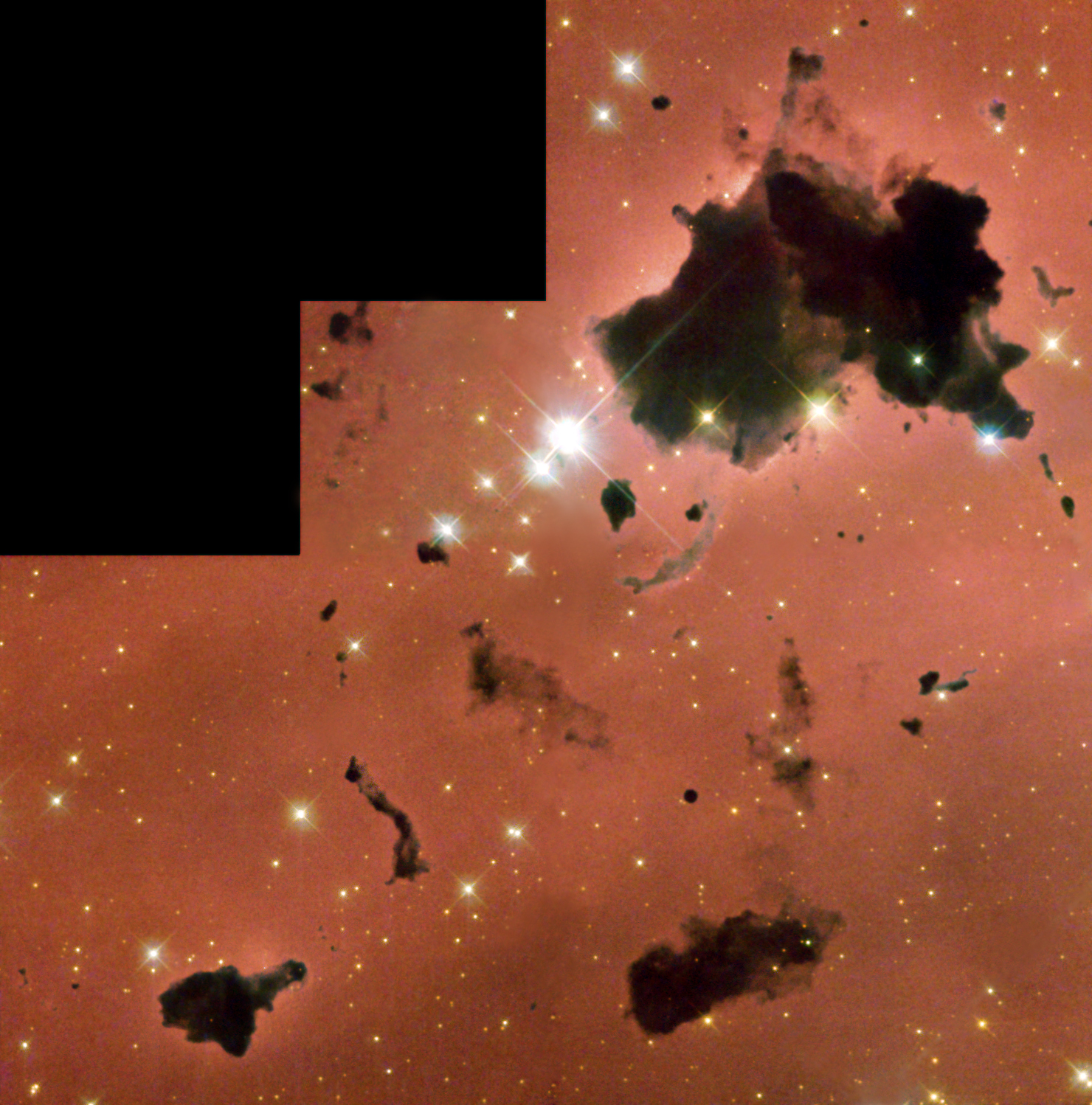
Thackeray's Globules, a set of Bok globules in the H II region IC 2944, taken with the WFPC2 instrument on the Hubble Space Telescope

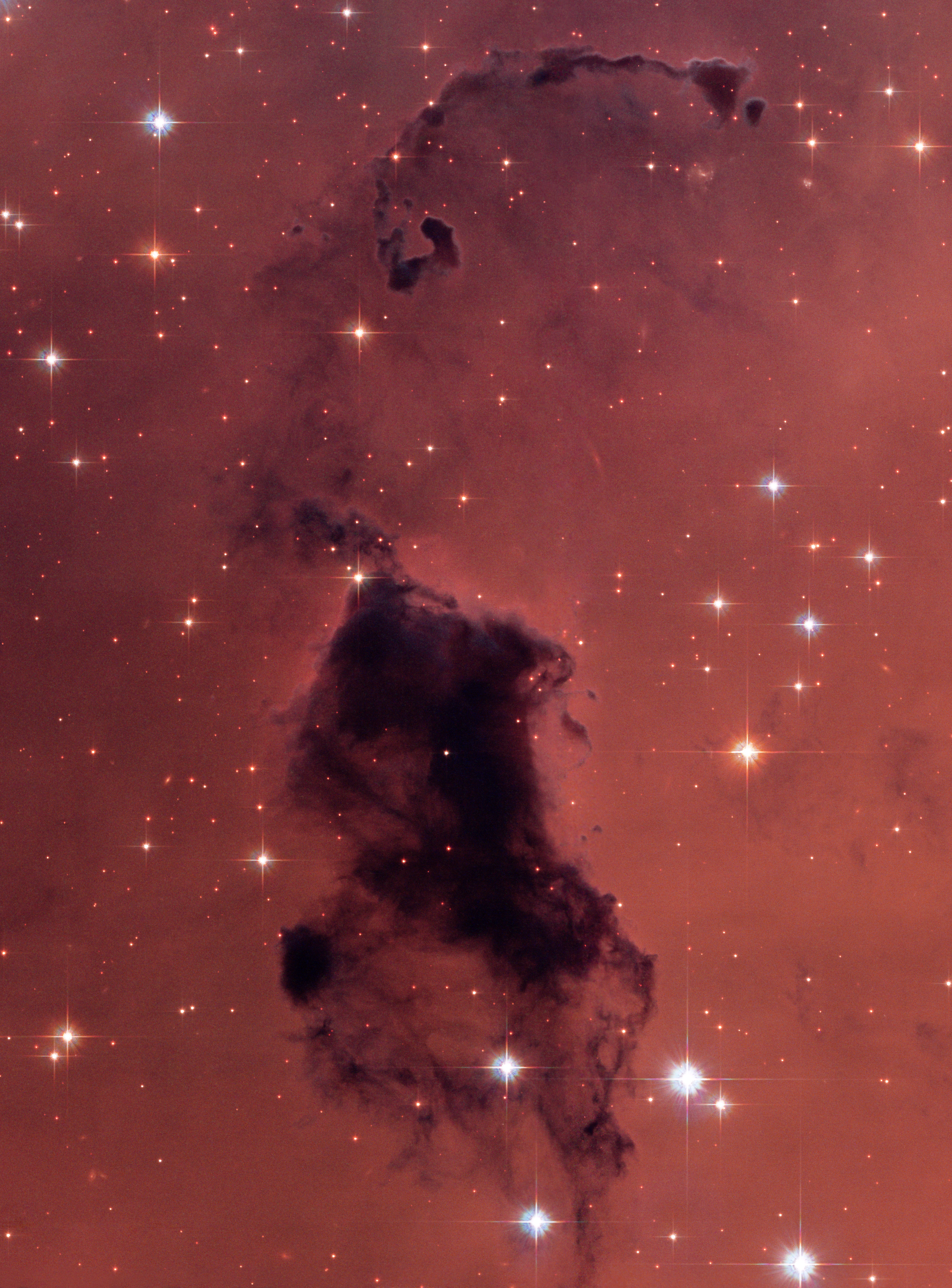
Bok globules located within the NGC 281 nebula (IC 1590 cluster)

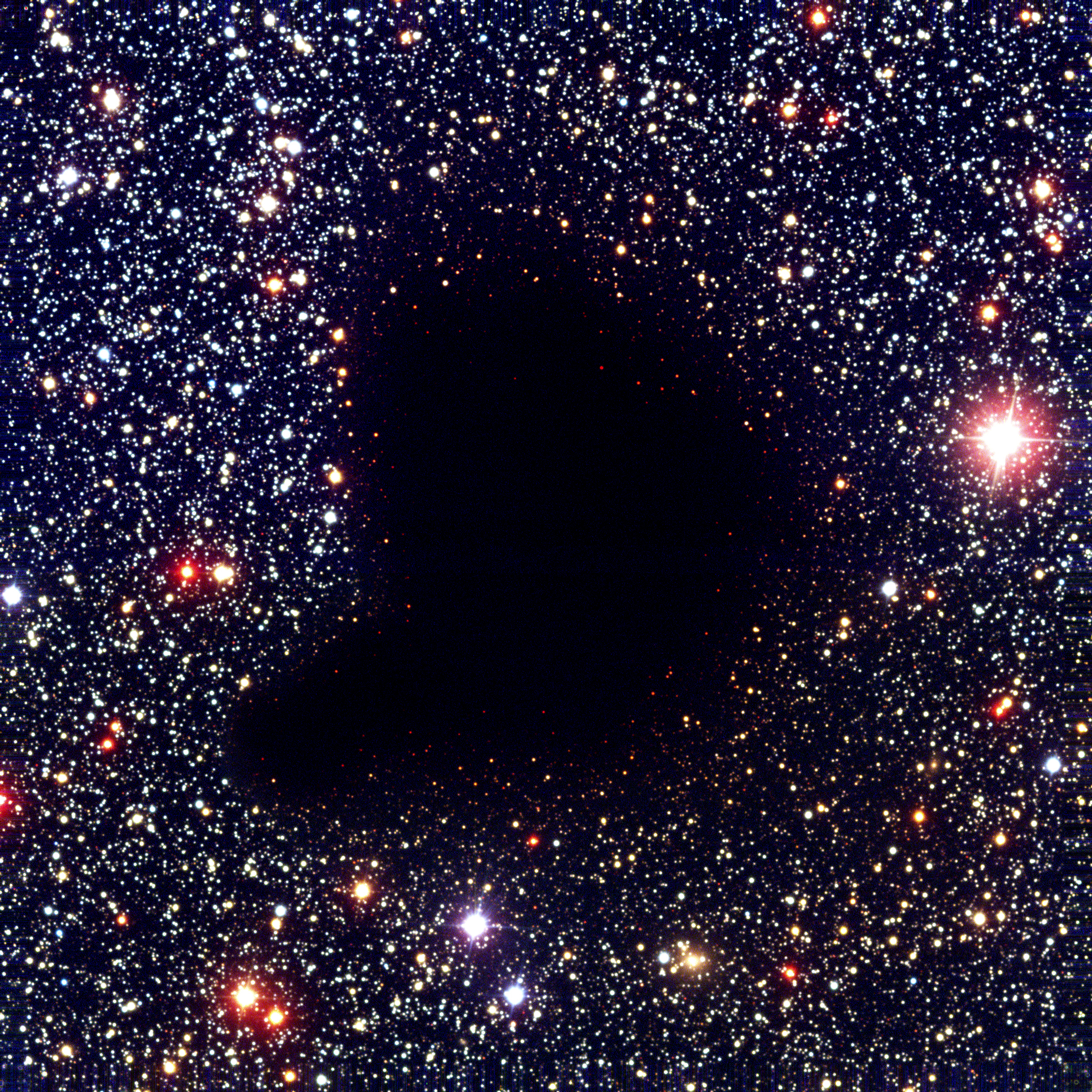
Barnard 68, at a distance of only 410 light-years, is one of the nearest Bok globules. Its diameter is about 12,500 AU (0.198 ly) (≈ 2 trillion km)

== See also ==
- Molecular cloud
- Barnard 68
- CG 4
- NGC 281
- IC 2944
