= Dark nebula =

Type of interstellar cloud that obscures visible light

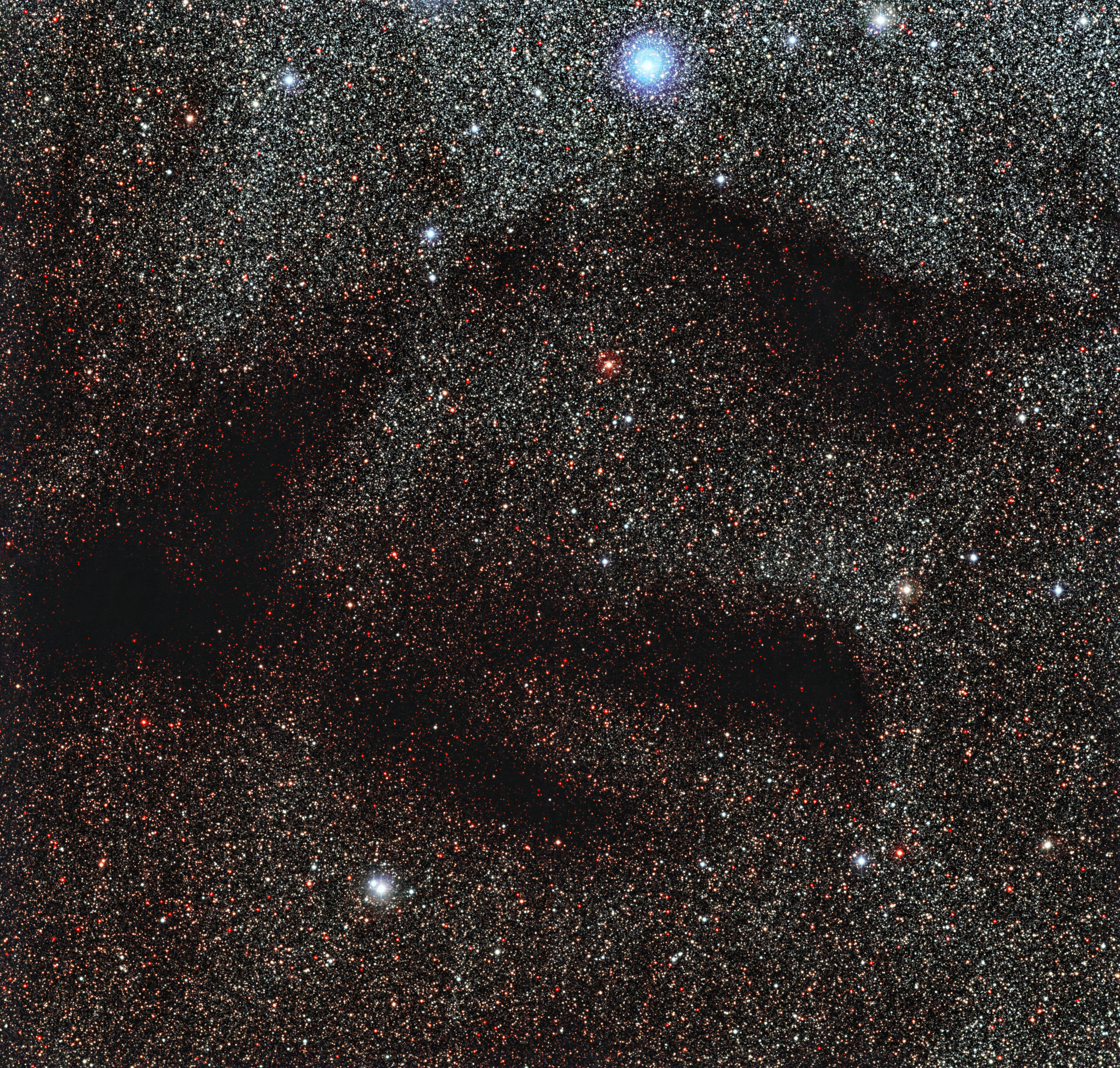
The dark nebula LDN 1768 in front of background stars

A dark nebula or absorption nebula is a type of interstellar cloud, particularly molecular clouds, that is so dense that it obscures the visible wavelengths of light from objects behind it, such as background stars and emission or reflection nebulae. The extinction of the light is caused by interstellar dust grains in the coldest, densest parts of molecular clouds. Clusters and large complexes of dark nebulae are associated with Giant Molecular Clouds. Isolated small dark nebulae are called Bok globules. Like other interstellar dust or material, the objects obscured are visible only using radio waves or infrared light, using techniques from radio and infrared astronomy

Dark clouds appear so because of sub-micrometre-sized dust particles, coated with frozen carbon monoxide and nitrogen, which effectively block the passage of light at visible wavelengths. Also present are molecular hydrogen, atomic helium, C^{18}O (CO with oxygen as the ^{18}O isotope), CS, NH_{3} (ammonia), H_{2}CO (formaldehyde), c-C_{3}H_{2} (cyclopropenylidene) and a molecular ion N_{2}H^{+} (diazenylium), all of which are relatively transparent.

The form of such dark clouds is very irregular: they have no clearly defined outer boundaries and sometimes take on convoluted serpentine shapes. The closest and largest dark nebulae are visible to the naked eye, since they are the least obscured by stars in between Earth and the nebula, and because they have the largest angular size, appearing as dark patches against the brighter background of the Milky Way like the Coalsack Nebula and the Great Rift. These naked-eye objects are sometimes known as dark cloud constellations and take on a variety of names.

In the central regions of dark nebulae and molecular clouds, events such as the formation of stars and maser emission take place.

== Complexes and constellations ==
Along with molecular clouds, dark nebulae make up molecular cloud complexes.

Dark nebulae form part of dark cloud constellations, recognisable in the night sky with the naked eye.

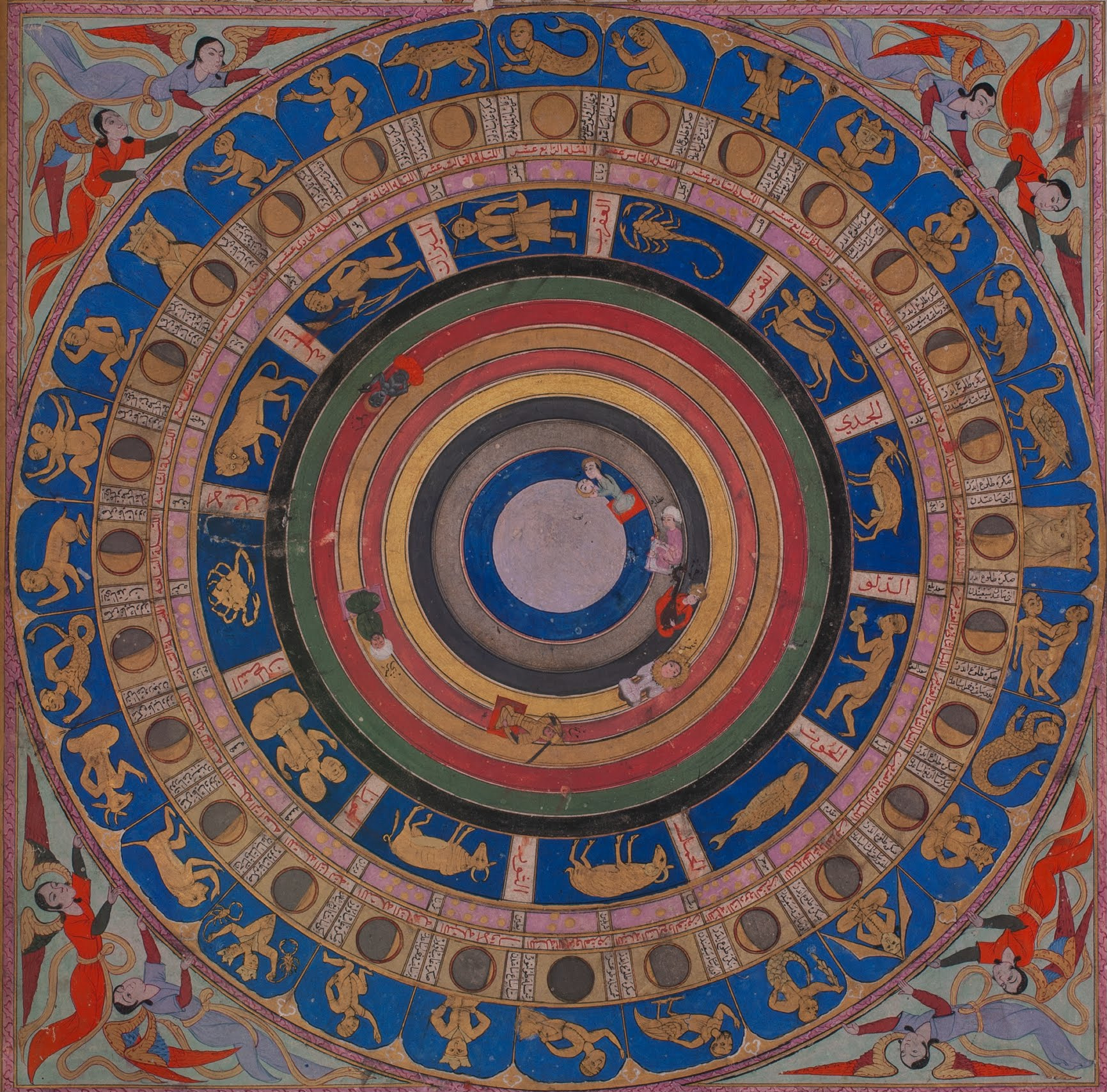
Ottoman period cosmographical map, with spheres of the planets, signs of the Zodiac and lunar mansions (Zubdat al-Tawarikh)

- Great Rift (astronomy)
  - Cygnus Rift
  - Serpens–Aquila Rift
  - Dark Horse (astronomy)
  - Rho Ophiuchi cloud complex
  - Emu in the sky

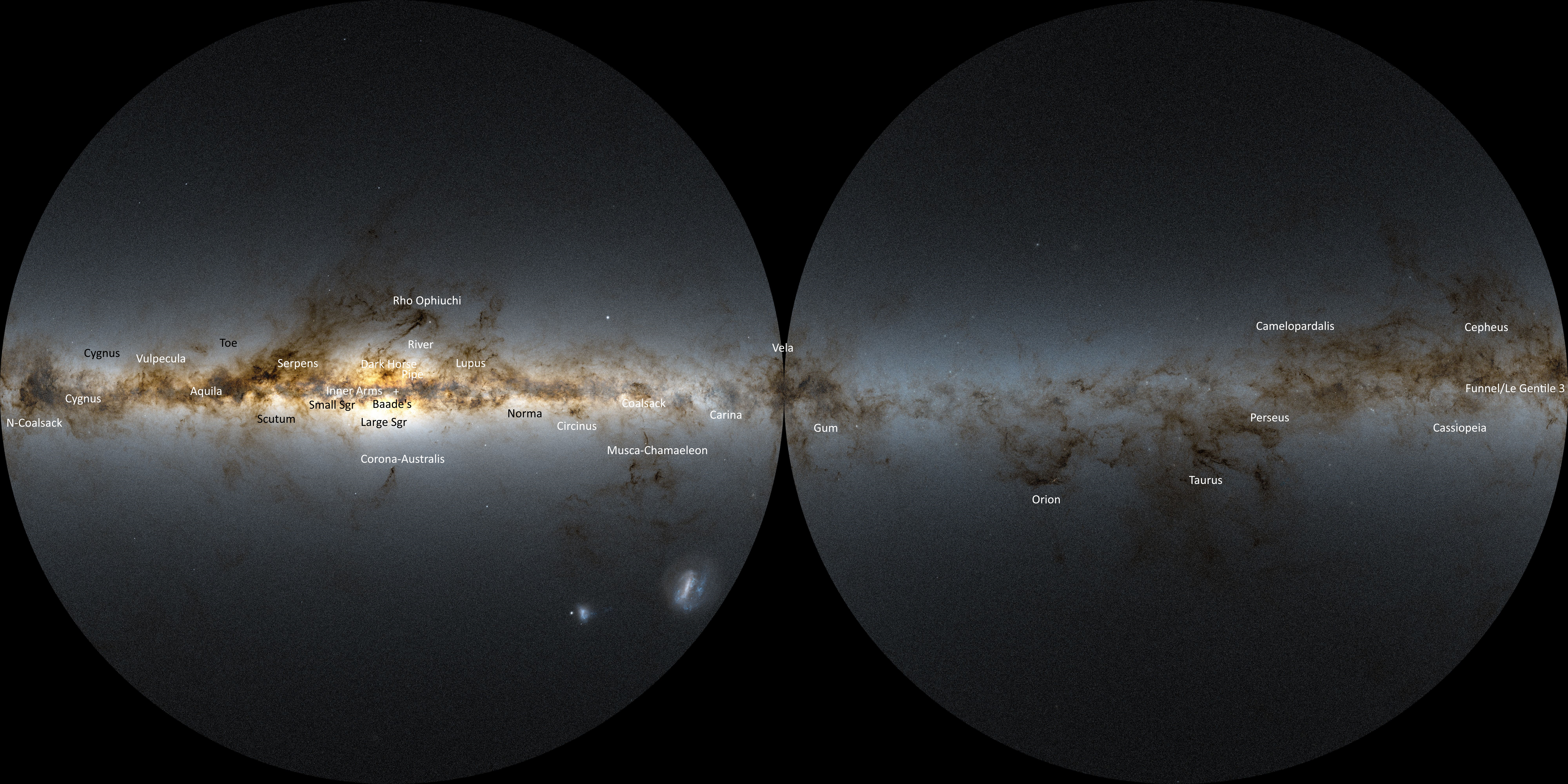
The Milky Way as seen by Gaia, with prominent dark features labeled in white, as well as prominent star clouds labeled in black

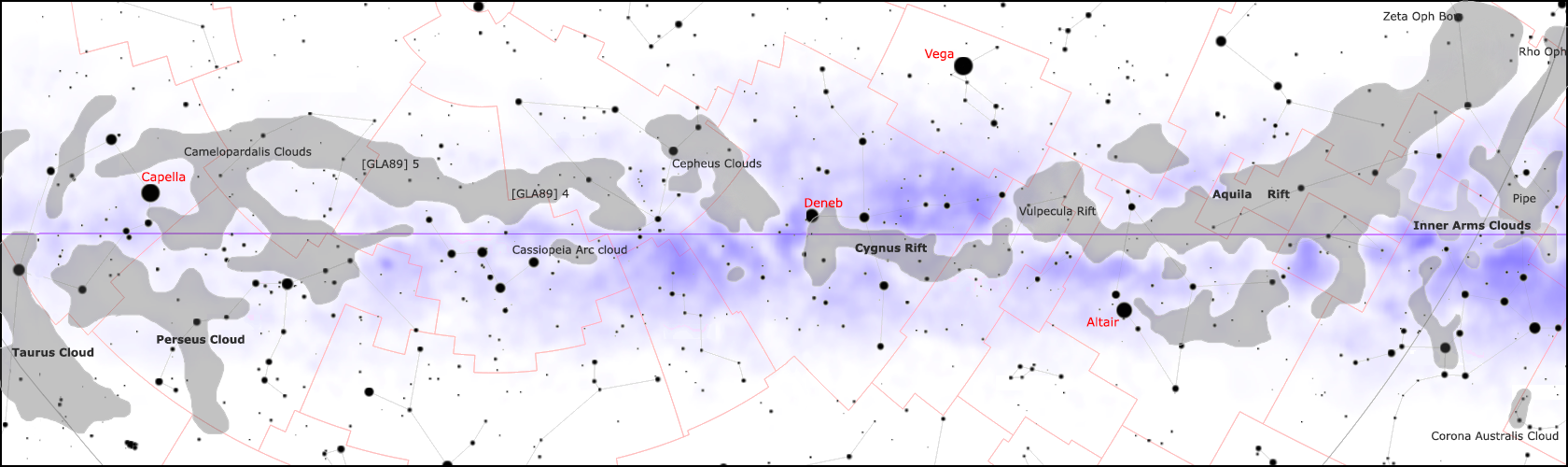
Main dark nebulae of the solar apex half of the galactic plane

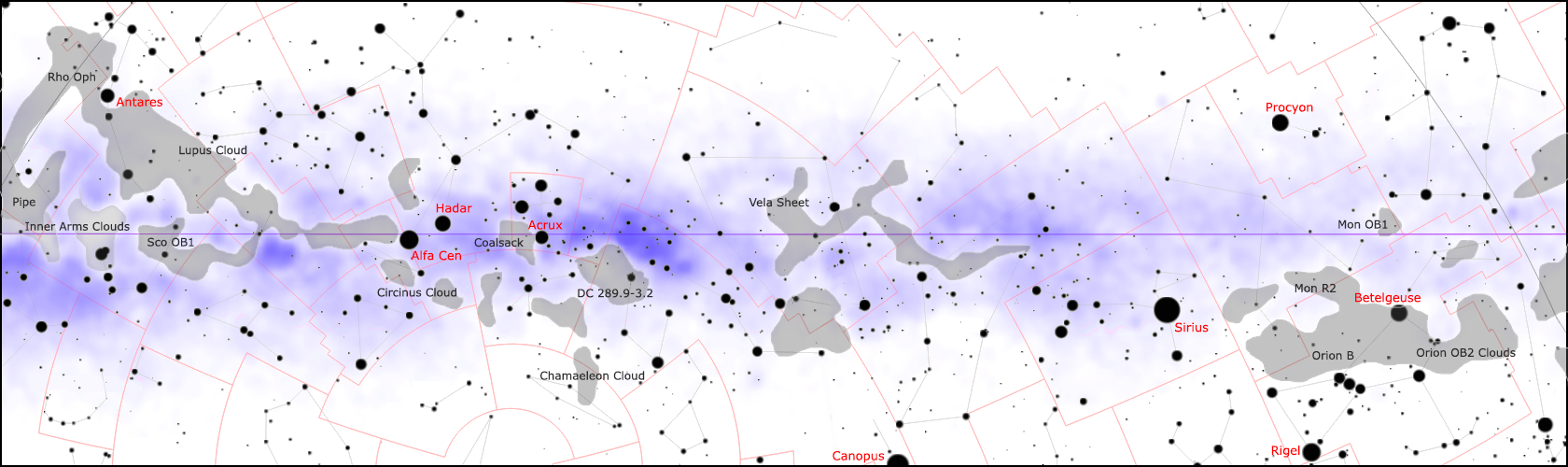
Main dark nebulae of the solar antapex half of the galactic plane

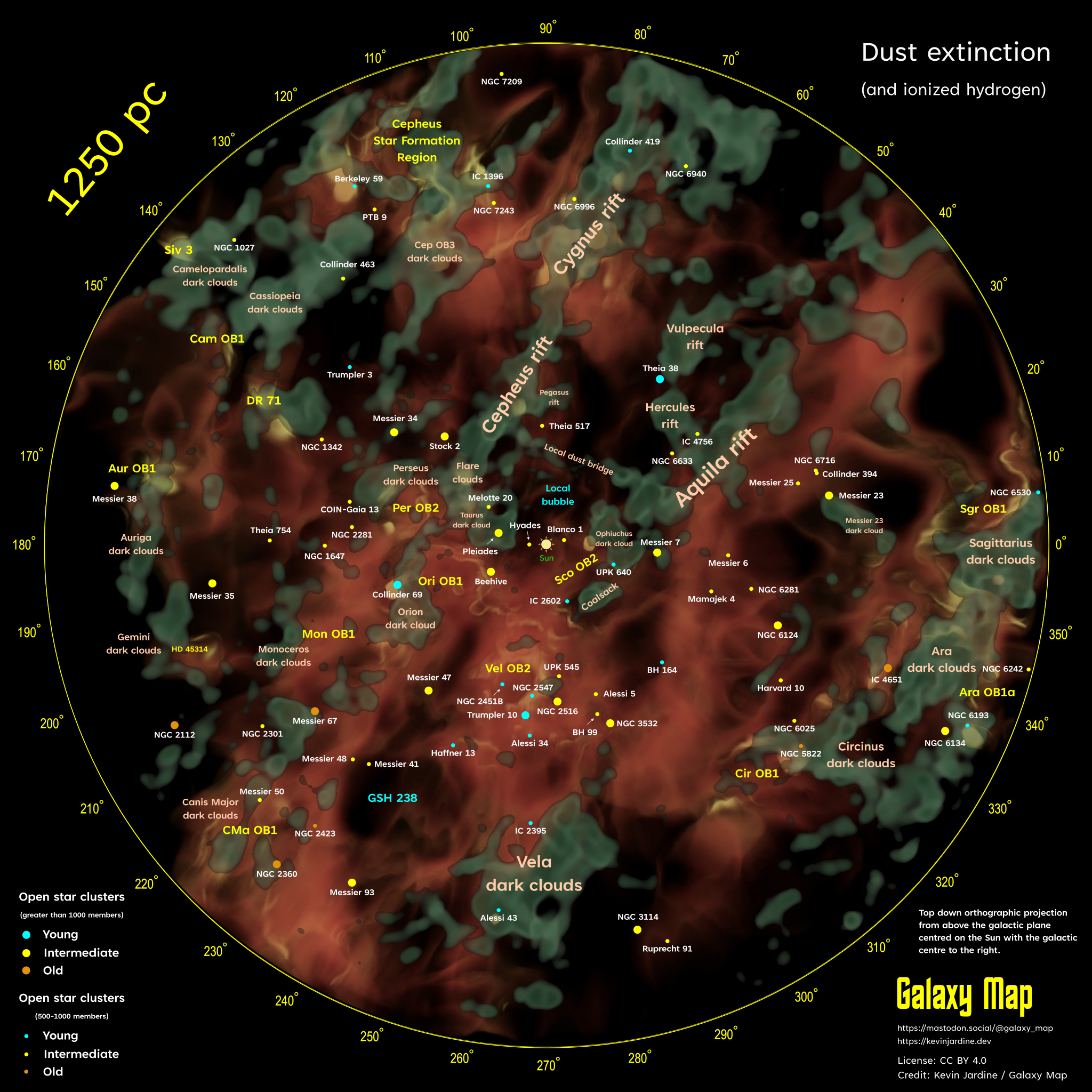
Dust extinction within 1250 pc

== See also ==
- List of dark nebulae
- Bok globule
- Infrared dark cloud
- Dark Cloud (disambiguation)
