= Stellar designations and names =

Process by which stars are named

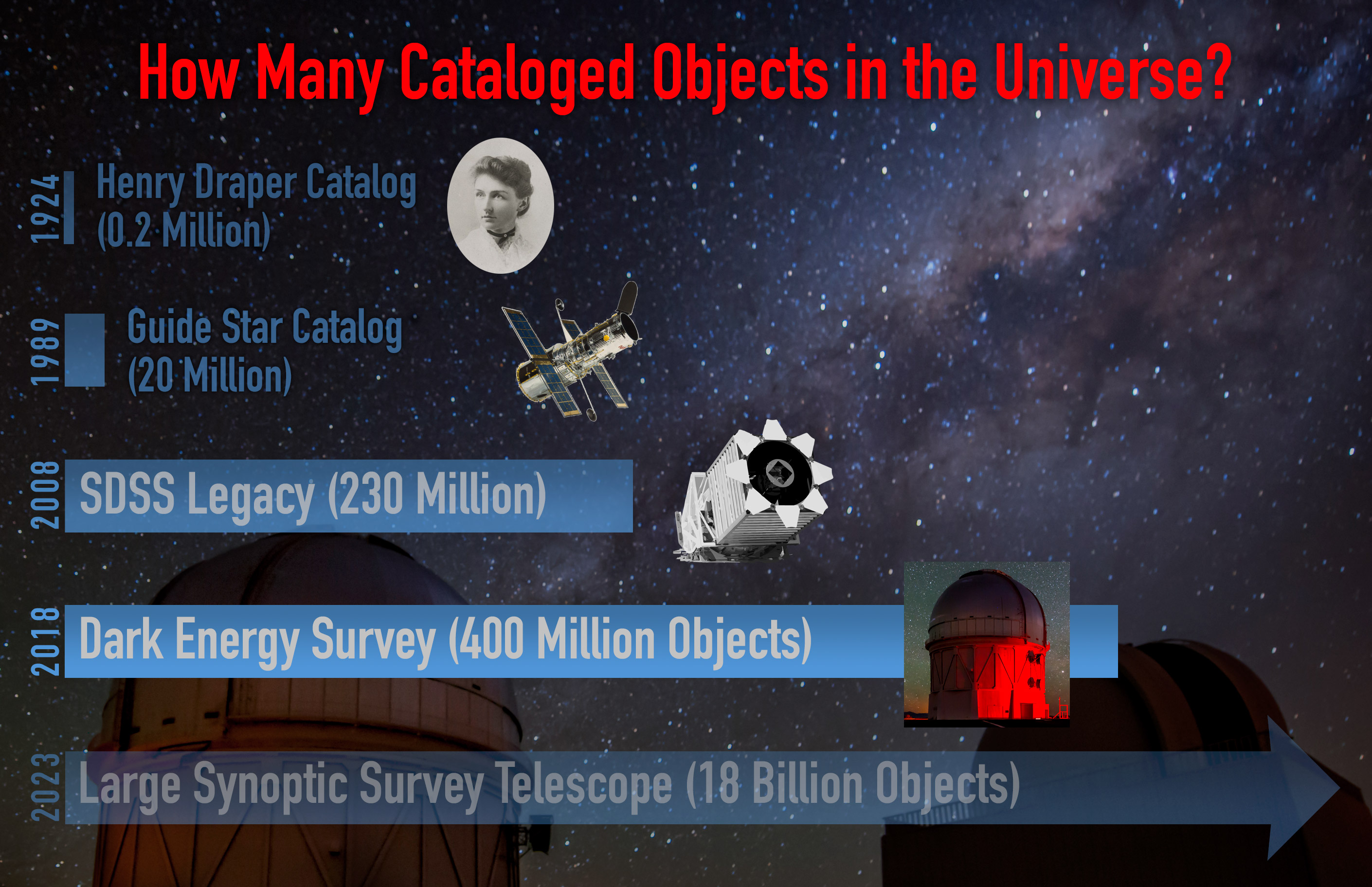
The trend toward ever more catalogued objects in the Universe

In astronomy, stars have a variety of different stellar designations and names, including catalogue designations, current and historical proper names, and foreign language names.

Only a tiny minority of known stars have proper names; all others have only designations from various catalogues or lists, or no identifier at all. Hipparchus in the 2nd century BC enumerated about 850 naked-eye stars. Johann Bayer in 1603 listed about twice this number. Only in the 19th century did star catalogues list the naked-eye stars exhaustively. The Bright Star Catalogue, which is a star catalogue listing all stars of apparent magnitude 6.5 or brighter, or roughly every star visible to the naked eye from Earth, contains 9,096 stars. The most voluminous modern catalogues list on the order of a billion stars, out of an estimated total of 200 to 400 billion in the Milky Way.

Proper names may be historical, often transliterated from Arabic or Chinese names. Such transliterations can vary so there may be multiple spellings. A smaller number of names have been introduced since the Middle Ages, and a few in modern times as nicknames have come into popular use, for example Sualocin for α Delphini and Navi for γ Cassiopeiae (now Tiansi).

The International Astronomical Union (IAU) has begun a process to select and formalise unique proper names for the brighter naked-eye stars and for other stars of popular interest. To the IAU, name refers to the (usually colloquial) term used for a star in everyday speech, while "designation is solely alphanumerical" and used almost exclusively in official catalogues and for professional astronomy. Many of the names and some of the designations in use today were inherited from before the IAU existed, and new ones are adopted from time to time by the IAU Working Group on Star Names.

== Proper names ==
Several hundred of the brightest stars had traditional names, most of which derived from Arabic, but a few from Latin. There were a number of problems with these names, however:

- Spellings were often not standardized (Almach or Almaach or Almak or Alamak)
- Many stars had more than one name of roughly equal popularity (Mirfak or Algenib or Alcheb; Regor or Suhail al Muhlif; Alkaid or Benetnasch; Gemma or Alphecca; Alpheratz and Sirrah)
- Because of imprecision in old star catalogs, it was not always clear exactly which star within a constellation a particular name corresponded to (e.g., Alniyat could refer to Sigma Scorpii or Tau Scorpii - now Paikauhale).
- Some stars in entirely different constellations had the same name: Alpha Persei (Algenib in Perseus, then formally named Mirfak) and Gamma Pegasi (Algenib in Pegasus); Gienah in Cygnus and Gienah in Corvus, Alnair in Grus and Alnair in Centaurus.

In 2016, the IAU organized a Working Group on Star Names (WGSN) to catalog and standardize proper names for stars. The WGSN's first bulletin dated July 2016 included a table of 125 stars comprising the first two batches of names approved by the WGSN (on 30 June and 20 July 2016) together with names of stars (including four traditional star names: Ain, Edasich, Errai and Fomalhaut) reviewed and adopted by the IAU Executive Committee Working Group on Public Naming of Planets and Planetary Satellites during the 2015 NameExoWorlds campaign and recognized by the WGSN. Further batches of names were approved on 21 August, 12 September, 5 October and 6 November 2016. These were listed in a table of 102 stars included in the WGSN's second bulletin dated November 2016. The next additions were done on 1 February 2017 (13 new star names), 30 June 2017 (29), 5 September 2017 (41), 17 November 2017 (3) and 1 June 2018 (17). All 330 names are included in the current List of IAU-approved Star Names, last updated on 1 June 2018 (with a minor correction posted on 11 June 2018).

In practice, names are only universally used for the very brightest stars (Sirius, Arcturus, Vega, etc.) and for a small number of slightly less bright but "interesting" stars (Algol, Polaris, Mira, etc.). For other naked eye stars, the Bayer or Flamsteed designation is often preferred.

In addition to the traditional names, a small number of stars that are "interesting" can have modern English names. For instance, two second-magnitude stars, Alpha Pavonis and Epsilon Carinae, were assigned the proper names Peacock and Avior respectively in 1937 by His Majesty's Nautical Almanac Office during the creation of The Air Almanac, a navigational almanac for the Royal Air Force. Of the fifty-seven stars included in the new almanac, these two had no traditional names. The RAF insisted that all of the stars must have names, so new names were invented for them. These names have been approved by the IAU WGSN.

The book Star Names: Their Lore and Meaning by R. H. Allen (1899) has had effects on star names:

- It lists many Assyrian/Babylonian and Sumerian star names recovered by archaeology, and some of these (e.g. Sargas and Nunki) have since been approved by the IAU WGSN.
- It lists many Chinese star names (e.g. Cih alias Tsih), though these have not come into general usage.
- Allen represented the "kh" sound by 'h' with a dot above (ḣ) and at least one astronomy book (by Patrick Moore), using Allen as a source, has misread this unfamiliar letter as 'li'.

=== Stars named for individuals ===
A few stars are named for individuals. These are mostly names in common use that were taken up by the scientific community at some juncture. The first such case (discounting characters from mythology) was Cor Caroli (α CVn), named in the 17th century for Charles I of England. The remaining examples are mostly named after astronomers, the best known are probably Barnard's Star (which has the highest known proper motion of any star and is thus notable even though it is far too faint to be seen with the naked eye), Kapteyn's Star and recently Tabby's Star.

The International Astronomical Union has held three NameExoWorlds contests to give proper names to exoplanets and their host stars, in 2014/5, 2019 and 2022. As a result, several stars were named after people, including Cervantes for Mu Arae, Copernicus for 55 Cancri A, and Rosalíadecastro (HD 149143) after the writer Rosalía de Castro.

== Catalogue designations ==
In the absence of any better means of designating a star, catalogue designations are generally used. Many star catalogues are used for this purpose; see star catalogues.

=== By constellation ===
The first modern schemes for designating stars systematically labelled them within their constellation.

- The Bayer designation is such a system, published by the German astronomer Johann Bayer in 1603. It introduced a system of designating the brightest stars in each constellation by means of Greek (or less often Latin) letters, and is still widely used. Bayer generally assigned letters by magnitude class: 1st magnitude stars received the earliest letters in the alphabet, followed by 2nd magnitude stars, and so forth (though there are many exceptions). The original list of Bayer designations contained 1,564 naked-eye stars, and several stars not catalogued by Bayer have been added by subsequent astronomers.
- The Flamsteed designation also lists stars by constellation, but by number rather than letter, ordering them by increasing right ascension rather than by decreasing brightness. These numbers were assigned not by Flamsteed himself but by the French astronomer J. J. Lalande in a French edition of Flamsteed's catalogue published in 1783.
- The Gould designation for stars visible from the southern hemisphere, introduced by Benjamin Gould (1879), also lists stars by constellation, numbered by increasing right ascension.
- Hevelius and Bode both numbered stars within constellations similarly. Their number systems have fallen out of use, but their designations even now are occasionally mistakenly treated as Flamsteed designations. 47 Tucanae, a number assigned by Bode, is a famous example.

=== Full-sky catalogues ===
Full-sky star catalogues detach the star designation from the star's constellation and aim at enumerating all stars with apparent magnitude greater than a given cut-off value.

- The Histoire céleste française (1801) enumerated 47,390 stars to magnitude 9.
- The Bonner Durchmusterung (1859) was the most complete star catalogue compiled without the aid of photography. It listed a total of 320,000 northern stars, expanded by the Cordoba Durchmusterung (1892) and the Cape Photographic Durchmusterung (1896).
- The Henry Draper Catalogue (1924) listed 225,300 stars to magnitude 10, extended to a total of 359,083 in 1949. The HD numbers remain in widespread use for stars that do not have a Flamsteed or Bayer designation.
- The Bright Star Catalogue of 1930 listed all stars brighter than magnitude 6. It was supplemented to include stars down to magnitude 7.1 in 1983.
- The Catalogue astrographique was compiled between 1891 and 1950 with the aim of listing all stars to magnitude 11, resulting in a list of 4.6 million stars. It is under continued development, now under custody of the U.S. Naval Observatory.
- The USNO-B1.0 catalogue contains over a billion objects, and is also under continued development at the U.S. Naval Observatory.
- The online Guide Star Catalog II (2008) contains 945 million stars to magnitude 21.

=== Variable designations ===
Variable stars that do not have Bayer designations are assigned designations in a variable star scheme that superficially extends the Bayer scheme with uppercase Latin letters followed by constellation names, starting with single letters R to Z, and proceeding to pairs of letters. Such designations mark them as variable stars. Examples include R Cygni, RR Lyrae, and GN Andromedae. (Many variable stars also have designations in other catalogues.)

=== Exoplanet searches ===
When a planet is detected around a star, the star is often given a name and number based on the name of the telescope or survey mission that discovered it and based on how many planets have already been discovered by that mission e.g. HAT-P-9, WASP-1, COROT-1, Kepler-4, TRAPPIST-1.

== Sale of star names by non-scientific entities ==
Star naming rights are not available for sale via the IAU or any other scientific body. Rather, star names are selected on a non-commercial basis by the IAU Working Group on Star Names. However, there are a number of non-scientific "star-naming" companies that offer to assign personalized nicknames to stars within their own private catalogs. These names are used only by that company and are only available for viewing on their web site or on purchased items. Names by commercial entities are not recognized by the astronomical community, or by competing star-naming companies. The New York City Department of Consumer Affairs has issued violation notices against companies which claimed to sell stars or the naming rights to them. A survey conducted by amateur astronomers discovered that just over half of consumers would still want to "name a star" with a non-scientific star-naming company even though they have been warned or informed such naming is not recognized by the astronomical community.

== See also ==
- List of Arabic star names
- NameExoWorlds
- List of proper names of stars
- Star Names: Their Lore and Meaning
