= Rho Ophiuchi =

Multiple star system in the constellation Ophiuchus

ρ Ophiuchi
- Location of ρ Ophiuchi (circled red)

Observation data Epoch J2000.0 Equinox ICRS
- Constellation: Ophiuchus
- Right ascension: 16^{h} 25^{m} 35.11766^{s}
- Declination: −23° 26′ 49.8150″
- Apparent magnitude (V): 4.63

Characteristics

ρ Oph AB
- Spectral type: B2/3V + B2V
- U−B color index: −0.56
- B−V color index: +0.24

Astrometry

ρ Oph AB
Radial velocity (R_{v})	−14.6±1.5 km/s
Proper motion (μ)	RA: −5.53 mas/yr Dec.: −21.74 mas/yr
Parallax (π)	7.19±0.13 mas
Distance	451±12 ly (138.2±3.6 pc)
Absolute magnitude (M_{V})	−2.5±0.3

Orbit
Primary	ρ Oph Aa
Secondary	ρ Oph Ab
Period (P)	87.831±0.010 days
Semi-major axis (a)	0.995±0.026 AU
Eccentricity (e)	0.17931±0.00017
Inclination (i)	71.348±0.020°
Longitude of the node (Ω)	303.385±0.034°
Periastron epoch (T)	60101.11 RJD
Argument of periastron (ω) (secondary)	4.80±0.24°
Semi-amplitude (K_{1}) (primary)	55.5±3.6 km/s
Semi-amplitude (K_{2}) (secondary)	65.7±3.6 km/s

Orbit
Primary	ρ Oph A
Secondary	ρ Oph B
Period (P)	2,398±326 years
Semi-major axis (a)	4.25±0.79″
Eccentricity (e)	0.675±0.322
Inclination (i)	135.3±6.0°
Longitude of the node (Ω)	77.5±13.5°
Periastron epoch (T)	B 2327±343
Argument of periastron (ω) (secondary)	226.1±15.3°

Orbit
Primary	ρ Oph D
Secondary	ρ Oph E
Period (P)	675.5±32.5 years
Semi-major axis (a)	1.01±0.15″
Eccentricity (e)	0.707±0.112
Inclination (i)	134.8±2.7°
Longitude of the node (Ω)	152.7±4.6°
Periastron epoch (T)	B 2008.6±34.2
Argument of periastron (ω) (secondary)	260.4±1.1°

Details

ρ Oph Aa
Mass	9.21±0.79 M_{☉}
Radius	4.2±0.3 R_{☉}
Luminosity	4,270+980 −800 L_{☉}
Surface gravity (log g)	4.25±0.25 cgs
Temperature	23,000±1,000 K
Rotation	1.205 days
Rotational velocity (v sin i)	206±5 km/s
Age	15±6 Myr

ρ Oph Ab
Mass	7.79±0.70 M_{☉}
Radius	3.1±0.2 R_{☉}
Luminosity	1,000+400 −290 L_{☉}
Surface gravity (log g)	4.25±0.25 cgs
Temperature	19,000±1,000 K
Rotational velocity (v sin i)	227±5 km/s
Age	15±6 Myr

ρ Oph B
Mass	4.507+0.059 −0.060 M_{☉}
Radius	6.78+0.69 −0.22 R_{☉}
Luminosity	8,046+600 −400 L_{☉}
Surface gravity (log g)	3.41+0.96 −0.23 cgs
Temperature	11,568+980 −501 K
Metallicity [Fe/H]	0.35+0.78 −0.25 dex
Rotational velocity (v sin i)	233±11 km/s

ρ Oph Ca
Mass	4.8±0.4 M_{☉}
Radius	2.6±0.1 (Note: The star is sligthly flattened due to its fast rotation; the polar radius is equivalent to 0.968+0.001 −0.003 of the equatorial radius.) R_{☉}
Luminosity	400 L_{☉}
Surface gravity (log g)	4.01±0.15 cgs
Temperature	16,800±1,500 K
Rotation	0.86389657(4) days
Rotational velocity (v sin i)	156+7 −4 km/s
Age	7+3 −1 Myr

ρ Oph Cb
Mass	1.03 M_{☉}
Radius	1.31 R_{☉}
Surface gravity (log g)	4.21 cgs
Temperature	4,380 K

ρ Oph Cc
Mass	0.40 M_{☉}
Radius	0.89 R_{☉}
Surface gravity (log g)	4.14 cgs
Temperature	3,540 K

ρ Oph D
Mass	3.06 M_{☉}

ρ Oph E
Mass	1.97 M_{☉}

Other designations
- ρ Oph, 5 Oph, WDS J16256-2327
- ρ Oph AB: CD−23°12861, HIP 80473
- ρ Oph A: HD 147933, HR 6112, SAO 184382
- ρ Oph B: HD 147934, HR 6113, SAO 184381
- ρ Oph C: CD−23°12862, HIP 80474, SAO 184383

Database references
SIMBAD	ρ Oph
- ρ Oph A
- ρ Oph B
- ρ Oph C
- ρ Oph D/E

Rho Ophiuchi (ρ Ophiuchi) is a multiple star system in the constellation Ophiuchus. The central triple system has an apparent magnitude of 4.63. Based on the central system's parallax, it is located about 450 light-years distant. The other three stars in the system appear to be slightly farther away.

== System ==
D
P = 675.5 yr
E
2.82' separation
Aa
P = 87.8 d
Ab
P = 2,398 yr
B
2.5' separation
C

Hierarchy of orbits in the system

The central system is known as Rho Ophiuchi AB. It consists of three blue-colored subgiants or main-sequence stars, designated Rho Ophiuchi Aa, Ab and B, respectively. Rho Ophiuchi A is a spectroscopic binary with an orbital period of 88 days and an orbital separation of 1.1 astronomical units.

Farther away is the B companion, a visual binary whose sky-projected distance from the inner pair appears to be 3.1″, corresponding to a separation of at least 344 AU. However, the actual separation is larger, and the two take about 2,400 years to complete an orbit. The two stars dominate the radiation field around the Rho Ophiuchi cloud complex.

Rho Ophiuchi A emits weak X-rays due to the strong magnetic field of the secondary companion, Rho Ophiuchi Ab, whose dipole strength is 4 kG. Rho Ophiuchi B also emits X-rays at an intensity much higher than the expected for a B2V-type star, and appear to show flares on its light curve and spectrum, suggesting it may be a binary star with a G or K-type companion, similar to Algol.

Several other stars are located close to Rho Ophiuchi AB. HD 147932 is located 2.5 arcminutes away (at least 17,000 AU), and is known as Rho Ophiuchi C. It is a triple star itself, with two additional components discovered using interferometry. HD 147888 is located 2.82 arcminutes away (at least 19,000 AU), and is known as Rho Ophiuchi DE. The D and E components form a binary with an orbital period of around 680 years. Stars Ca and D are both B-type main-sequence stars, while Cb is either a G or F-type main-sequence star and Cc is a pre-main sequence red dwarf.

== Cloud complex ==
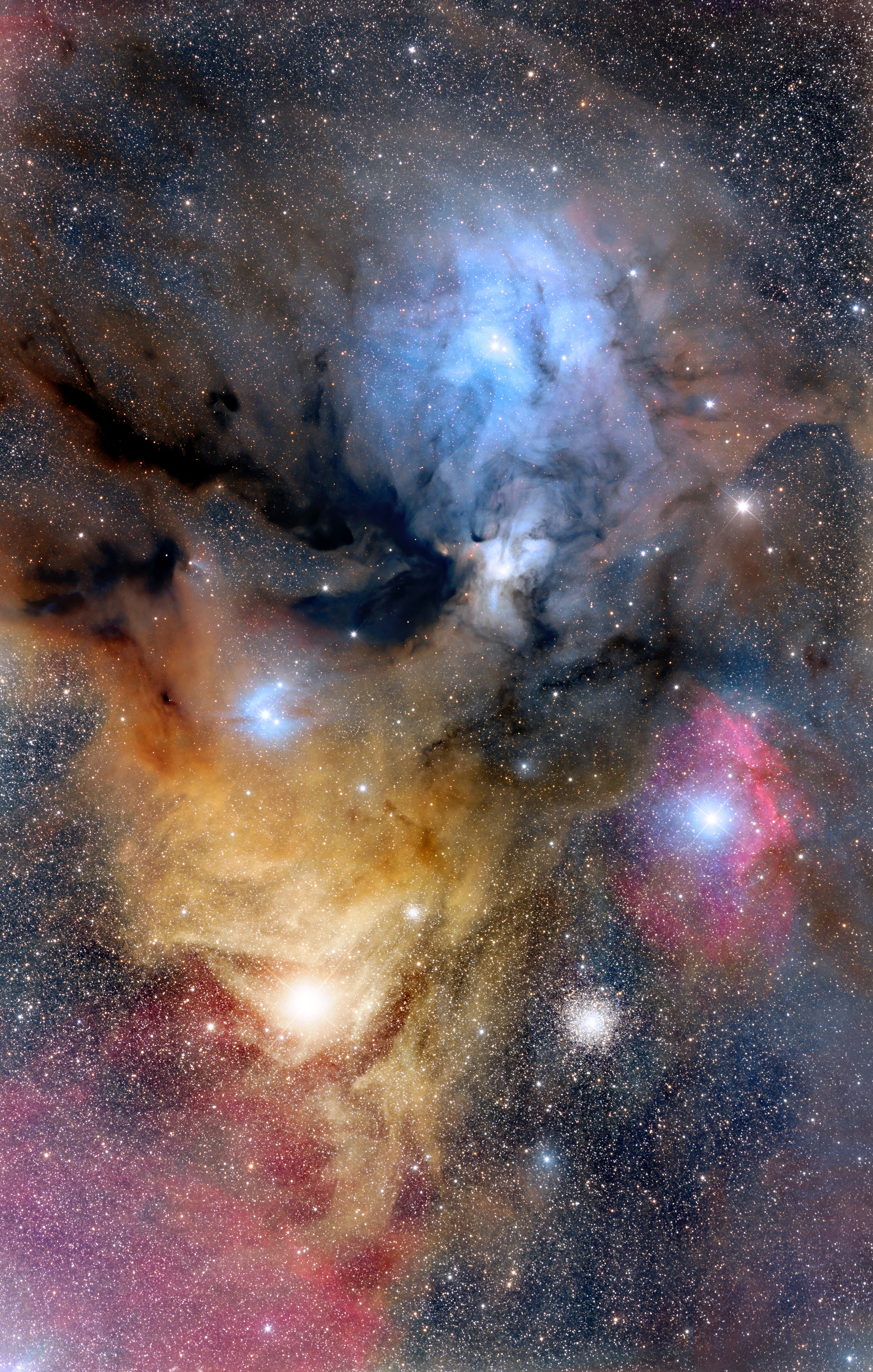
Rho Ophiuchi cloud complex (N is up): Antares is the bright star that looks yellow in this image, σ Scorpii is in the red nebula (Sh2-9), and the globular cluster M4 is in between. Rho Ophiuchi is the small group of stars in the blue nebulosity (IC 4604).

Rho Ophiuchi is the namesake of the Rho Ophiuchi cloud complex. It is a nebula of gas and dust, which the Rho Ophiuchi system is embedded in. It is one of the easiest star forming regions to observe, as it is one of the nearest, and it is visible from both hemispheres.

The interstellar extinction (A_{V}) of Rho Ophiuchi is measured to be 1.45 magnitudes, meaning the dust and gas in front of Rho Ophiuchi absorbs light from the system, making it appear 1.45 magnitudes dimmer than it would be if there were no dust or gas. Additionally, gas and dust also scatters more higher-frequency light, leaving the light appearing more reddish. The interstellar reddening (E_{B−V}) of Rho Ophiuchi has been measured to be 0.47 magnitudes.
