= Jyeshtha (nakshatra) =

18th lunar mansion in Hindu astronomy

Jyeshtha nakshatra is found in the Scorpius constellation

Jyeshtha (ज्येष्ठा, "the eldest" in Sanskrit) is the 18th nakshatra or lunar mansion in Hindu astronomy and Vedic astrology, associated with the stars Antares, σ Sco, and τ Sco in Scorpius. Jyeshtha is also the name of a goddess.

== Astrology ==
The symbol of Jyeshtha is a circular amulet, umbrella, or earring, and it is associated with Indra, chief of the gods. The lord of Jyeshtha is Budha (Mercury). Jyestha is termed in Malayalam as Thrikketta and in Tamil as Kēttai. The nakshtra is called honorifically as Trikkētta (Tiru + Kētta). Jyeshtha nakshatra corresponds to Antares.

The Ascendant/Lagna in Jyeshtha indicates a person with a sense of seniority and superiority, who is protective, responsible and a leader of their family. They are wise, profound, psychic, maybe with occult powers, and are courageous and inventive. Under the traditional Hindu principle of naming individuals according to their Ascendant/Lagna, the following Sanskrit syllables correspond with this Nakshatra, and would belong at the beginning of a first name:

- No
- Ya
- Yi
- Yu
