= IC 4592 =

Reflection nebula in the constellation of Scorpius

Reflection nebula
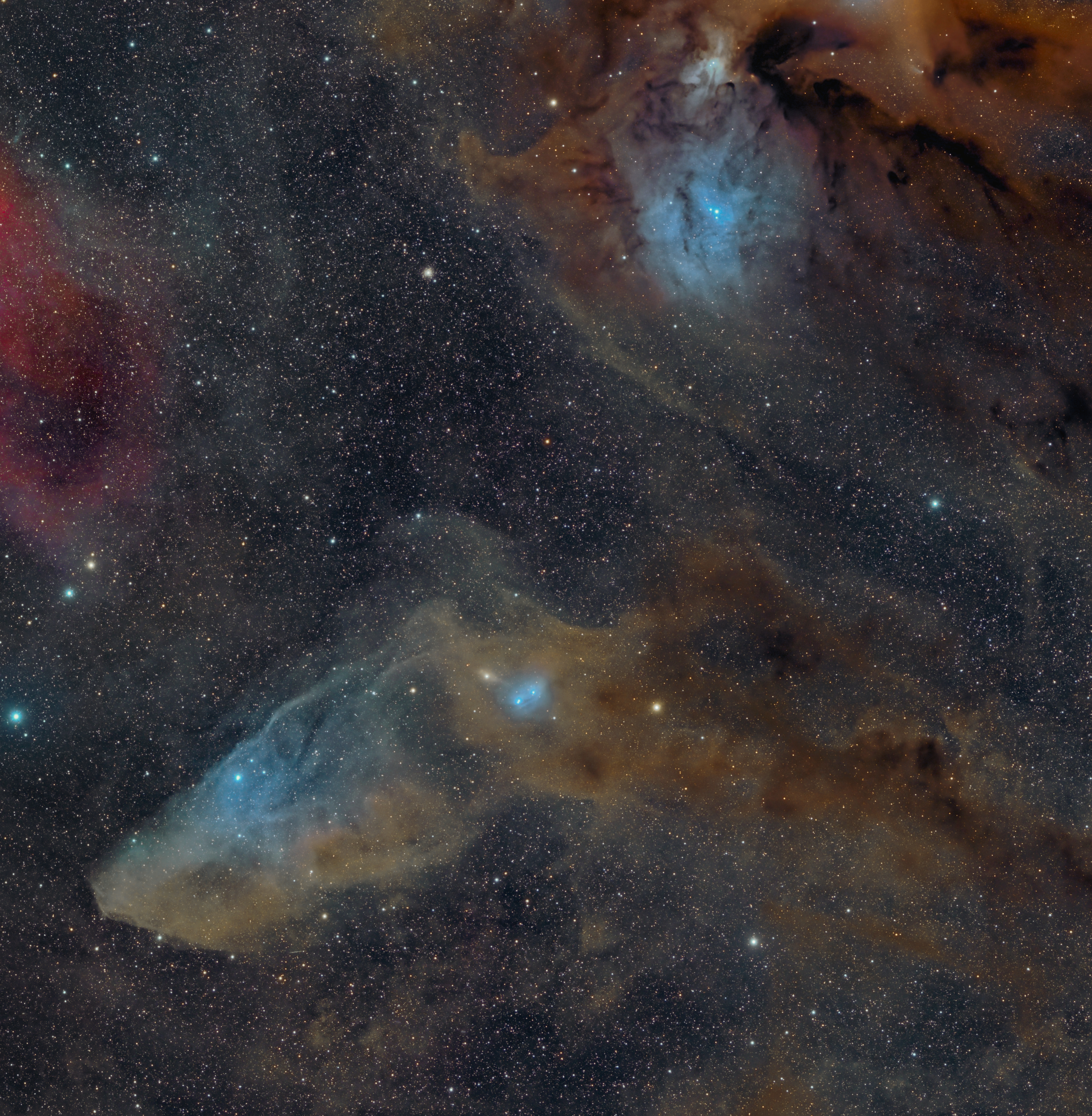

Observation data: J2000 epoch
- Right ascension: 16^{h} 11^{m} 58.6^{s}
- Declination: −19° 27′ 17″
- Distance: 400 ly
- Constellation: Scorpius

Physical characteristics
- Radius: 40 ly
- Designations: IC 4592, Blue Horsehead Nebula

IC 4592 (also known as the Blue Horsehead Nebula) is a reflection nebula in the constellation of Scorpius that is lit by Nu Scorpii.

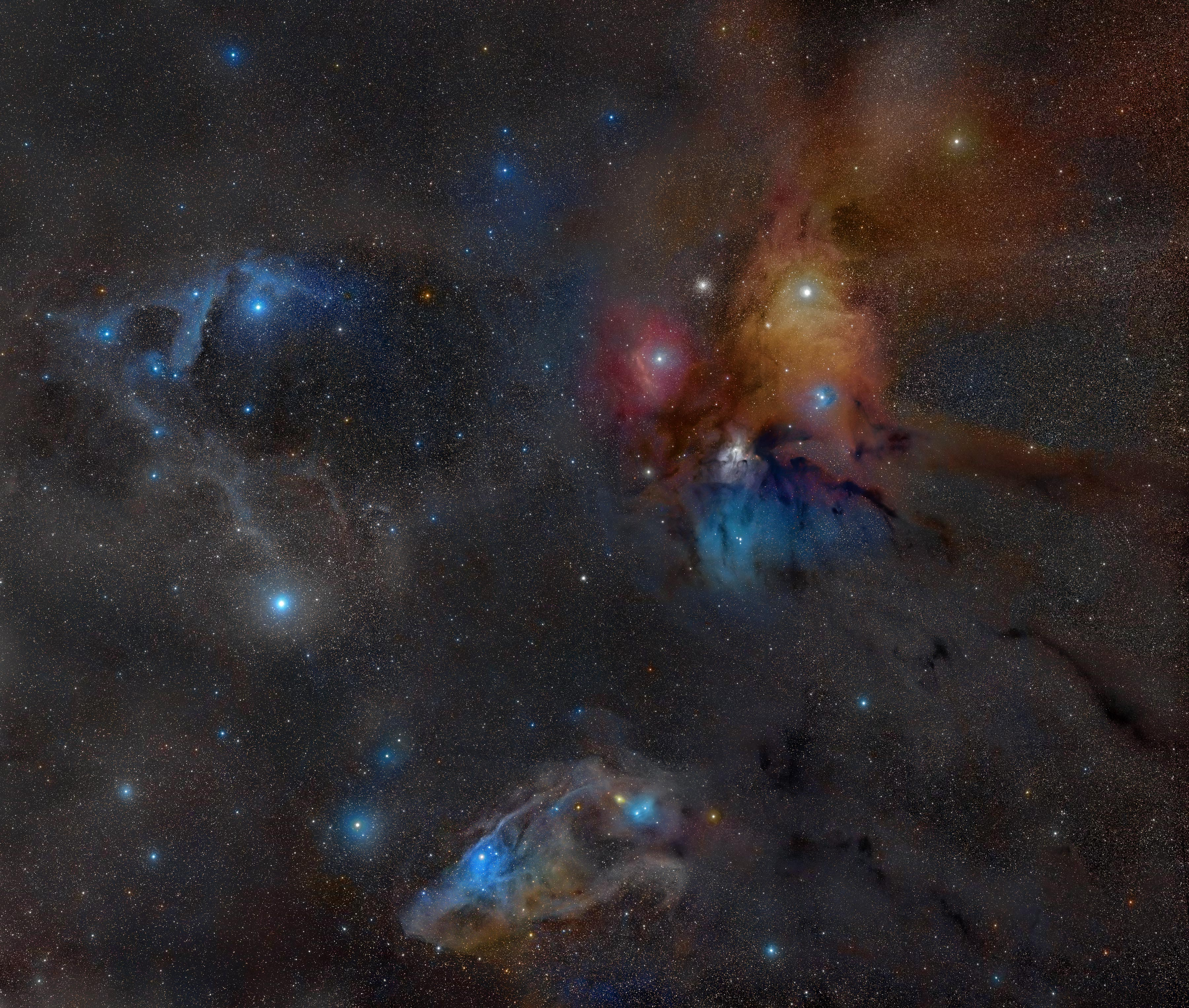
The distinct blue eyed (Nu Scorpii) Blue Horsehead Nebula can be seen in the lower part of this wide field image. The blue area at the back of the head is IC 4601. The large multicoloured area is the Rho Ophiuchi cloud complex, and the cloud in the top left corner is LBN 1093 and Sh2-1 with the bright star being Pi Scorpii and the yellowish cloud in the middle on the left being Sh2-7 with Dschubba at its center.
