= AR Cassiopeiae =

Star system in the constellation Cassiopeia

- Location of AR Cassiopeiae (circled in red)

Observation data Epoch J2000.0 Equinox ICRS
- Constellation: Cassiopeia
- AB
- Right ascension: 23^{h} 30^{m} 01.93946^{s}
- Declination: +58° 32′ 56.1120″
- Apparent magnitude (V): 4.883 (4.912 / 8.814)
- C
- Right ascension: 23^{h} 29^{m} 52.27982^{s}
- Declination: +58° 32′ 54.4530″
- Apparent magnitude (V): 7.23±0.01
- D
- Right ascension: 23^{h} 29^{m} 52.18197^{s}
- Declination: +58° 32′ 53.3423″
- Apparent magnitude (V): 9.00 - 9.05
- F
- Right ascension: 23^{h} 29^{m} 58.79260^{s}
- Declination: +58° 33′ 58.3908″
- Apparent magnitude (V): 11.01
- G
- Right ascension: 23^{h} 30^{m} 00.11097^{s}
- Declination: +58° 34′ 01.5021″
- Apparent magnitude (V): 11.11

Characteristics

AB
- Spectral type: B4 V + A6 V
- U−B color index: −0.62
- B−V color index: −0.12
- Variable type: Algol

CD
- Spectral type: B9 V
- U−B color index: −0.14
- B−V color index: +0.01

FG
- Evolutionary stage: main sequence
- Spectral type: F7 IV + F9 V

Astrometry
Radial velocity (R_{v})	−15.9±0.9 km/s
Proper motion (μ)	RA: 17.90 mas/yr Dec.: 4.15 mas/yr
Parallax (π)	5.25±0.52 mas
Distance	662.5 ± 13.8 ly (203.13±4.24 pc)

Aa
Absolute magnitude (M_{V})	−1.87±0.13
Absolute bolometric magnitude (M_{bol})	−3.56±0.13

Ab
Absolute magnitude (M_{V})	2.20±0.11
Absolute bolometric magnitude (M_{bol})	2.18±0.11

C
Proper motion (μ)	RA: 18.797±0.024 mas/yr Dec.: 1.953±0.024 mas/yr
Parallax (π)	4.7329±0.0236 mas
Distance	685.7 ± 1.2 ly (210.25±0.36 pc)

D
Proper motion (μ)	RA: 20.435±0.059 mas/yr Dec.: 1.802±0.051 mas/yr
Parallax (π)	4.6548±0.0362 mas
Distance	698.1 ± 1.0 ly (214.03±0.32 pc)

F
Radial velocity (R_{v})	−12.86±1.18 km/s
Proper motion (μ)	RA: 20.240±0.011 mas/yr Dec.: 1.884±0.011 mas/yr
Parallax (π)	4.7301±0.0109 mas
Distance	685.939 ± 0.033 ly (210.31±0.01 pc)

G
Radial velocity (R_{v})	−13.20±1.65 km/s
Proper motion (μ)	RA: 20.452±0.016 mas/yr Dec.: 2.050±0.014 mas/yr
Parallax (π)	4.7539±0.0138 mas
Distance	682.45 ± 0.78 ly (209.24±0.24 pc)

Orbit
Primary	Aa
Name	Ab
Period (P)	6.0663170 d
Eccentricity (e)	0.240
Inclination (i)	85.34±0.50°
Periastron epoch (T)	JD 2436847.9404±0.0055
Argument of periastron (ω) (secondary)	41.82±0.47°
Semi-amplitude (K_{1}) (primary)	55.5 km/s

Details

Aa
Mass	5.90±0.20 M_{☉}
Radius	5.05±0.06 R_{☉}
Surface gravity (log g)	3.80±0.02 cgs
Temperature	17,200±500 K
Rotational velocity (v sin i)	129.3 km/s

Ab
Mass	1.86±0.06 M_{☉}
Radius	1.60±0.03 R_{☉}
Surface gravity (log g)	4.30±0.02 cgs
Temperature	8,150±200 K

B
Mass	1.43 M_{☉}

C
Mass	3.125±0.046 M_{☉}
Radius	2.415+0.053 −0.054 R_{☉}
Luminosity	112.2±2.2 L_{☉}
Surface gravity (log g)	4.01 cgs
Temperature	12083±8 K
Metallicity [Fe/H]	-1.49 dex

D
Mass	1.28 M_{☉}
Temperature	5,095 K

F
Mass	1.139±0.040 M_{☉}
Radius	1.139±0.023 R_{☉}
Luminosity	1.666+0.011 −0.010 L_{☉}
Surface gravity (log g)	4.30 cgs
Temperature	6098+27 −26 K
Metallicity [Fe/H]	-0.35 dex
Age	2.04 Gyr

G
Mass	1.044+0.040 −0.041 M_{☉}
Radius	1.144±0.012 R_{☉}
Luminosity	1.493+0.014 −0.015 L_{☉}
Surface gravity (log g)	4.32 cgs
Temperature	5934±67 K
Metallicity [Fe/H]	-0.32 dex
Age	5.82 Gyr

Other designations
- ADS 16795, CCDM J23300+5833, WDS J23300+5833
- AR Cassiopeiae (AB): 1H. Cas, AR Cas, AG+58 1562, BD+57°2748, HD 221253, HIP 115990, HR 8926, SAO 35478, GSC 04011-01296, 2MASS J23300196+5832561, Gaia DR3 2011150635728091648
- HD 221237 (CD): BD+57°2747, HD 221237, SAO 35476, 2MASS J23295227+5832542
- FG: UCAC4 743-089692

Database references
SIMBAD	AR Cas (AB)
- CD
- C
- D
- F
- G

AR Cassiopeiae (AR Cas) is a variable star in the constellation of Cassiopeia. It is thought to be a member of a septuple star system, one of only two known star systems with a multiplicity of 7, the other being Nu Scorpii.

== Nomenclature ==
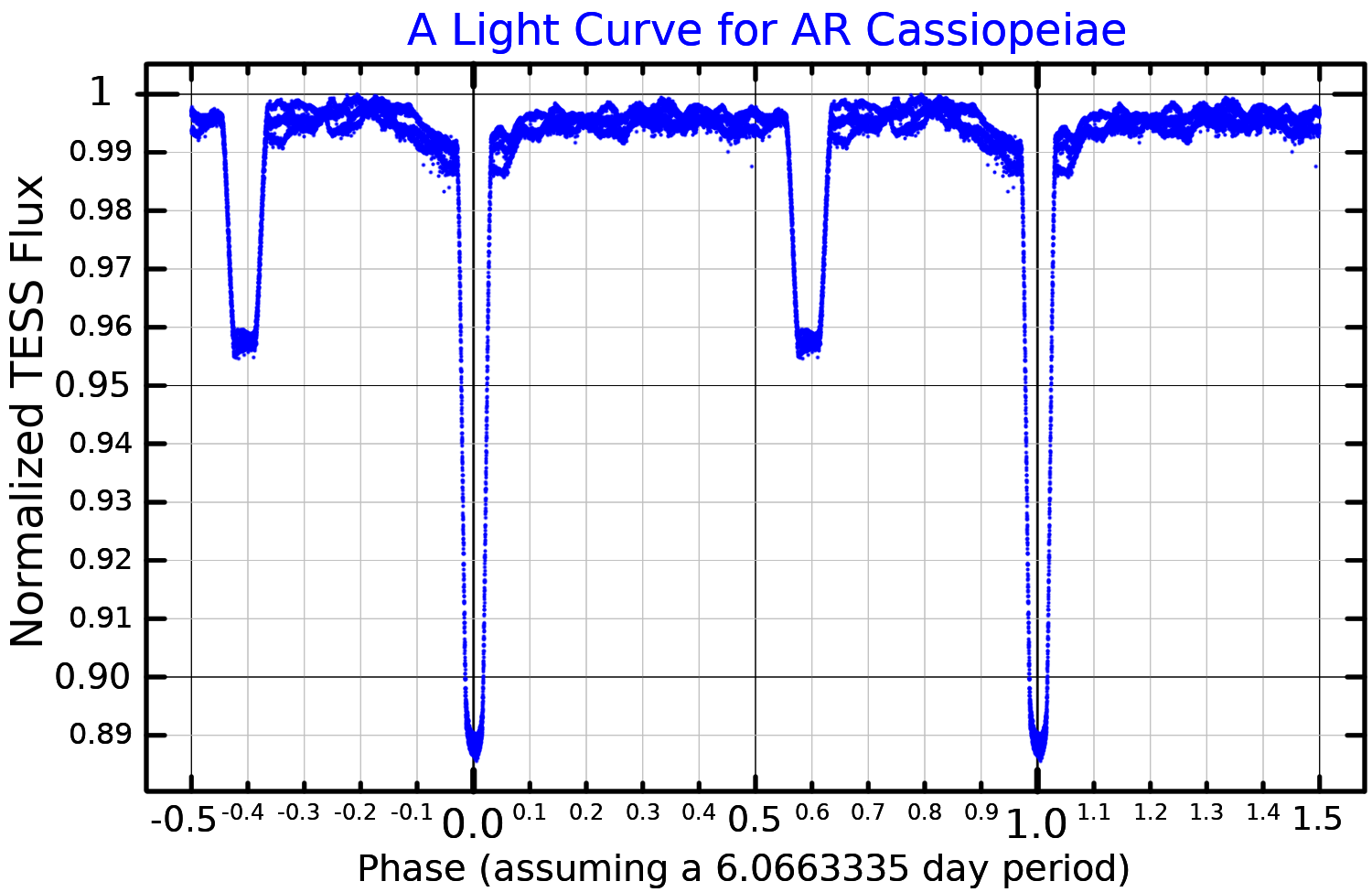
A light curve for AR Cassiopeiae, plotted from TESS data

The multiple star system as a whole has the designations ADS 16795, CCDM J23300+5833, and WDS J23300+5833AB in the Aitken Double Star Catalogue, the Catalogue of Components of Double and Multiple Stars, and the Washington Double Star Catalog respectively.

AR Cassiopeiae has been referred to as IH Cas in some literature, looking similar to a variable star designation although not a valid one since the second letter of a variable star designation is always equal to the first or occurs later in the alphabet. The origin of the designation "IH Cassiopeiae" is from the 17th century catalogue and constellation map by Johannes Hevelius, which was kept in use due to the lack of a Flamsteed designation or Bayer designation for the star. It was the first star in Cassiopeia that Flamsteed's edition of Hevelius catalogued, thus "1 Hev. Cas" or "1 H. Cas" (similar to Gould designations), which becomes IH Cas through corruption.

== Properties ==
The primary star system, AR Cassiopeiae, is a triple. AR Cassiopeiae B is located 0.800″ away from AR Cassiopeiae A.

In 1921, Joel Stebbins announced that observations from 1917 through 1921 had shown that the star is an eclipsing binary. AR Cassiopeiae A is an Algol-type eclipsing binary with an orbital period of about 6.07 days. Its primary is a B-type main-sequence star, and the secondary an A-type main-sequence star. The secondary star may be an Am star.

Farther out are two other stars, designated components C and D. They are 76.1″, or about 1.27′, away from the central system. Their combined spectrum matches that of another B-type main-sequence star. This pair is also designated HD 221237. 67.2″ (1.12′) away from AR Cassiopeiae is another pair of stars, F and G, both F-type stars.

All these stars are known to be common proper motion companions. However, the star listed as component E and H in most multiple star catalogues is an unrelated background star.

== Visual companions ==
There are three visual companions to AR Cassiopeiae; none of the three are thought to be physically associated with AR Cassiopeiae.

Multiple/double star designation: WDS 23300+5833
Component	Primary	Right ascension (α) Equinox J2000.0	Declination (δ) Equinox J2000.0	Epoch of observed separation	Angular distance from primary	Position angle (relative to primary)	Apparent magnitude (V)	Database reference
E	A	23^{h} 29^{m} 58.793^{s}	+58° 33′ 58.39″	2012	39.9″	117°	11.28	SIMBAD
H	C	23^{h} 29^{m} 50.924^{s}	+58° 33′ 19.20″	2015	26.9″	337°	13.0	SIMBAD
I	A	23^{h} 29^{m} 48.436^{s}	+58° 29′ 30.86″	2016	234″	208°	9.87	SIMBAD
