= CoRoT-1b =

Extrasolar planet orbiting CoRoT-1

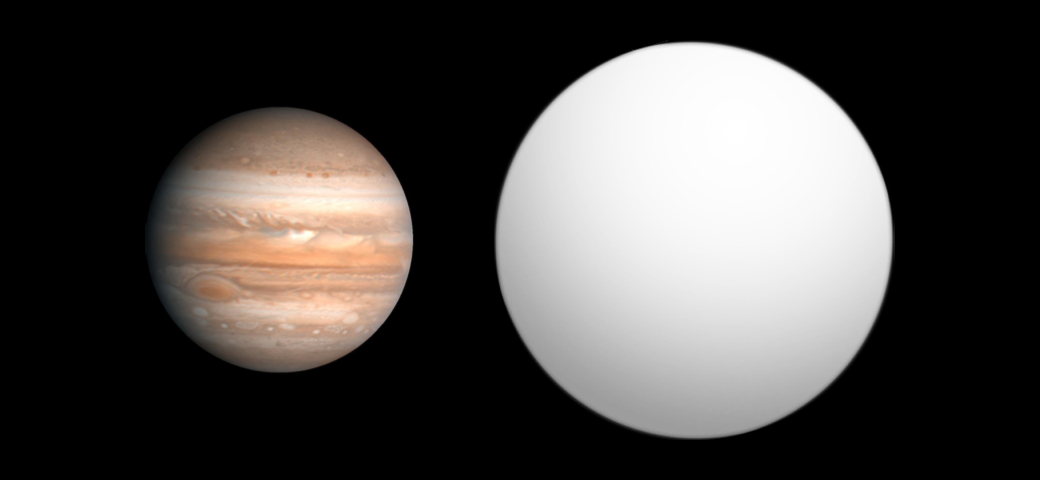
- Size comparison of CoRoT-1b with Jupiter.

Discovery
- Discovered by: Barge et al.
- Discovery site: France
- Discovery date: 3 May 2007
- Detection method: Transit

Orbital characteristics
- Semi-major axis: 0.02752+0.00022 −0.00023 AU
- Eccentricity: <0.036
- Orbital period (sidereal): 1.5089682±0.0000005 d
- Inclination: 85.10±0.50
- Star: CoRoT-1

Physical characteristics
- Mean radius: 1.715±0.030 R_{J}
- Mass: 1.23±0.10 M_{J}
- Mean density: 0.380 ± 0.050 g/cm^{3}
- Surface gravity: 11.5 m/s^{2} (38 ft/s^{2})
- Temperature: 1,898±50

CoRoT-1b (previously named CoRoT-Exo-1b) is a transiting extrasolar planet approximately 2,630 light-years away in the constellation of Monoceros. The planet was discovered orbiting the yellow dwarf star CoRoT-1 in May 2007. The planet was the first discovery by the French-led CoRoT Mission.

== Discovery ==
CoRoT-1b was identified as the best planetary candidate from the CoRoT spacecraft initial run from February 6 to April 2, 2007. Follow-up photometry with the Wise Observatorys 1.0 m telescope and at the Canada–France–Hawaii Telescope eliminated many of the possible false positives for the transit signal. 9 radial velocity measurements of CoRoT-1 were made at Haute-Provence Observatory in March–April and October 2007 with the SOPHIE échelle spectrograph. The radial velocity data matched the CoRoT light curve and supported the planetary nature of CoRoT-1b and eliminated other possibilities such as background stars, grazing eclipsing binaries, or a triple system.

The discovery was publicly announced on May 3, 2007 and submitted for publication on January 4, 2008.

== Characteristics ==
The planet is a large hot Jupiter, about 1.49 times the radius of Jupiter and approximately 1.03 times as massive, based on ground observations of the star. Its large size is due to its low density combined with the intense heating of its parent star causing the outer layers of the atmosphere to bloat.

== Observation of phases ==
In May 2009 CoRoT-1b became the first extrasolar planet for which optical (as opposed to infrared) observations of phases were reported. These observations suggest that there is not significant heat transfer between the (tidally locked) night and day sides of the planet.

== See also ==
- 51 Pegasi b
- CoRoT-2b
- TrES-1
