= Nu Scorpii =

Multiple star system in the constellation Scorpius

ν Scorpii
- Location of ν Sco (circled)

Observation data Epoch J2000 Equinox ICRS
- Constellation: Scorpius
- ν Sco A
- Right ascension: 16^{h} 11^{m} 59.740^{s}
- Declination: −19° 27′ 38.33″
- Apparent magnitude (V): 4.349
- ν Sco B
- Right ascension: 16^{h} 11^{m} 59.746^{s}
- Declination: −19° 27′ 36.94″
- Apparent magnitude (V): 6.60
- ν Sco C
- Right ascension: 16^{h} 11^{m} 58.541^{s}
- Declination: −19° 27′ 00.63″
- Apparent magnitude (V): 6.60
- ν Sco D
- Right ascension: 16^{h} 11^{m} 58.541^{s}
- Declination: −19° 27′ 00.63″
- Apparent magnitude (V): 7.23

Characteristics

ν Sco AB
- Spectral type: B3V (A)
- U−B color index: −0.63
- B−V color index: +0.05

ν Sco CD
- Spectral type: B8V + B9VpSi
- U−B color index: −0.37
- B−V color index: +0.13

Astrometry

ν Sco AB
Radial velocity (R_{v})	+2.4±5 km/s
Proper motion (μ)	RA: −7.65 mas/yr Dec.: −23.71 mas/yr
Parallax (π)	6.88±0.76 mas
Distance	approx. 470 ly (approx. 150 pc)
Absolute magnitude (M_{V})	−1.78

ν Sco C
Radial velocity (R_{v})	−9.72±0.64 km/s
Proper motion (μ)	RA: −11.853 mas/yr Dec.: −24.920 mas/yr
Parallax (π)	7.2608±0.0348 mas
Distance	449 ± 2 ly (137.7 ± 0.7 pc)
Absolute magnitude (M_{V})	+0.754

ν Sco D
Radial velocity (R_{v})	−3.0 km/s
Proper motion (μ)	RA: −7.099 mas/yr Dec.: −22.792 mas/yr
Parallax (π)	7.1732±0.01399 mas
Distance	454.7 ± 0.9 ly (139.4 ± 0.3 pc)

Orbit
Primary	ν Sco Aa
Name	ν Sco Ab
Period (P)	5.55206±0.00003 d
Eccentricity (e)	0.11±0.05
Periastron epoch (T)	2442185.555±0.349
Argument of periastron (ω) (secondary)	267±23°
Semi-amplitude (K_{1}) (primary)	26.5±1.3 km/s

Orbit
Primary	ν Sco Aab
Name	ν Sco Ac
Period (P)	10.0611 yr
Semi-major axis (a)	0.073 AU
Eccentricity (e)	0.92
Inclination (i)	89.7°
Longitude of the node (Ω)	346.4°
Periastron epoch (T)	2014.987
Argument of periastron (ω) (secondary)	118.9°

Orbit
Primary	ν Sco A
Name	ν Sco B
Period (P)	500 yr
Semi-major axis (a)	1.126 AU
Eccentricity (e)	0.5
Inclination (i)	91.2°
Longitude of the node (Ω)	0.9°
Periastron epoch (T)	1672
Argument of periastron (ω) (secondary)	125.0°

Details

Aa
Mass	5.1+0.3 −0.2 M_{☉}
Radius	6.52+0.24 −0.23 R_{☉}
Luminosity	1,260+250 −160 L_{☉}
Surface gravity (log g)	3.48±0.04 cgs
Temperature	13,400+900 −550 K
Metallicity [Fe/H]	0.58 dex

Ab
Mass	2.28 M_{☉}

Ac
Mass	2.46 M_{☉}

B
Mass	3.79 M_{☉}

C
Mass	3.473+0.001 −0.002 M_{☉}
Radius	2.378±0.010 R_{☉}
Luminosity	154+7 −2 L_{☉}
Surface gravity (log g)	4.247±0.009 cgs
Temperature	13,251+6 −4 K
Metallicity [Fe/H]	0.396 ± 0.007 dex

Da
Mass	1.96 M_{☉}

Other designations
- Jabbah, ν Sco, 14 Sco, ADS 9951, CCDM J16120-1928
- ν Sco AB: BD−19°4333, HD 145502, HIP 79374, HR 6027, SAO 159764
- ν Sco CD: BD−19°4332, HD 145501, HR 6026, SAO 159763

Database references
SIMBAD	ν Sco
- ν Sco A
- ν Sco B
- ν Sco C
- ν Sco D

Nu Scorpii (ν Scorpii, abbreviated Nu Sco, ν Sco) is a multiple star system in the constellation of Scorpius. It is most likely a septuple star system, consisting of two close groups (designated Nu Scorpii AB and CD) that are separated by 41 arcseconds. Based on parallax measurements, it is approximately 470 light-years from the Sun.

The component Nu Scorpii Aa is formally named Jabbah /ˈdʒæbə/.

== Location ==
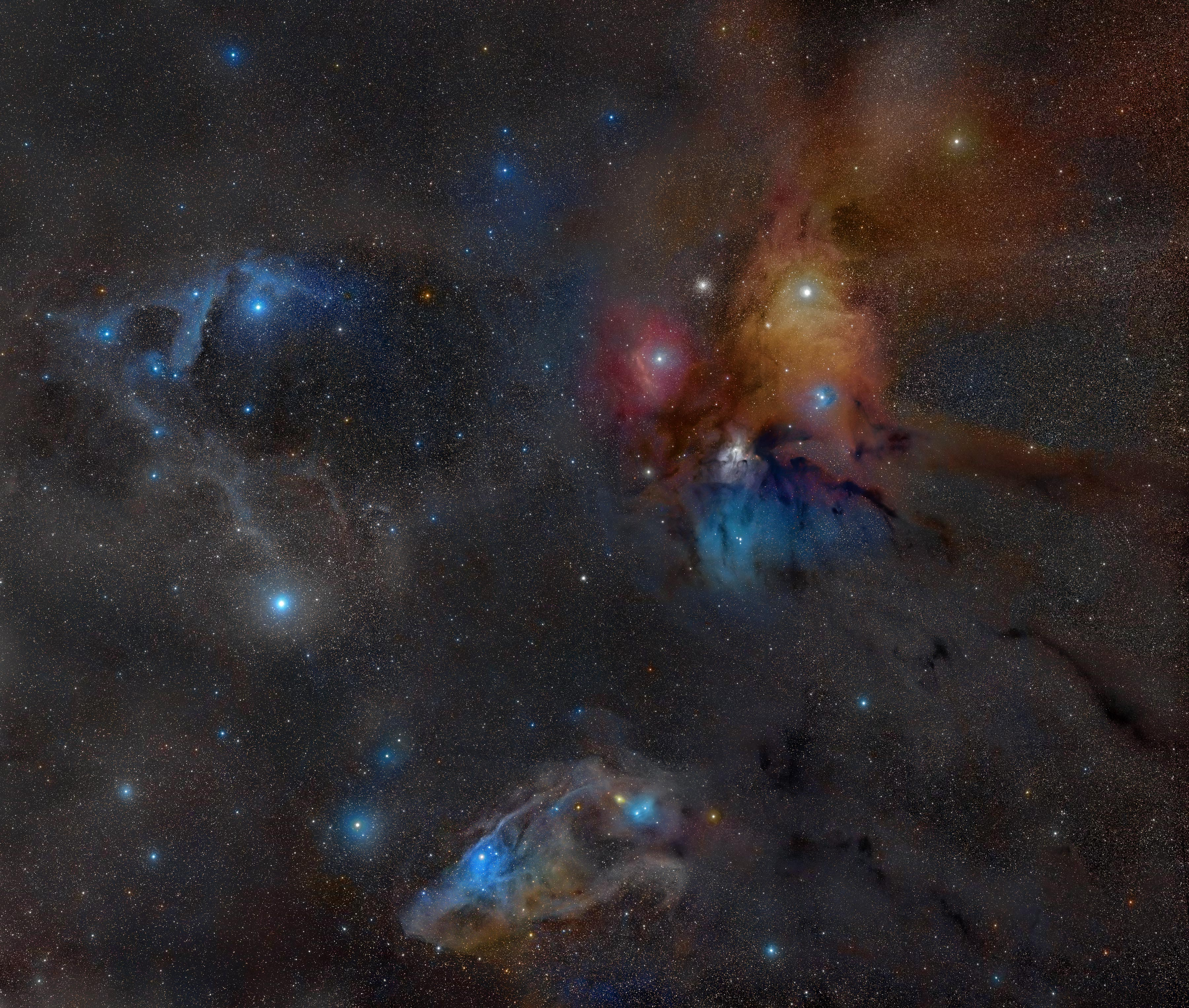
The ρ Ophiuchi region. ν is embedded in the Blue Horsehead nebula near the bottom of the frame (north is down).

Nu Scorpii is the system that causes the reflection nebula cataloged as IC 4592 and known as the Blue Horsehead nebula. Reflection nebulae are actually made up of very fine dust that normally appears dark but can look quite blue when reflecting the light of energetic nearby stars.

Since it is near the ecliptic, Nu Scorpii can be occulted by the Moon and, very rarely, by planets. Mercury occulted it on 14 December 1821, but will not occult it again until 2 December 2031. The last occultation by Venus took place on 27 December 1852 and the next will take place on 30 December 2095. On 29 July 1808 there was an occultation by Neptune.

== Nomenclature ==
ν Scorpii (Latinised to Nu Scorpii) is the system's Bayer designation. The designations of its two constituent groups as Nu Scorpii AB and CD; of the component Nu Scorpii Aa, and of other components similarly lettered, derive from the convention used by the Washington Multiplicity Catalog (WMC) for multiple star systems, and adopted by the International Astronomical Union (IAU).

Constellation of Scorpius surrounding Jabbah, seen in infrared by NASA's WISE telescope

Nu Scorpii bore the traditional name Jabbah, possibly from the Arabic Iklīl al Jabhah (إكليل الجبهة 'the crown of the forehead'). In 2016, the IAU organized a Working Group on Star Names (WGSN) to catalog and standardize proper names for stars. The WGSN decided to attribute proper names to individual stars rather than entire multiple systems. It approved the name Jabbah for the component Nu Scorpii Aa on 30 June 2017 and it is now so included in the List of IAU-approved Star Names.

In Chinese astronomy, Nu Scorpii is called 鍵閉, Pinyin: Jiànbì, meaning Door Bolt, because it is marking itself and standing alone in the Door Bolt asterism, Room mansion (see : Chinese constellations). 鍵閉 (Jiànbì), westernized into Keen Pi, but that name (meaning "the Two Parts of a Lock") was ascribed to the pair Lambda Scorpii (Shaula) and Upsilon Scorpii (Lesath) by R.H. Allen.

== Multiplicity ==
Aa
Period = 5.55d a = 1.06 mas
Ab
Period = 5.7y a = 63 mas
Ac
1.3″ separation
B
41.1″ separation
C
2″ separation
Da
Orbit unknown
Db

Hierarchy of orbits in the ν Scorpii system

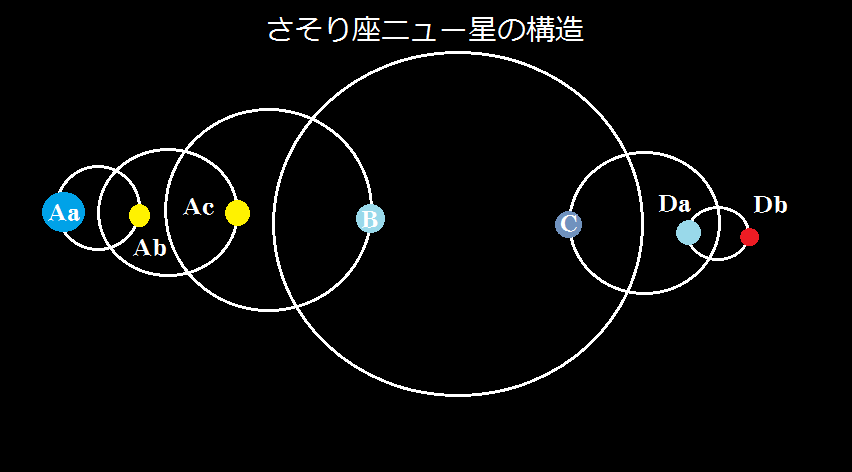
Schematic of the Nu Scorpii system (not to scale)

Nu Scorpii is a septuple star system. It is one of only two such known systems, the other being AR Cassiopeiae. Higher-multiplicity star systems are uncommon because they are less stable than their simpler counterparts, and often decay into smaller systems.

Nu Scorpii is split into two groups, Nu Scorpii AB and Nu Scorpii CD. Nu Scorpii CD is located 41 arcseconds away from Nu Scorpii A, and is also known as HR 6026. Nu Scorpii AB and CD cannot be resolved using the naked eye, but can be resolved using a telescope.

== Visibility ==
The system as a whole has an apparent magnitude of around +4, meaning it can be seen with the naked eye under good conditions.

=== Nu Scorpii A ===
Nu Scorpii A is the brightest member of the system. It has an apparent magnitude from 4.35, meaning that it can be seen with the naked eye.

Nu Scorpii A is itself a triple star system. The inner pair is known as Nu Scorpii Aab, and it is a single-lined spectroscopic binary. Its components cannot be resolved but the stars' movements cause periodic Doppler shifts in their spectra. "Single-lined" means that light from only one of the stars can be detected. The pair has an orbital period of 5.5521 days and an eccentricity of 0.11, and an estimated separation of about 1.057 milliarcseconds. The brighter component, Nu Scorpii Aa, has a spectral type of B3V implying a B-type main sequence star. The fainter component, Nu Scorpii Ab, is thought to have an apparent magnitude of 6.90.

The outer star, Nu Scorpii Ac, is 63 milliarcseconds away from the inner pair and it has an apparent magnitude of 6.62.

=== Nu Scorpii B ===
Nu Scorpii B is part of the Nu Scorpii AB sub-system and orbits the three Nu Scorpii A stars. Nu Scorpii A and B are separated by 1.305 arcseconds; this translates to an orbital period of over 452 years, so no orbital motion has been detected. It has an apparent magnitude of 5.40, but its spectral type is unknown.

=== Nu Scorpii CD ===
Nu Scorpii CD is also a triple star system. The primary component of the system, Nu Scorpii C, is a late B-type main sequence star with a spectral type of B8V. With an apparent magnitude of 6.90, it outshines its fainter companion, Nu Scorpii D, which only has an apparent magnitude of 7.39. The two are separated by about 2 arcseconds.

Nu Scorpii D, with an apparent magnitude of 7.39, is the faintest component of the Nu Scorpii system and has a spectral class of B9V. It is one of a class of chemically peculiar stars known as Ap/Bp stars; in particular, it has strong silicon emission lines. It too is likely also another spectroscopic binary: Nu Scorpii Da is another late B star, similar to Nu Scorpii C, but very little is known about Nu Scorpii Db.
