= Sh 2-7 =

Emission nebula in Scorpius

Emission nebula

Observation data: epoch
- Right ascension: 16h 0m 36s
- Declination: -22d 57m
- Distance: 650 ly
- Apparent magnitude (V): 18.6
- Apparent dimensions (V): 240' x 240'
- Constellation: Scorpius
- Designations: LBN 1099

Sh 2-7 is an emission nebula around the star Delta Scorpii in the constellation Scorpius. It lies next to a large reflection nebula, Sh 2-1.

According to the paper Interstellar magnetic cannon targeting the Galactic halo. A young bubble at the origin of the Ophiuchus and Lupus molecular complexes, the HII region Sh 2-7 may be acting as a faraday screen, altering the polarization of the GCS.
