= Sh 2-9 =

HII Region

Emission nebula
- H II region
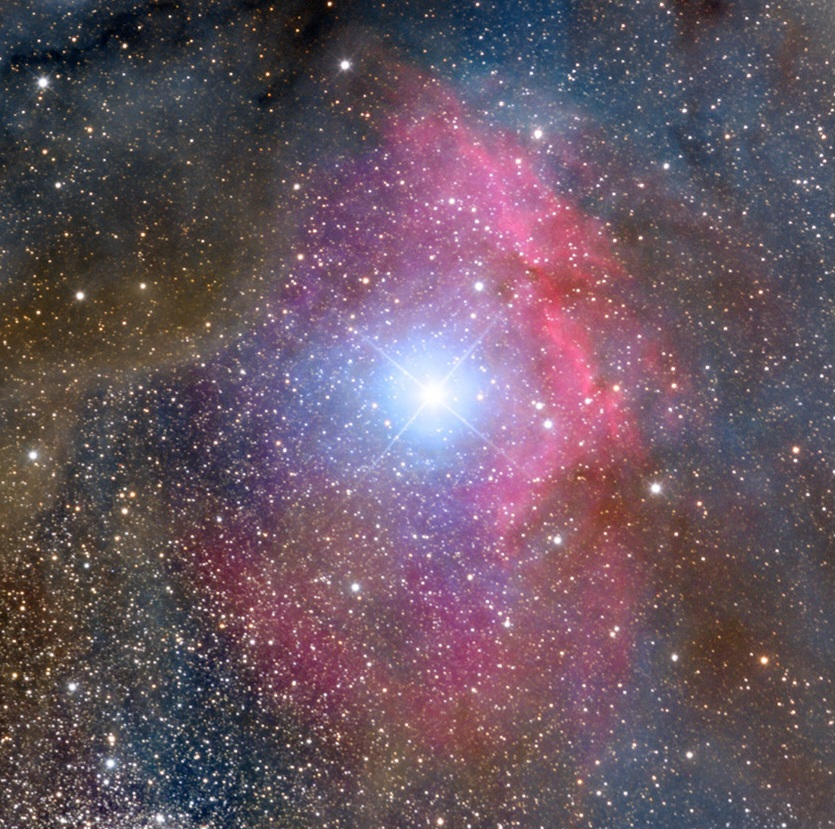
- Image of Sh 2-9 with star Sigma Scorpii at the center

Observation data: J2000.0 epoch
- Right ascension: 16h 21m 11.31s
- Declination: -25d 35m 34.05
- Distance: 568 ly (174 pc)
- Apparent magnitude (V): 2.89
- Constellation: Scorpius
- Designations: Gum 65, LBN 1101, HD 147165, IRAS 16181-2528

Sh 2-9, also known as Gum 65, is combination emission and reflection nebula in the constellation Scorpius, surrounding the multiple star system Sigma Scorpii. Sigma Scorpii is 1° to the northwest of Messier 4, and the nebula can be easily seen with small telescopes.

Sharpless 9 is a red emission nebula that surrounds the star Sigma Scorpii. It is thought the star Sigma Scorpii, a variable giant star, is ionizing this region. It is also recorded as reflection nebula C130.

This region is noted as both an emission and reflection nebula, although sometimes only one aspect is noted.

The magnitude 1.1 Antares is 2° to the southeast of this nebula.

One of strongest 2.3 GHz sources in the region coincides with Sharpless 9.

There is a radio source on the edge, and it has been proposed that this is because there is a collision between this nebula and the dark nebula Kh 527.

== Catalogs ==
Examples:

- Sharpless 9
- Gum 65
- Cederblad 140
