= CoRoT-1 =

Yellow dwarf star in the constellation Monoceros

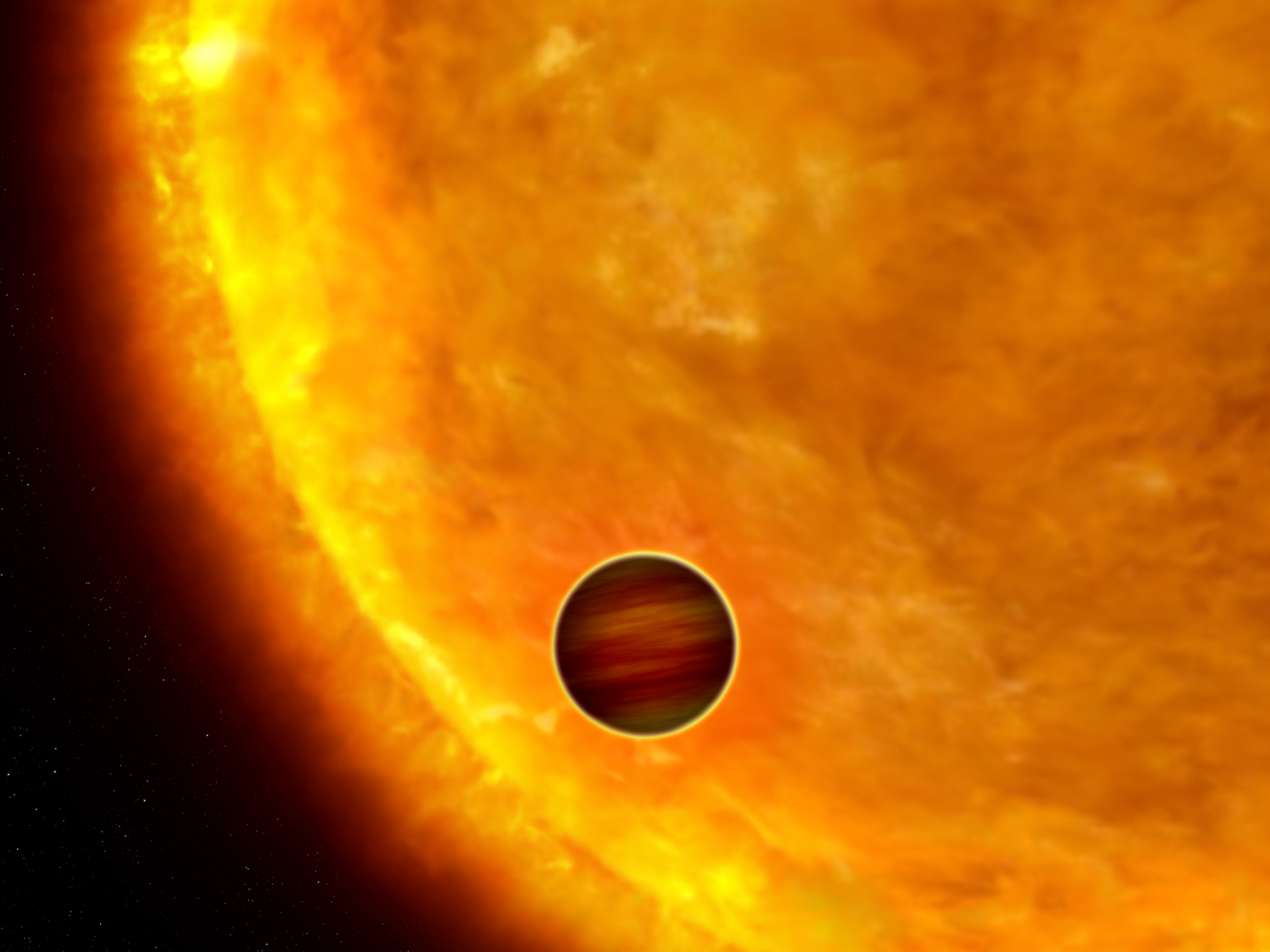
- An artist's depiction of CoRoT-1 and its "hot Jupiter" exoplanet

Observation data Epoch J2000.0 Equinox ICRS
- Constellation: Monoceros
- Right ascension: 06^{h} 48^{m} 19.1724^{s}
- Declination: −03° 06′ 07.711″
- Apparent magnitude (V): 13.6

Characteristics
- Evolutionary stage: main sequence
- Spectral type: G0V
- Apparent magnitude (V): ~13.6
- Apparent magnitude (I): 12.88 ±0.04
- Apparent magnitude (J): 12.462 ±0.029
- Apparent magnitude (H): 12.218 ±0.026
- Apparent magnitude (K): 12.149 ±0.027
- Variable type: Pulsating variable

Astrometry
Proper motion (μ)	RA: −5.978(16) mas/yr Dec.: 0.570(14) mas/yr
Parallax (π)	1.3000±0.0167 mas
Distance	2,510 ± 30 ly (769 ± 10 pc)

Details
Mass	1.3 M_{☉}
Radius	1.3 R_{☉}
Luminosity	2.4 L_{☉}
Surface gravity (log g)	4.32 cgs
Temperature	6,355 K
Metallicity	0.03
Rotational velocity (v sin i)	4.70 km/s
Age	1.0 – 6.5 years

Other designations
- GSC 04804-02268, DENIS-P J064819.1-030607, 2MASS J06481917-0306077, USNO-B1.0 0868-00112004, CoRoT-Exo-1, GSC2 S1002112279, UCAC2 30655657

Database references
SIMBAD	data

CoRoT-1 is a yellow dwarf main sequence star similar to the Sun. The star is located approximately 2,510 light-years away in the constellation of Monoceros. The apparent magnitude of this star is 13.6, which means it is not visible to the naked eye; however, it can be seen through a medium-sized amateur telescope on a clear, dark night. The first exoplanet discovered in the course of the CoRoT mission orbits this star; it is considered to be a "hot Jupiter", and is approximately as massive as the planet Jupiter itself.

== Nomenclature ==
The designation "CoRoT" is a result of its observation by the French-directed Convection, Rotation, and Planetary Transits mission, which was launched in late December 2006 with one goal involving the search for exoplanets by measuring the varying brightness of candidate stars when transited by any present exoplanets; CoRoT's second goal pertains to the study of the interiors of stars, which is done by analyzing the characteristics and behavior of light released from the star. The numerical designation was assigned because the first exoplanet discovered by the CoRoT telescope was found in orbit of this star. CoRoT-1 does not have a common or colloquial name like that of Sirius or Procyon.

== Characteristics ==
CoRoT-1 is a G-type star, meaning the light it emits is similar to that of the Sun's. Likewise, the star is of nearly the same temperature and mass of the Sun. At an apparent magnitude of approximately +13.6, doubly dimmer than the dimmest star visible with the naked eye, CoRoT-1 cannot be seen from Earth without magnification apparatus.

A search for a binary companion star using Lucky imaging observations with the Danish 1.54 m telescope at La Silla Observatory in Chile did not find any candidate companion stars.

=== Variability ===
When CoRoT-1 was observed by the CoRoT telescope over a continuous period of sixty days since the preliminary results release on 23 May 2007, the star's light exhibited patterns identical to pulsating variable stars with characteristics similar to that of the Sun.

== Planetary system ==
The transit method, which can be documented when planets eclipse their star in respect to Earth's position, was used to discover CoRoT-1b.

This star is home to the transiting exoplanet CoRot-1b, the first exoplanet discovered by the CoRoT Mission spacecraft. The planet, which is similar to that of the planet Jupiter's in terms of mass, orbits approximately .02 AU away from its parent star. In comparison, the planet Mercury orbits at approximately .387 AU from the Sun. CoRoT-1b is presumed to be tidally locked to its star.

The planet was the first to be sighted optically rather than through infrared. Unlike other "hot Jupiters," this occurrence seems to imply that the heat transfer between the hemisphere of the planet facing the star and the hemisphere facing away is not significant.

The CoRoT-1 planetary system
Companion (in order from star)	Mass	Semimajor axis (AU)	Orbital period (days)	Eccentricity	Inclination (°)	Radius
b	1.23±0.10 M_{J}	0.02752+0.00022 −0.00023	1.5089682±0.0000005	<0.036	85.10±0.50	1.715±0.030 R_{J}

== See also ==
- Lists of exoplanets
