= Tau Scorpii =

Star in the constellation of Scorpius

- Location of τ Scorpii (circled)

Observation data Epoch J2000 Equinox ICRS
- Constellation: Scorpius
- Right ascension: 16^{h} 35^{m} 52.95285^{s}
- Declination: −28° 12′ 57.6615″
- Apparent magnitude (V): +2.82

Characteristics
- Evolutionary stage: main sequence
- Spectral type: B0.2 V
- U−B color index: −1.039
- B−V color index: −0.252

Astrometry
Radial velocity (R_{v})	+2.0 km/s
Proper motion (μ)	RA: −9.89 mas/yr Dec.: −22.83 mas/yr
Parallax (π)	6.88±0.53 mas
Distance	470 ± 40 ly (150 ± 10 pc)
Absolute magnitude (M_{V})	−4.2

Details
Mass	15.0±0.1, 14.5–14.7 M_{☉}
Radius	6.42 R_{☉}
Luminosity	25,000 L_{☉}
Surface gravity (log g)	4.24 cgs
Temperature	28,862 K
Metallicity [Fe/H]	−0.14 dex
Rotation	41 days
Rotational velocity (v sin i)	24 km/s
Age	5.22 Myr

Other designations
- Paikauhale, Alniyat, Al Niyat, τ Sco, 23 Sco, CD−27 11015, FK5 620, GC 22303, HD 149438, HIP 81266, HR 6165, SAO 184481

Database references
SIMBAD	data

Tau Scorpii, Latinized from τ Scorpii, formally named Paikauhale /ˌpaɪkaʊˈhɑːleɪ/, is a star in the southern zodiac constellation of Scorpius. The apparent visual magnitude of Tau Scorpii is +2.8, which makes it among the brightest stars in Scorpius. Parallax measurements yield a distance estimate of roughly 470 light-years (150 parsecs) from Earth.

== Nomenclature ==
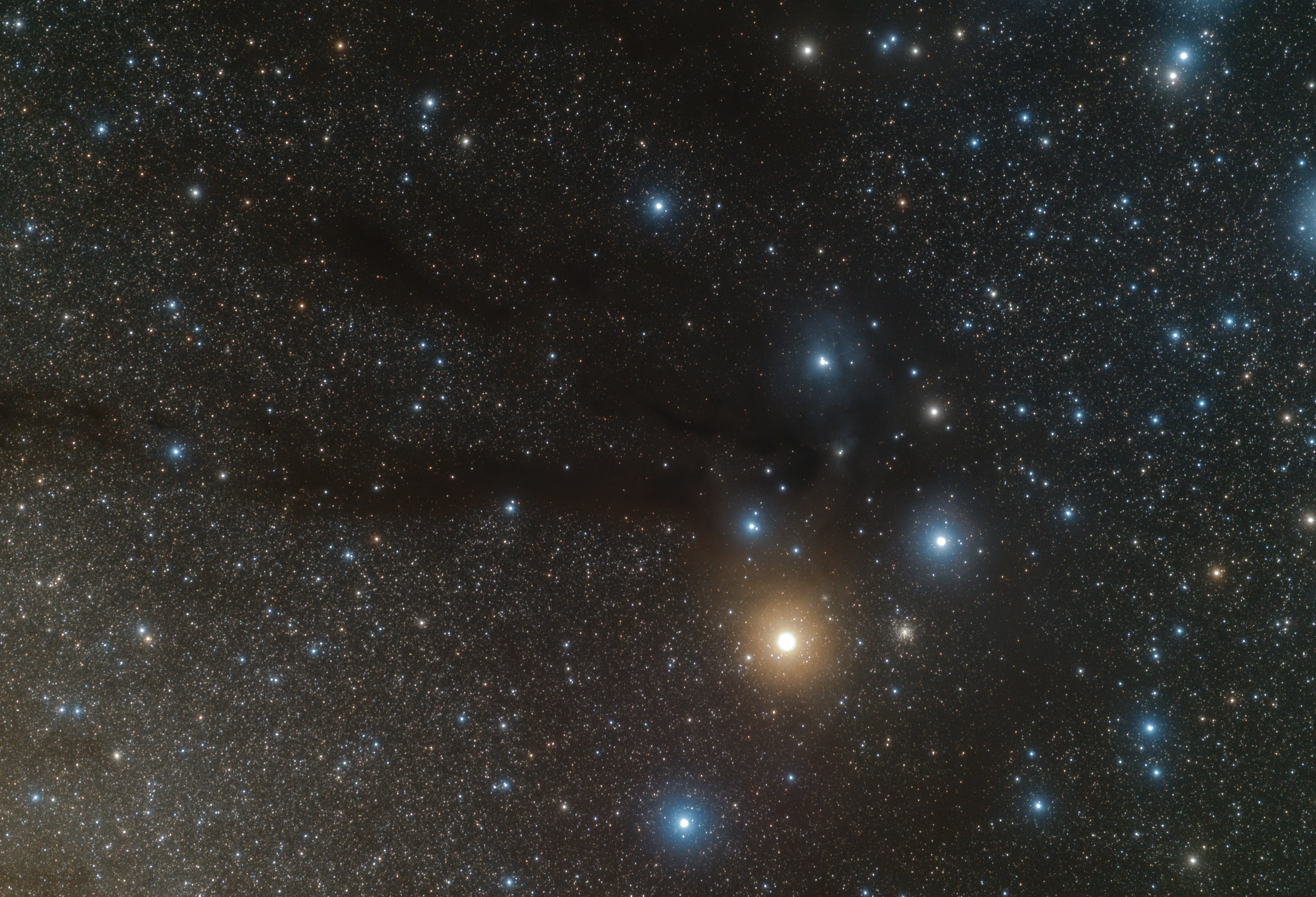
τ Scorpii, at the bottom of the frame, south-east of the bright red supergiant Antares

τ Scorpii (Latinised to Tau Scorpii) is the star's Bayer designation.

Tau Scorpii and Sigma Scorpii together bore the traditional name Al Niyat (or Alniyat) derived from the Arabic النياط al-niyāţ "the arteries" and referring to their position flanking the star Antares, the scorpion's heart, with Tau Scorpii being the star to the south.

Paikauhale is the Hawaiian name for Tau Scorpii. It forms a line of three stars with Hōkū-'ula (Antares) and Au-haele (σ Scorpii). In the Hawaiian dictionary by Pukuʻi & Elbert (1986), the word paikauhale [ˈpəiˈkəuˈhale] is defined as to go gadding about from house to house. In another Hawaiian dictionary (H.W. Kent, 1993, "Treasury of Hawaiian Words in One Hundred and One Categories", p.367), paikauhale is defined as Vagabond owning no home; house-to-house wanderer.

In 2016, the IAU organized a Working Group on Star Names (WGSN) to catalog and standardize proper names for stars. The WGSN approved the name Paikauhale for this star on 10 August 2018 and it is now so included in the IAU Catalog of Star Names. The name Alniyat was given to Sigma Scorpii.

The indigenous Boorong people of northwestern Victoria saw this star (together with σ Sco) as wives of Djuit (Antares).

In Chinese astronomy, 心宿 (Xīn Xiù), meaning Heart, refers to an asterism consisting of τ Scorpii, σ Scorpii and Antares. Consequently, the Chinese name for τ Scorpii itself is 心宿三 (Xīn Xiù sān), "the Third Star of Heart".

== Description ==
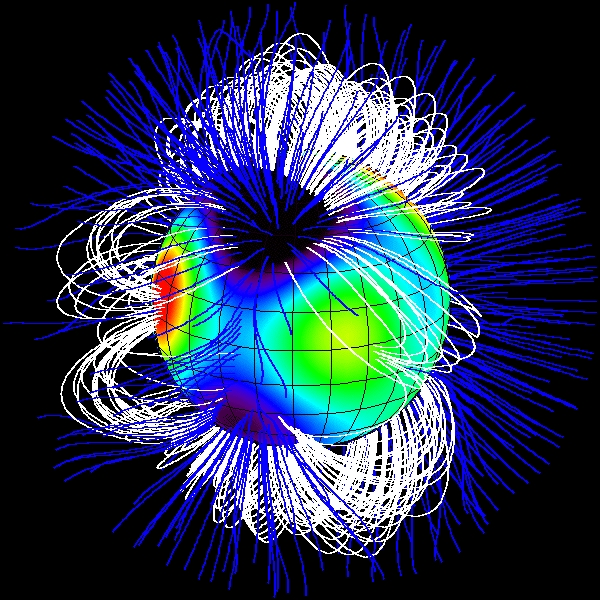
Surface magnetic field of Tau Scorpii as reconstructed by means of Zeeman–Doppler imaging

Tau Scorpii is a B-type star with an early spectral classification of B0.2V. It has 15 times the Sun's mass and 6.4 times the radius of the Sun. It is radiating about 25,000 times the Sun's luminosity from its photosphere at an effective temperature of 28,860 K. This gives it the blue-white hue characteristic of B-type stars. As yet there is no evidence of a companion in orbit around τ Sco. It is a magnetic star whose surface magnetic field was mapped by means of Zeeman–Doppler imaging. Tau Scorpii is rotating relatively slowly with a period of 41 days.

This star is 5.22 million years old, being in the main sequence. Since it is more massive than the Sun, Tau Scorpii will evolve and exhaust its core hydrogen much faster. It is expected that in around 5.38 million years it will leave the main sequence, expanding to 10.9 times the Sun's radius, and in 6.4 million years (or 11.6 Myr after its formation), it will become a red supergiant with 750 times the radius of the Sun (R_{☉}), comparable to Antares which is 680 R_{☉}.

Waters et al. (1993) suggested that Tau Scorpii may be a rapidly rotating Be star that is being viewed pole-on. To explain its slow rotation, it has also been suggested that it is a blue straggler.

The spectrum of Tau Scorpii shows triply ionized oxygen (Oiv) that is being generated by X-rays and the Auger ionization effect. Observations with the ROSAT space telescope showed it has a higher energy (harder) X-ray spectrum than is usual for B0 V stars. Over the energy range 0.8–1.2 keV, its X-ray luminosity is L_{x} = 1.8×10^{31} erg/s with a large L_{x} to L_{bol} ratio of log(L_{x})/L_{bol} = −6.53 from ASCA measurements. ROSAT measurements showed a log L_{x}/L_{bol} ≃ −5.93 for the range 0.1–2.4 keV. The hard component of the X-ray spectrum from τ Sco as studied with XMM-Newton supports the presence of in-falling clumps of plasma in τ Sco.

Tau Scorpii is a proper motion member of the Upper Scorpius subgroup of the Scorpius–Centaurus OB association, the nearest such co-moving association of massive stars to the Sun. The Upper Scorpius subgroup contains thousands of young stars with mean age 11 million years at average distance of 470 light years (145 parsecs).
