= Antares =

Binary star in the constellation Scorpius

- Location of Antares (circled)

Observation data Epoch J2000 Equinox ICRS
- Constellation: Scorpius
- Pronunciation: /ænˈtɛəriːz/ an-TAIR-eez
- Right ascension: 16^{h} 29^{m} 24.45970^{s}
- Declination: −26° 25′ 55.2094″
- Apparent magnitude (V): 0.6–1.6 + 5.5

Characteristics
- Evolutionary stage: Red supergiant
- Spectral type: M1.5Iab-Ib + B2.5V
- U−B color index: +1.34
- B−V color index: +1.83
- Variable type: Lc

Astrometry
Radial velocity (R_{v})	−3.4 km/s
Proper motion (μ)	RA: −12.11 mas/yr Dec.: −23.30 mas/yr
Parallax (π)	5.89±1.00 mas
Distance	approx. 550 ly (approx. 170 pc)
Absolute magnitude (M_{V})	−5.28 (variable)

Details

A
Mass	13 or 15–16 M_{☉}
Radius	680 (varies by 19%) R_{☉}
Luminosity	75900+53000 −31200 L_{☉}
Surface gravity (log g)	−0.1 to −0.2 cgs
Temperature	3,660±120 K
Rotational velocity (v sin i)	20 km/s
Age	15±5 Myr

B
Mass	6.7 ± 0.7 M_{☉}
Radius	4.8 ± 1.1 R_{☉}
Luminosity	2,754 L_{☉}
Surface gravity (log g)	3.9 cgs
Temperature	18,200 K
Rotational velocity (v sin i)	250 km/s

Other designations
- Cor Scorpii, Kalb al Akrab, Scorpion's Heart, Vespertilio, Alpha Sco, α Sco, 21 Sco, CD−26°11359, FK5 616, HIP 80763, HR 6134, SAO 184415, CCDM J16294-2626, WDS 16294-2626
- A: HD 148478, AAVSO 1623-26
- B: HD 148479

Database references
SIMBAD	Antares
- α Scorpii A
- α Scorpii B

Antares is the brightest star in the constellation of Scorpius. It has the Bayer designation α Scorpii, which is Latinised to Alpha Scorpii. Often referred to as "the heart of the scorpion", Antares is flanked by σ Scorpii and τ Scorpii near the center of the constellation. Distinctly reddish when viewed with the naked eye, Antares is a slow irregular variable star that ranges in brightness from an apparent visual magnitude of +0.6 down to +1.6. It is on average the fifteenth-brightest star in the night sky. Antares is the brightest and most evolved stellar member of the Scorpius–Centaurus association, the nearest OB association to the Sun. It is located about 170 parsecs (550 ly) from Earth at the rim of the Upper Scorpius subgroup, and is illuminating the Rho Ophiuchi cloud complex in its foreground.

Classified as spectral type M1.5Iab-Ib, Antares is a red supergiant, a large evolved massive star and one of the largest stars visible to the naked eye. If placed at the center of the Solar System, it would extend out to somewhere in the asteroid belt. Its mass is calculated to be 13 or 15 to 16 times that of the Sun. Antares appears as a single star when viewed with the naked eye, but it is actually a binary star system, with its two components called α Scorpii A and α Scorpii B. The brighter of the pair is the red supergiant, while the fainter is a hot main sequence star of magnitude 5.5. They have a projected separation of about 79.1 Tm (529 AU).

Its traditional name Antares derives from the Ancient Greek Ἀντάρης, meaning "rival to Ares", due to the similarity of its reddish hue to the appearance of the planet Mars.

== Nomenclature ==
Antares between τ (lower left) and σ Scorpii; Antares appears white in this WISE false-colour infrared image.

α Scorpii (Latinised to Alpha Scorpii) is the star's Bayer designation. Antares has the Flamsteed designation 21 Scorpii, as well as catalogue designations such as HR 6134 in the Bright Star Catalogue and HD 148478 in the Henry Draper Catalogue. As a prominent infrared source, it appears in the Two Micron All-Sky Survey catalogue as 2MASS J16292443-2625549 and the Infrared Astronomical Satellite (IRAS) Sky Survey Atlas catalogue as IRAS 16262–2619. It is also catalogued as a double star WDS J16294-2626 and CCDM J16294-2626. Antares is a variable star and is listed in the General Catalogue of Variable Stars, but as a Bayer-designated star it does not have a separate variable star designation.

Its traditional name Antares derives from the Ancient Greek Ἀντάρης, meaning "rival to Ares" or more bluntly "not Ares", due to the similarity of its reddish hue to the appearance of the planet Mars. The comparison of Antares with Mars was once thought to have its origin with early Mesopotamian astronomers. This is now considered an outdated speculation, because the name of this star in Mesopotamian astronomy has always been "heart of Scorpion" and it was associated with the goddess Lisin. Some scholars have speculated that the star may have been named after Antar, or Antarah ibn Shaddad, the Arab warrior-hero celebrated in the pre-Islamic poems Mu'allaqat. However, the name "Antares" is already proven in the Greek culture, e.g. in Ptolemy's Almagest and Tetrabiblos. In 2016, the International Astronomical Union organised a Working Group on Star Names (WGSN) to catalog and standardise proper names for stars. The WGSN's first bulletin of July 2016 included a table of the first two batches of names approved by the WGSN, which included Antares for the star α Scorpii A. It is now so entered in the IAU Catalog of Star Names.

== Observation ==
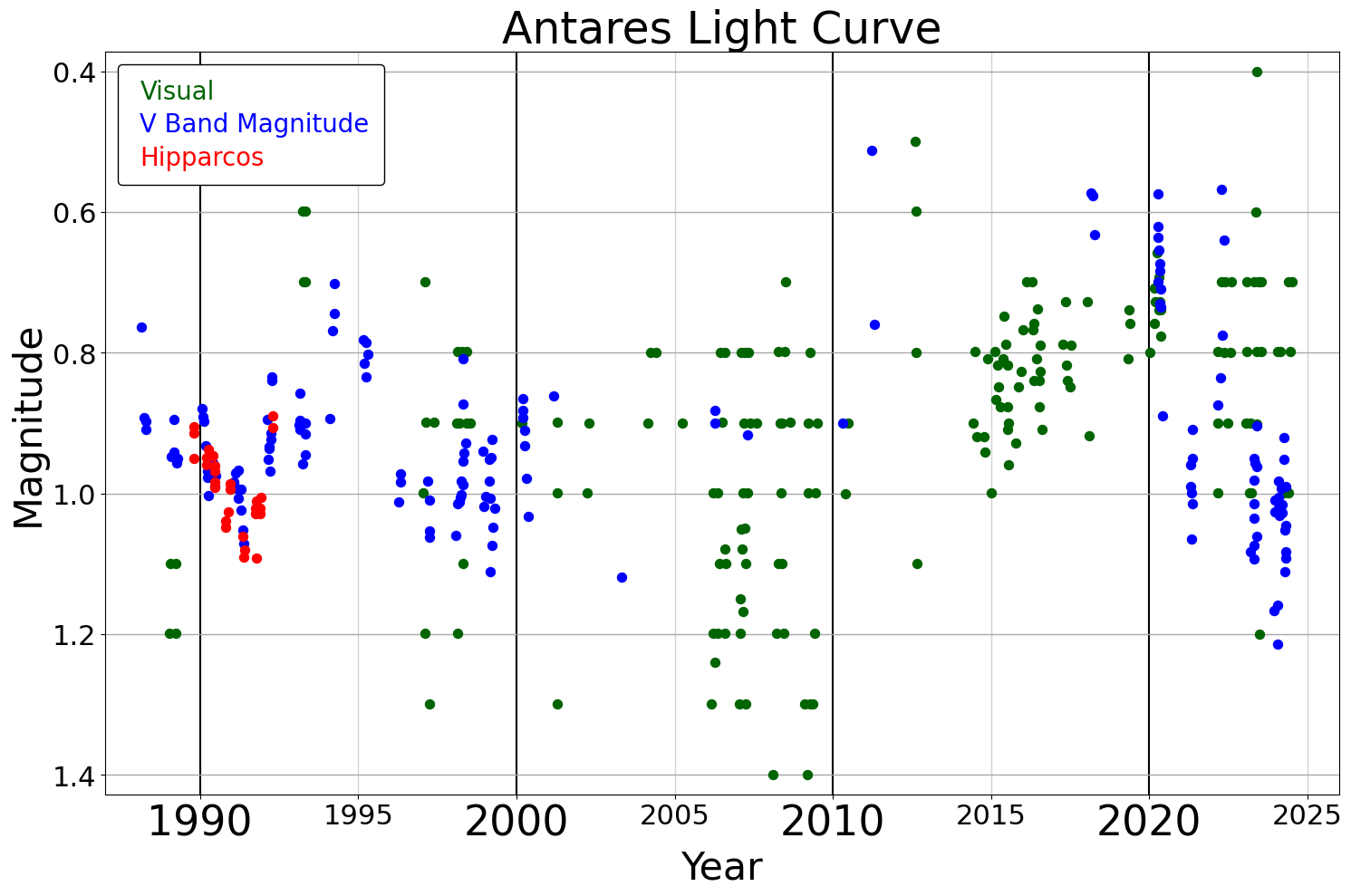
A light curve for Antares, showing AAVSO visual and V band data, along with Hipparcos data. Adapted from Marici and Guinan (2025)

Antares is visible all night around May 31 of each year, when the star is at opposition to the Sun. Antares then rises at dusk and sets at dawn as seen at the equator.

For two to three weeks on either side of November 30, Antares is not visible in the night sky from mid-northern latitudes, because it is near conjunction with the Sun. In higher northern latitudes, Antares is only visible low in the south in summertime. Higher than 64° northern latitude, the star does not rise at all.

Antares is easier to see from the southern hemisphere due to its southerly declination. In the whole of Antarctica, the star is circumpolar as the whole continent is above 64° S latitude.

=== History ===
Antares near the Sun on 30 November 2012

Radial velocity variations were observed in the spectrum of Antares in the early 20th century, and attempts were made to derive spectroscopic orbits. It became apparent that the small variations could not be due to orbital motion, and they were actually caused by pulsation of the star's atmosphere. Even in 1928, it was calculated that the size of the star must vary by about 20%.

Antares was first reported to have a companion star by Johann Tobias Bürg during an occultation on April 13, 1819, although this was not widely accepted and dismissed as a possible atmospheric effect. It was then observed by Scottish astronomer James William Grant FRSE while in India on 23 July 1844. It was rediscovered by Ormsby M. Mitchel in 1846 and measured by William Rutter Dawes in April 1847.

In 1952, Antares was reported to vary in brightness. A photographic magnitude range from 3.00 to 3.16 was described. The brightness has been monitored by the American Association of Variable Star Observers since 1945, and it has been classified as an LC slow irregular variable star, whose apparent magnitude slowly varies between extremes of +0.6 and +1.6, although usually near magnitude +1.0. There is no obvious periodicity, but statistical analyses have suggested periods of 1,733 days or 1650±640 days. No separate long secondary period has been detected, although it has been suggested that primary periods longer than a thousand days are analogous to long secondary periods.

Research published in 2018 demonstrated that Ngarrindjeri Aboriginal people from South Australia observed the variability of Antares and incorporated it into their oral traditions as Waiyungari (meaning 'red man').

=== Occultations and conjunctions ===
Lunar Occultation of Antares (reappearance) was observed on 2006 May 14 from the Blue Mountains, Australia. Antares B reappears first, followed by Antares A 7.53 seconds later.

Antares is 4.57 degrees south of the ecliptic, one of four first magnitude stars within 6° of the ecliptic (the others are Spica, Regulus and Aldebaran), so it can be occulted by the Moon. The occultation of 31 July 2009 was visible in much of southern Asia and the Middle East. Every year around December 2 the Sun passes 5° north of Antares. Lunar occultations of Antares are fairly common, depending on the 18.6-year cycle of the lunar nodes. The current cycle began in 2023 and the last cycle ended in 2010. Shown at right is a video of a reappearance event, clearly showing events for both components.

Antares can also be occulted by the planets, e.g. Venus, but these events are rare. The last occultation of Antares by Venus took place on September 17, 525 BC; the next one will be November 17, 2400. Other planets have been calculated not to have occulted Antares over the last millennium, nor will they in the next millennium, as most planets stay near the ecliptic and pass north of Antares. Venus will be extremely near Antares on October 19, 2117, and every eight years thereafter through to October 29, 2157, it will pass south of the star.

=== Illumination of Rho Ophiuchi cloud complex ===
Antares is the brightest and most evolved stellar member of the Scorpius–Centaurus association, the nearest OB association to the Sun. It is a member of the Upper Scorpius subgroup of the association, which contains thousands of stars with a mean age of 11 million years. Antares is located about 170 parsecs (550 ly) from Earth at the rim of the Upper Scorpius subgroup, and is illuminating the Rho Ophiuchi cloud complex in its foreground. The illuminated cloud is sometimes referred to as the Antares Nebula or is otherwise identified as VdB 107.

== Stellar system ==
α Scorpii is a double star that is thought to form a binary system. The best calculated orbit for the stars is still considered to be unreliable. It describes an almost circular orbit seen nearly edge-on, with a period of 1,218 years and a semi-major axis of about 2.9″. Other recent estimates of the period have ranged from 880 years for a calculated orbit, to 2,562 years for a simple Kepler's Law estimate.

Early measurements of the pair found them to be about 3.5″ apart in 1847–49, or 2.5″ apart in 1848. More modern observations consistently give separations around 2.6″ – 2.8″. The variations in the separation are often interpreted as evidence of orbital motion, but are more likely to be simply observational inaccuracies with very little true relative motion between the two components.

The pair have a projected separation of about 529 astronomical units (AU) (≈ 80 billion km) at the estimated distance of Antares, giving a minimum value for the distance between them. Spectroscopic examination of the energy states in the outflow of matter from the companion star suggests that the latter is over 220 AU beyond the primary (about 33 billion km).

=== Antares ===
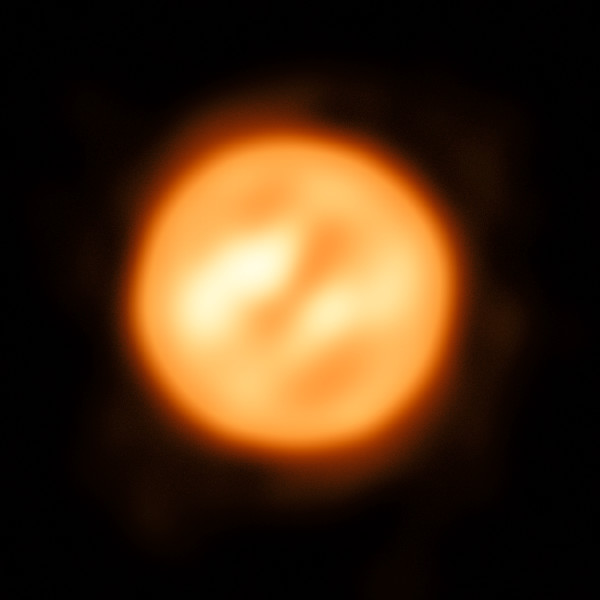
VLTI reconstructed view of the surface of Antares A

Antares is a red supergiant star with a stellar classification of M1.5Iab-Ib, and is indicated to be a spectral standard for that class. Due to the nature of the star, the derived parallax measurements have large errors, so that the true distance of Antares is approximately 550 light-years (170 parsecs) from the Sun.

The brightness of Antares at visual wavelengths is about 10,000 times that of the Sun, but because the star radiates a considerable part of its energy in the infrared part of the spectrum, the true bolometric luminosity is around 100,000 times that of the Sun. There is a large margin of error assigned to values for the bolometric luminosity, typically 30% or more. There is also considerable variation between values published by different authors, for example 75,900 L_{☉} and 97,700 L_{☉} published in 2012 and 2013.

The mass of the star has been calculated to be about 12 M_{☉}, or 11 to 14.3 M_{☉}. Comparison of the effective temperature and luminosity of Antares to theoretical evolutionary tracks for massive stars suggest a progenitor mass of 17 M_{☉} and an age of 12 million years (Myr), or an initial mass of 15 M_{☉} and an age of 11 to 15 Myr. Comparison of observations from antiquity to theoretical evolutionary tracks suggests an initial mass of 15 to 16 M_{☉}, or the possibility that Antares is on a blue loop with an initial mass of 13 M_{☉} (while excluding 14 M_{☉} as a possible mass estimate). These correspond to ages from 11.8 to 17.3 Myr. Massive stars like Antares are expected to explode as supernovae.

Like most cool supergiants, Antares's size has much uncertainty due to the tenuous and translucent nature of the extended outer regions of the star. Defining an effective temperature is difficult due to spectral lines being generated at different depths in the atmosphere, and linear measurements produce different results depending on the wavelength observed. In addition, Antares pulsates in size, varying its radius by 19%. It also varies in temperature by 150 K, lagging 70 days behind radial velocity changes which are likely to be caused by the pulsations.

The diameter of Antares can be measured most accurately using interferometry or observing lunar occultations events. An apparent diameter from occultations 41.3 ± 0.1 milliarcseconds has been published. Interferometry allows synthesis of a view of the stellar disc, which is then represented as a limb-darkened disk surrounded by an extended atmosphere. The diameter of the limb-darkened disk was measured as 37.38±0.06 milliarcseconds in 2009 and 37.31±0.09 milliarcseconds in 2010. The linear radius of the star can be calculated from its angular diameter and distance. However, the distance to Antares is not known with the same accuracy as modern measurements of its diameter.

An estimate obtained by interferometry in 1925 by Francis G. Pease at the Mount Wilson Observatory gave Antares a diameter of 400 to 430 million mi (640 to 690 million km), equal to approximately 463–497 R_{☉}, making it the then largest star known. Antares is now known to be somewhat larger; for instance, the Hipparcos satellite's trigonometric parallax of 5.89±1.00 mas with modern angular diameter estimates lead to a radius of about 680 R_{☉}. Older radii estimates exceeding 850 R_{☉} were derived from older measurements of the diameter, but those measurements are likely to have been affected by asymmetry of the atmosphere and the narrow range of infrared wavelengths observed; Antares has an extended shell which radiates strongly at those particular wavelengths. Despite its large size compared to the Sun, Antares is dwarfed by even larger red supergiants, such as VY Canis Majoris, KY Cygni, RW Cephei or Mu Cephei.

Antares, like the similarly sized red supergiant Betelgeuse in the constellation Orion, will almost certainly explode as a supernova, probably in 1.0 to 1.4 million years. For a few months, the Antares supernova could be as bright as the full moon and be visible in daytime.

=== Antares B ===
Antares B is a magnitude 5.5 blue-white main-sequence star of spectral type B2.5V; it also has numerous unusual spectral lines suggesting it has been polluted by matter ejected by Antares. It is assumed to be a relatively normal early-B main sequence star with a mass around 7 M_{☉}, a temperature around 18,500 K, and a radius of about 5 R_{☉}. As it falls short of the mass limit required for stars to undergo a supernova, it will likely expand into a red giant before dying as a massive white dwarf similar to Sirius B.

Antares B is normally difficult to see in small telescopes due to glare from Antares, but can sometimes be seen in apertures over 150 millimetres (5.9 inches). It is often described as green, but this is probably either a contrast effect, or the result of the mixing of light from the two stars when they are seen together through a telescope and are too close to be completely resolved. Antares B can sometimes be observed with a small telescope for a few seconds during lunar occultations while Antares is hidden by the Moon. Antares B appears a profound blue or bluish-green color, in contrast to the orange-red Antares.

== Etymology and mythology ==
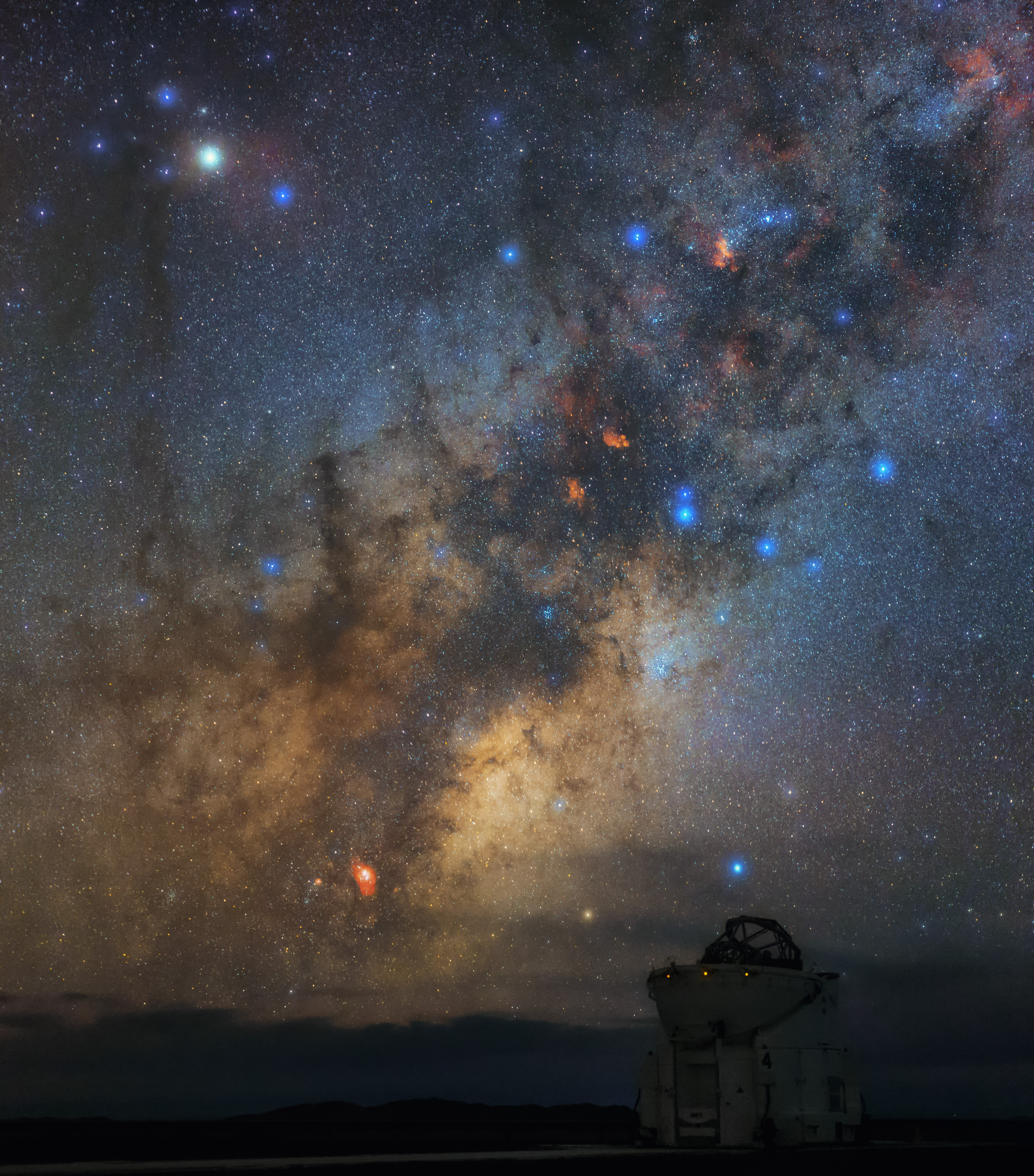
Antares seen from the ground. The very bright star towards the upper left corner of the frame is Antares.

In the Babylonian star catalogues dating from at least 1100 BCE, Antares was called GABA GIR.TAB, "the Breast of the Scorpion". In MUL.APIN, which dates between 1100 and 700 BC, it is one of the stars of Ea in the southern sky and denotes the breast of the Scorpion goddess Ishhara. Later names that translate as "the Heart of Scorpion" include Calbalakrab from the Arabic قَلْبُ ٱلْعَقْرَبِ Qalb al-ʿAqrab. This had been directly translated from the Ancient Greek Καρδία Σκορπίου Kardia Skorpiū. Cor Scorpii was a calque of the Greek name rendered in Latin.

In ancient Mesopotamia, Antares may have been known by various names: Urbat, Bilu-sha-ziri ("the Lord of the Seed"), Kak-shisa ("the Creator of Prosperity"), Dar Lugal ("The King"), Masu Sar ("the Hero and the King"), and Kakkab Bir ("the Vermilion Star"). In ancient Egypt, Antares represented the scorpion goddess Serket (and was the symbol of Isis in the pyramidal ceremonies). It was called ṯms n ẖntt "the red one of the prow".

In Persia, Antares was known as one of the four "royal stars". In India, it with σ Scorpii and τ Scorpii were Jyeshthā (the eldest or biggest, probably attributing its huge size), one of the nakshatra (Hindu lunar mansions).

The ancient Chinese called Antares 心宿二 (Xīnxiù'èr, "second star of the Heart"), because it was the second star of the mansion Xin (心). It was the national star of the Shang dynasty, and it was sometimes referred to as (Chinese: 火星; pinyin: Huǒxīng; lit. 'fiery star') because of its reddish appearance.

The Māori people of New Zealand call Antares Rēhua, and regard it as the chief of all the stars especially the Matariki. Rēhua is father of Puanga/Puaka (Rigel), an important star in the calculation of the Māori lunar calendar. For the Tahitians far tropical north, the emergence of Rehua as well as Scorpius (Matau a Maui) upon the Tahitian horizon on 18 May marks their own seasonal rāhui on tuna fishing until 30 November. The Hawaiian name of Antares is Lehua-kona ("southern lehua blossom"); it is also called Hōkūʻula, but this simply means "red star" and may also refer to Aldebaran (Kapuahi) or Mars. It forms a line of three stars with Au-haele (σ Scorpii, Alniyat) and Paikauhale (τ Scorpii). In the Marshall Islands this star, with σ and τ Scorpii, is Tūṃur, the first of the ten sons of Lōktañūr (Capella).

The Wotjobaluk Koori people of Victoria, Australia, knew Antares as Djuit, son of Marpean-kurrk (Arcturus); the stars on each side represented his wives. The Kulin Kooris saw Antares (Balayang) as the brother of Bunjil (Altair).

== In culture ==
Antares appears in the flag of Brazil, which displays 27 stars, each representing a federated unit of Brazil. Antares represents the state of Piauí.

The 1995 Oldsmobile Antares concept car is named after the star.

Antares is one of the medieval Behenian fixed stars.
