= Sh 2-1 =

Nebula

Reflection nebula

Observation data: J2000 epoch
- Right ascension: 15^{h} 58^{m} 51.2^{s}
- Declination: −26° 07′ 14″
- Distance: 650 ly (200 pc)
- Apparent dimensions (V): 2° 30'
- Constellation: Scorpius
- Designations: Sh 2-1

Sh 2-1, also known as Sharpless 1, is the combination of a diffuse HII emission nebula and reflection nebula in the constellation of Scorpius with Pi Scorpii at its center. It appears as a modest brightness making it one of the easier Sharpless catalog objects for amateur astronomers to view. It features an apparent central star, Pi Scorpii, inside the nebulosity however it is not part its system nor a left over remnant.

The nebulous area is fairly large with an irregular shape appearing as a 180° arc shape surrounding a central star. The remnant has an apparent diameter that covers approximately 150' and an estimated distance of approximately 650ly away.
