= Lynds' Catalogue of Dark Nebulae =

Catalog of Dark Nebula

- Alternative names: LDN
- Target: Dark nebulae
- Named after: Beverly Turner Lynds
- Published: 1962
- Related media on Commons

Lynds' Catalogue of Dark Nebulae (abbreviation: LDN) is an astronomical catalogue of dark nebulae.

Objects listed in the catalogue are numbered with the prefix LDN (not to be confused with LBN, or Lynds' Catalogue of Bright Nebulae), from numbers 1 to 1802.

It was originally compiled in 1962 by American astronomer Beverly Turner Lynds.

== List of LDN objects ==
Below is a list of LDN objects, with Barnard Catalogue number equivalences included.

LDN	Barnard	Right ascension (J2000.0)	Declination (J2000.0)	Galactic longitude	Galactic latitude	Area (square degrees)	Opacity (1–6)
1		16:28.9	-16:07	0.18	21.82	0.054	3
2		18:07.2	-31:30	0.13	-5.32	1.24	2
3		18:03.2	-31:00	0.15	-4.33	5.6	2
4		17:02.5	-22:12	0.18	11.82	0.004	5
5		17:16.3	-24:25	0.2	7.96	0.012	4
6		17:09.0	-23:14	0.23	9.99	0.052	3
7		17:28.6	-26:17	0.22	4.6	0.036	6
8		16:46.4	-19:15	0.3	16.59	0.084	4
9		17:10.0	-23:14	0.36	9.81	0.07	3
10		17:57.8	-30:06	0.35	-2.88	0.003	4
11	57	17:08.1	-22:54	0.38	10.36	0.012	6
12		17:58.2	-30:07	0.38	-2.96	0.003	4
13		17:04.0	-22:10	0.42	11.55	0.012	3
14	260	17:25.1	-25:33	0.4	5.67	0.02	4
15	51	17:04.4	-22:10	0.47	11.48	0.043	6
16		17:16.1	-24:03	0.48	8.2	0.12	3
17	246; 60	17:08.0	-22:44	0.5	10.47	0.404	3
18		17:09.0	-22:54	0.5	10.19	0.01	4
19	265; 264	17:29.1	-26:02	0.49	4.64	0.642	4
20		17:08.5	-22:44	0.57	10.38	0.047	4
21		17:29.1	-25:56	0.57	4.7	0.023	5
22		16:46.9	-18:55	0.65	16.7	0.28	3
23		17:17.2	-23:58	0.71	8.03	0.002	5
24		17:17.5	-24:01	0.7	7.94	0.004	5
25		17:32.5	-26:11	0.78	3.92	0.007	6
26		18:05.2	-30:30	0.79	-4.46	0.034	3
27		16:27.8	-15:07	0.85	22.64	3.46	1
28		17:19.1	-24:03	0.87	7.64	2.22	2
29		18:06.8	-30:38	0.85	-4.83	0.03	3
30		17:13.0	-23:04	0.91	9.34	0.215	1
31		16:49.9	-19:05	0.96	16.04	0.022	6
32		17:11.0	-22:39	0.98	9.96	0.111	4
33		16:41.4	-17:26	1.05	18.65	0.312	2
34		17:48.2	-28:01	1.08	0	25	3
35	289	17:56.5	-29:04	1.1	-2.11	0.02	4
36	267	17:28.7	-25:12	1.13	5.18	0.004	5
37		17:20.0	-23:53	1.14	7.55	0.014	3
38		17:11.3	-22:29	1.16	10	0.008	5
39	317	17:11.6	-22:30	1.19	9.93	0.017	5
40		17:57.2	-29:04	1.17	-2.24	0.029	4
41		18:05.2	-30:00	1.23	-4.22	0.009	3
42	78	17:33.1	-25:42	1.26	4.08	1.45	4
43		16:34.5	-15:50	1.31	20.94	0.07	6
44		17:20.0	-23:43	1.28	7.64	0.036	1
45		17:31.1	-25:22	1.29	4.64	0.348	4
46		17:13.0	-22:34	1.32	9.63	0.348	3
47		16:49.9	-18:35	1.37	16.34	0.28	3
48		17:58.2	-29:00	1.34	-2.4	6.14	1
49		18:02.2	-29:30	1.35	-3.4	1.04	3
50	76; 73	17:25.1	-24:23	1.37	6.32	0.018	4
51		17:12.6	-22:21	1.45	9.83	0.034	4
52		17:32.2	-25:21	1.44	4.44	0.006	6
53	71	17:23.1	-23:55	1.52	6.94	0.001	6
54	70	17:23.5	-23:58	1.53	6.84	0.002	4
55	69	17:23.0	-23:53	1.53	6.98	0.003	6
56		17:15.0	-22:33	1.59	9.25	0.462	3
57	68	17:22.6	-23:44	1.61	7.14	0.003	6
58		17:30.5	-24:55	1.6	5	0.004	5
59	255	17:20.6	-23:23	1.64	7.72	0.007	3
60		17:12.0	-21:59	1.67	10.16	0.035	4
61		17:31.4	-24:55	1.71	4.83	0.008	5
62		16:49.9	-18:05	1.79	16.64	1.74	1
63		16:49.9	-18:05	1.79	16.64	0.037	6
64		17:40.1	-26:02	1.83	2.57	0.995	4
65		17:13.0	-21:54	1.88	10.01	0.088	6
66	72	17:24.0	-23:33	1.94	6.98	0.009	6
67		17:14.0	-21:53	2.01	9.82	0.088	5
68		18:07.1	-29:22	1.99	-4.27	0.006	3
69	77; 269	17:28.1	-24:02	2.03	5.94	2.19	3
70		17:25.0	-23:33	2.07	6.79	0.01	4
71		17:14.0	-21:43	2.15	9.92	0.142	4
72		17:20.0	-22:33	2.25	8.3	0.308	2
73		17:31.1	-24:12	2.27	5.28	0.278	2
74		17:38.1	-25:12	2.3	3.4	0.038	6
75		18:08.2	-29:10	2.28	-4.38	0.068	1
76		17:37.1	-25:02	2.31	3.68	0.531	3
77		17:19.0	-22:15	2.37	8.66	0.005	2
78	294	18:01.2	-28:11	2.38	-2.56	0.001	3
79		17:15.0	-21:28	2.49	9.87	0.3	4
80		17:39.1	-25:07	2.49	3.25	0.005	5
81	74	17:25.0	-23:01	2.52	7.08	0.009	5
82		17:46.1	-26:01	2.55	1.43	2.26	2
83		16:34.3	-14:16	2.62	21.92	0.056	5
84		17:36.1	-24:32	2.61	4.14	0.328	4
85	261	17:26.0	-23:01	2.64	6.89	0.036	4
86		17:21.0	-22:13	2.66	8.3	0.063	2
87		17:18.6	-21:48	2.7	8.99	0.001	5
88		17:20.5	-22:03	2.74	8.49	0.027	2
89		17:18.5	-21:42	2.77	9.07	0.005	5
90		17:39.6	-24:52	2.76	3.29	0.036	5
91	262	17:23.5	-22:28	2.78	7.68	0.016	4
92		17:19.0	-21:43	2.82	8.96	0.005	5
93	86	18:02.7	-27:50	2.86	-2.69	0.007	5
94		17:20.0	-21:46	2.91	8.74	0.041	2
95		17:20.0	-21:41	2.98	8.79	0.01	5
96		18:08.2	-28:20	3.01	-3.97	0.03	1
97		18:07.4	-28:11	3.06	-3.75	0.011	3
98		16:35.8	-13:57	3.13	21.83	0.011	4
99	63	17:19.0	-21:23	3.1	9.15	0.09	3
100	62	17:16.0	-20:53	3.11	10.01	0.075	6
101		17:21.8	-21:48	3.12	8.38	0.002	5
102	67A	17:22.5	-21:53	3.14	8.2	0.035	6
103		17:21.5	-21:43	3.15	8.48	0.009	3
104		17:16.0	-20:48	3.18	10.06	0.019	6
105		16:36.4	-13:57	3.22	21.72	0.001	5
106		16:36.7	-13:57	3.27	21.66	0.001	5
107		17:26.0	-22:18	3.25	7.29	0.023	5
108		18:10.2	-28:19	3.22	-4.36	0.003	6
109	83	17:39.1	-24:07	3.33	3.79	0.007	5
110	82; 81	16:49.9	-16:05	3.47	17.84	0.354	3
111	61	17:15.2	-20:21	3.45	10.47	0.007	6
112	75	17:25.0	-21:53	3.47	7.71	0.034	5
113		17:38.5	-23:52	3.48	4.02	0.041	2
114		17:40.1	-24:02	3.53	3.64	0.496	2
115		16:53.9	-16:40	3.57	16.72	0.142	3
116		18:06.5	-27:30	3.57	-3.26	0.002	3
117		17:25.0	-21:43	3.61	7.81	0.172	2
118		16:54.9	-16:45	3.65	16.47	0.054	4
119		18:03.1	-27:00	3.63	-2.35	0.342	2
120	299	18:06.4	-27:25	3.63	-3.2	0.01	3
121		16:39.8	-14:01	3.7	21.02	0.017	5
122		16:55.2	-16:45	3.69	16.42	0.02	6
123		18:07.6	-27:25	3.76	-3.43	0.002	4
124		18:13.2	-27:59	3.84	-4.78	4.32	2
125	272	17:36.0	-23:02	3.88	4.95	0.975	3
126		17:43.1	-24:01	3.89	3.06	0.361	1
127		18:08.1	-27:19	3.9	-3.48	0.007	4
128		17:31.0	-22:12	3.96	6.37	0.81	2
129		16:55.0	-16:20	4.01	16.7	0.009	6
130	281	17:45.1	-24:11	3.99	2.58	0.296	2
131		17:25.0	-21:13	4.03	8.08	0.362	3
132		16:54.9	-16:15	4.07	16.77	0.052	4
133		17:59.1	-26:00	4.05	-1.08	0.117	4
134		15:53.6	-04:39	4.18	35.75	0.22	5
135		18:02.1	-26:20	4.1	-1.83	0.008	4
136		17:29.0	-21:42	4.12	7.03	0.151	1
137		16:50.9	-15:25	4.18	18.04	0.896	4
138		17:24.0	-20:53	4.18	8.46	1.03	1
139	251	17:16.8	-19:43	4.2	10.52	0.115	3
140		17:53.1	-25:01	4.22	0.59	1.01	2
141		16:50.9	-15:15	4.32	18.14	0.077	5
142	279	17:43.0	-23:31	4.32	3.32	1.48	3
143		18:10.1	-26:59	4.39	-3.71	0.5	3
144	277	17:40.5	-23:02	4.44	4.07	0.029	4
145		16:35.3	-12:16	4.49	22.95	0.145	1
146		16:56.4	-16:00	4.5	16.62	0.066	5
147		18:04.1	-26:10	4.46	-2.14	0.047	4
148		16:46.4	-14:10	4.58	19.64	0.012	5
149	266	17:27.0	-20:53	4.57	7.88	0.518	3
150		17:57.1	-25:00	4.68	-0.19	13.55	3
151		18:06.1	-26:10	4.68	-2.53	0.398	2
152		16:49.8	-14:35	4.74	18.72	1.04	3
153		17:40.0	-22:37	4.73	4.39	0.511	3
154		17:42.0	-22:51	4.76	3.87	0.497	1
155		17:38.0	-22:17	4.76	4.96	1.61	2
156		16:37.3	-12:16	4.81	22.56	0.127	1
157		18:09.1	-26:24	4.8	-3.24	0.008	4
158		16:47.8	-14:05	4.86	19.41	0.056	6
159		17:48.5	-23:41	4.83	2.16	0.071	1
160		17:45.0	-23:11	4.84	3.11	0.054	2
161		17:51.1	-24:01	4.85	1.5	0.117	2
162		16:49.1	-14:15	4.92	19.06	0.124	6
163		16:49.8	-14:20	4.95	18.87	0.032	2
164		17:37.0	-21:52	4.99	5.38	0.063	3
165		18:16.1	-26:59	5.04	-4.89	0.054	1
166		18:02.1	-25:10	5.11	-1.25	0.008	5
167		18:06.1	-25:40	5.12	-2.28	0.144	1
168	80	17:33.0	-21:02	5.2	6.61	1.05	3
169		15:52.6	-03:19	5.28	36.77	0.86	4
170		17:47.0	-23:01	5.23	2.8	0.479	1
171		18:03.1	-25:10	5.22	-1.44	0.316	2
172	274	17:38.0	-21:37	5.33	5.32	0.026	4
173	64	17:17.2	-18:23	5.39	11.17	0.02	6
174		17:39.0	-21:42	5.38	5.08	0.02	3
175		17:18.3	-18:31	5.43	10.88	0.016	5
176		18:10.1	-25:49	5.42	-3.15	0.308	2
177	259	17:22.9	-19:13	5.45	9.58	0.034	4
178	268	17:32.0	-20:32	5.49	7.08	0.672	4
179		17:23.9	-19:18	5.51	9.34	0.047	1
180		18:03.1	-24:45	5.58	-1.24	2.76	1
181		18:31.2	-28:05	5.59	-8.35	0.008	3
182		17:33.0	-20:32	5.62	6.88	1.11	2
183		15:53.9	-03:09	5.7	36.62	0.24	5
185	270	17:32.0	-20:17	5.7	7.22	0.108	5
186		17:44.0	-22:01	5.72	3.92	0.3	1
187		18:12.1	-25:44	5.71	-3.5	0.694	2
188		17:53.0	-23:11	5.8	1.53	0.298	4
189		17:43.0	-21:41	5.88	4.29	0.596	1
190		16:48.3	-12:55	5.94	20	0.022	4
191		16:47.8	-12:45	6.01	20.2	0.158	5
192		17:31.0	-19:47	6	7.68	0.278	5
193		17:36.0	-20:32	6	6.29	0.104	4
194		18:13.1	-25:29	6.04	-3.58	0.316	3
195	306	18:15.9	-25:44	6.12	-4.25	0.003	3
196		18:10.1	-24:59	6.15	-2.74	0.002	5
197		18:13.1	-25:20	6.17	-3.51	0.014	2
198		18:13.6	-25:22	6.19	-3.62	0.01	4
199		18:15.1	-25:27	6.28	-3.96	0.001	5
200		18:10.1	-24:49	6.29	-2.66	1.05	2
201		18:20.1	-25:59	6.35	-5.2	3.45	2
202		17:38.5	-20:22	6.46	5.88	0.122	2
203		18:14.4	-25:10	6.45	-3.68	0.004	4
204		16:47.8	-12:05	6.59	20.58	0.167	6
205		18:26.1	-26:23	6.6	-6.59	0.026	2
206		17:30.9	-19:02	6.64	8.09	3.56	3
207	280	17:45.0	-21:01	6.69	4.24	2	3
208		18:13.1	-24:39	6.77	-3.18	0.032	1
209		17:38.0	-19:52	6.82	6.25	0.013	4
210	303	18:09.2	-24:07	6.8	-2.14	0.001	5
211		18:09.6	-24:09	6.82	-2.24	0.008	5
212		18:11.1	-24:19	6.84	-2.62	0.093	5
213	302	18:09.1	-24:00	6.89	-2.07	0.001	5
214		18:09.1	-23:58	6.92	-2.05	0.001	5
215		17:58.0	-22:30	6.96	0.88	8.83	2
216	79	17:38.0	-19:40	6.99	6.36	0.011	6
217		18:28.1	-26:08	7.03	-6.87	0.009	2
218		17:55.0	-21:58	7.06	1.75	0.025	3
219		17:39.5	-19:47	7.08	5.99	0.084	6
220		17:30.9	-18:28	7.12	8.4	0.007	4
221		18:11.1	-23:59	7.13	-2.46	1.62	3
222		17:41.2	-19:46	7.29	5.65	0.001	6
223		17:40.8	-19:43	7.3	5.77	0.001	6
224		18:08.5	-23:29	7.29	-1.71	0.015	5
225		17:32.9	-18:32	7.32	7.96	0.088	2
226		17:40.6	-19:40	7.32	5.84	0.003	6
227	90	18:10.1	-23:39	7.31	-2.09	0.05	5
228		17:40.8	-19:38	7.37	5.81	0.002	6
229		17:40.2	-19:31	7.39	6	0.002	6
230		18:09.0	-23:27	7.37	-1.8	0.003	5
231	83A	17:40.4	-19:32	7.4	5.95	0.001	6
232		18:05.0	-22:50	7.47	-0.68	0.086	1
233		17:45.1	-20:01	7.56	4.74	0.001	6
234		16:48.8	-11:05	7.61	20.96	1.41	3
235	84	17:46.5	-20:11	7.59	4.38	0.038	6
236		18:26.1	-25:18	7.57	-6.09	0.029	3
237		18:01.0	-22:10	7.59	0.45	0.524	1
238		16:35.7	-08:46	7.66	24.93	0.054	3
239	98	18:33.4	-26:01	7.68	-7.88	0.018	6
240		18:37.1	-26:22	7.73	-8.79	0.022	3
241		18:11.5	-23:19	7.77	-2.23	0.021	4
242		18:12.1	-23:24	7.76	-2.39	0.01	4
243		18:12.0	-23:19	7.83	-2.33	0.524	3
244		16:51.8	-11:15	7.92	20.27	0.086	4
245		18:31.1	-25:28	7.94	-7.17	0.44	1
246		17:45.0	-19:31	7.98	5.02	10	3
247		18:24.1	-24:33	8.03	-5.34	0.034	1
248		18:36.1	-25:47	8.15	-8.33	0.052	1
249		18:10.0	-22:29	8.33	-1.53	0.19	1
250		18:23.4	-24:08	8.32	-5	0.002	3
251		18:29.1	-24:48	8.33	-6.46	0.185	1
252		18:23.2	-24:03	8.38	-4.93	0.004	3
253		18:40.1	-25:57	8.41	-9.21	0.689	1
254		17:50.0	-19:41	8.44	3.93	0.235	2
255		16:47.7	-09:55	8.48	21.84	0.032	6
256		18:15.0	-22:59	8.45	-2.78	0.377	2
257		18:11.0	-22:24	8.52	-1.69	0.075	2
258		17:44.9	-18:51	8.55	5.37	0.18	2
259		18:25.1	-23:59	8.64	-5.28	0.023	3
260		16:47.7	-09:35	8.78	22.03	0.074	6
261		17:35.9	-17:12	8.84	8.07	0.268	2
262		18:03.0	-21:00	8.84	0.63	0.009	6
263		18:36.1	-24:57	8.91	-7.95	2.43	2
264		17:48.9	-18:51	9.04	4.56	0.142	2
265		18:17.0	-22:29	9.11	-2.94	0.33	2
266		18:31.1	-24:08	9.14	-6.56	0.418	2
267		18:23.5	-23:08	9.23	-4.58	0.005	2
268		18:23.5	-23:08	9.23	-4.58	0.005	4
269	276	18:29.5	-23:48	9.28	-6.11	0.041	2
271		18:11.0	-21:19	9.46	-1.16	0.016	3
272	308	18:18.0	-22:09	9.51	-2.99	0.07	3
273		17:44.4	-17:36	9.56	6.12	0.007	3
274		18:09.3	-20:57	9.59	-0.64	0.02	4
275		18:12.0	-21:11	9.69	-1.3	0.001	3
276		17:43.9	-17:21	9.71	6.35	0.043	3
277		17:45.4	-17:29	9.78	5.98	0.005	3
278		16:58.8	-10:15	9.83	19.41	1.15	3
279		17:52.9	-18:31	9.81	3.92	0.462	2
280		16:58.7	-10:05	9.98	19.51	0.251	4
281		18:05.0	-20:00	9.94	0.72	1.28	2
282		18:13.0	-20:59	9.98	-1.41	0.052	4
283		17:38.9	-16:02	10.23	8.07	4.78	2
284		18:36.0	-23:27	10.26	-7.28	0.199	1
285		17:55.9	-18:20	10.32	3.39	0.214	4
286		18:01.9	-19:10	10.31	1.74	0.115	2
287		17:22.8	-13:23	10.43	12.77	0.158	1
288		17:57.9	-18:30	10.41	2.9	0.05	5
289		18:00.9	-18:50	10.48	2.11	0.027	2
290		17:42.9	-16:01	10.73	7.25	1.32	1
291		18:20.0	-20:59	10.76	-2.84	0.274	4
292		17:57.7	-18:00	10.82	3.19	0.05	4
293		17:57.9	-18:00	10.85	3.15	2.02	1
294		18:32.0	-22:18	10.88	-5.93	0.002	3
295		18:32.8	-22:21	10.92	-6.12	0.002	3
296		18:32.5	-22:18	10.94	-6.03	0.002	3
297		18:47.0	-23:57	10.93	-9.76	0.176	1
298		17:58.9	-18:00	10.97	2.94	0.106	3
299		17:00.7	-09:14	11	19.56	0.208	2
300		18:51.1	-24:16	11.03	-10.72	0.37	1
301		18:35.4	-22:30	11.06	-6.72	0.018	2
302	84A	17:57.5	-17:40	11.09	3.4	0.04	5
303	304; 301; 297	18:07.9	-19:00	11.16	0.59	18	3
304		18:35.0	-22:08	11.35	-6.47	0.02	2
305		17:49.9	-16:16	11.39	5.68	4.17	2
306		18:23.2	-20:38	11.41	-3.34	0.025	4
307		18:06.2	-18:27	11.44	1.21	0.001	6
308		18:06.7	-18:26	11.51	1.12	0.001	6
309		18:31.0	-21:28	11.52	-5.34	0.014	4
310		18:06.9	-18:22	11.59	1.11	0.004	6
311		18:49.5	-23:27	11.64	-10.06	0.224	2
312		17:50.9	-16:01	11.73	5.6	2.61	1
313	99	18:33.5	-21:33	11.71	-5.9	0.018	3
314		18:21.0	-19:59	11.76	-2.57	3.6	3
315		18:18.0	-19:29	11.86	-1.71	6	2
316		18:44.7	-22:37	11.91	-8.7	0.108	1
317		17:00.7	-08:04	12.04	20.2	1.6	4
318		17:59.9	-16:50	12.1	3.32	0.009	4
319		18:01.9	-16:50	12.34	2.9	0.043	1
320		17:59.9	-16:30	12.39	3.48	1.42	2
321		18:50.3	-22:38	12.45	-9.88	0.025	3
322		18:19.9	-18:59	12.53	-1.89	1.29	2
323	92	18:15.5	-18:11	12.73	-0.59	0.016	6
324		17:21.8	-10:23	12.91	14.58	5.8	1
325		17:53.9	-15:01	12.96	5.49	0.9	3
326		17:49.8	-14:26	12.97	6.62	0.03	4
327	93	18:16.9	-18:04	12.99	-0.83	0.011	4
328		18:16.9	-18:00	13.05	-0.8	0.001	6
329		18:40.5	-20:52	13.06	-7.05	0.052	2
330	284	17:50.4	-14:17	13.18	6.57	0.011	6
331		18:16.9	-17:49	13.21	-0.71	0.005	4
332		18:20.9	-18:09	13.37	-1.7	0.014	3
333		18:10.9	-16:49	13.39	1.03	0.498	1
334		18:40.0	-20:27	13.38	-6.76	0.075	1
335	307	18:19.1	-17:49	13.46	-1.17	0.004	3
336		18:19.9	-17:54	13.48	-1.38	0.047	3
337		17:57.9	-14:51	13.58	4.73	0.022	4
339		17:56.6	-14:35	13.65	5.13	0.016	4
340		17:58.9	-14:36	13.92	4.64	0.035	3
341		17:59.3	-14:40	13.92	4.5	0.011	4
342		18:21.9	-17:39	13.92	-1.68	0.795	1
343		18:28.9	-18:24	14.03	-3.5	0.987	3
344	315	18:42.0	-19:57	14.04	-6.95	0.016	3
345		17:53.8	-13:41	14.12	6.16	0.24	2
346		18:43.0	-19:57	14.15	-7.16	0.016	3
347		18:07.9	-15:30	14.21	2.31	0.19	2
348		18:09.9	-15:39	14.3	1.81	0.027	2
349		17:51.1	-13:01	14.37	7.06	0.011	4
350	310	18:27.9	-17:48	14.45	-3.01	0.145	3
351		18:23.9	-17:13	14.52	-1.9	0.029	4
352		17:45.8	-12:01	14.58	8.68	5.25	1
353		18:32.9	-18:18	14.56	-4.3	3.33	1
354		18:24.9	-17:15	14.6	-2.13	0.029	4
355		17:51.8	-12:41	14.74	7.08	0.075	4
356	311	18:30.4	-17:43	14.8	-3.5	0.011	4
357		18:15.9	-15:44	14.92	0.5	0.151	1
358		17:52.8	-12:31	15.01	6.95	0.75	3
359		18:22.9	-16:28	15.07	-1.33	5	3
360		17:51.7	-12:16	15.09	7.31	0.009	5
361		17:52.0	-12:11	15.2	7.29	0.012	5
362		18:29.9	-17:08	15.26	-3.13	0.465	2
363		17:58.8	-13:00	15.31	5.44	2.19	2
364		18:34.9	-17:38	15.37	-4.41	0.102	3
365		18:42.9	-18:27	15.5	-6.49	0.093	1
367		17:49.8	-11:01	15.95	8.34	0.8	4
368		18:05.3	-13:10	15.95	3.98	1.55	4
369		18:46.1	-18:12	16.06	-7.05	0.016	2
370		18:30.6	-16:13	16.15	-2.85	0.009	4
371		17:17.7	-06:03	16.2	17.7	1.02	2
372		18:30.6	-16:04	16.29	-2.78	0.001	6
373		17:25.7	-07:03	16.38	15.48	0.395	1
374		18:29.9	-15:48	16.44	-2.5	0.348	3
375		18:08.8	-12:59	16.51	3.32	0.118	4
376		18:22.9	-14:38	16.68	-0.47	0.73	4
377		19:32.3	-22:24	16.74	-18.64	0.002	3
378		18:36.9	-15:57	17.08	-4.07	0.088	3
379	312	18:30.9	-15:08	17.15	-2.41	0.181	4
380		18:22.8	-13:58	17.27	-0.15	0.258	4
381		18:37.4	-15:47	17.28	-4.1	0.005	4
382		17:47.7	-09:01	17.45	9.77	0.219	4
383		18:02.8	-11:00	17.54	5.57	0.754	3
384		18:02.8	-10:45	17.76	5.69	7.16	1
385		18:34.9	-14:51	17.85	-3.13	0.011	3
386		18:12.8	-11:59	17.86	2.95	18.7	3
387		17:18.6	-04:03	18.14	18.51	0.548	2
388		18:32.8	-14:13	18.18	-2.41	5.89	1
389		18:32.8	-14:08	18.26	-2.37	0.121	3
390		18:35.8	-14:28	18.3	-3.17	0.147	3
391		17:15.6	-03:03	18.65	19.67	0.393	3
392		17:53.7	-08:31	18.64	8.73	0.01	5
393		17:44.7	-07:11	18.69	11.33	20	2
394		18:21.8	-12:14	18.69	0.89	1.5	1
395		18:38.8	-14:07	18.93	-3.66	0.416	3
396		18:32.0	-13:13	18.98	-1.77	0.004	3
397		18:02.7	-09:20	19.01	6.39	0.283	4
398		18:32.8	-13:18	19	-1.98	0.011	3
399		18:26.8	-12:28	19.05	-0.3	1.05	1
400		17:55.7	-08:15	19.1	8.43	0.095	4
401	102	18:38.1	-13:47	19.15	-3.36	0.007	5
402		18:29.8	-12:43	19.17	-1.06	0.006	5
403		18:36.8	-13:27	19.3	-2.92	0.011	4
404		18:29.8	-12:28	19.39	-0.95	0.013	2
405		18:22.8	-11:28	19.47	1.03	10.5	3
406	95	18:25.8	-11:48	19.52	0.23	0.746	5
408		18:10.7	-09:29	19.82	4.58	0.474	4
409		18:41.8	-13:27	19.86	-4	1.46	4
410		18:42.8	-13:27	19.97	-4.22	5	3
411		18:27.8	-11:28	20.05	-0.05	0.01	5
412		18:31.8	-11:58	20.06	-1.15	0.018	4
413		18:26.6	-11:13	20.13	0.33	0.01	5
414		18:24.3	-10:50	20.2	1.01	0.01	5
415	96; 94	18:24.8	-10:38	20.44	1	0.14	4
416		18:25.3	-10:38	20.49	0.89	0.005	6
417		18:25.3	-10:36	20.52	0.9	0.003	5
418		18:14.7	-09:09	20.59	3.87	0.16	3
419		18:12.7	-08:39	20.79	4.55	0.108	4
420		18:25.8	-10:18	20.85	0.94	0.01	5
421		17:54.3	-05:49	21.1	9.93	0.02	5
422		18:11.7	-08:09	21.11	5	0.007	6
423		18:27.8	-10:13	21.15	0.54	0.012	5
424		18:14.7	-08:29	21.17	4.19	0.131	3
425		17:46.8	-04:41	21.19	12.09	0.017	5
426		18:11.5	-07:57	21.26	5.14	0.001	3
427		18:26.8	-09:48	21.4	0.95	0.004	5
428		17:47.6	-04:31	21.43	12	0.37	3
429		18:16.7	-08:19	21.56	3.84	0.068	6
430		18:11.7	-07:37	21.58	5.26	0.003	5
431		18:13.7	-07:49	21.64	4.73	0.093	4
432		17:58.7	-05:45	21.68	9	0.008	6
433		18:42.8	-11:27	21.75	-3.3	1.71	1
434		18:42.8	-11:27	21.75	-3.3	1.11	4
435	97	18:32.8	-09:58	21.95	-0.43	8.4	4
436		18:14.7	-07:24	22.13	4.71	0.006	6
437		18:20.2	-07:59	22.26	3.23	0.163	5
438		18:14.2	-07:09	22.29	4.94	0.008	6
439		17:59.7	-05:00	22.47	9.14	0.181	3
440		18:19.7	-07:29	22.65	3.58	0.014	4
441		18:03.7	-05:20	22.65	8.11	2.56	2
442		17:57.7	-04:30	22.67	9.82	0.014	4
443	100; 101	18:32.7	-09:08	22.69	-0.04	0.045	5
444		18:02.7	-05:00	22.83	8.48	1.03	4
445	314	18:37.7	-09:37	22.82	-1.37	0.086	5
446		18:30.7	-08:38	22.9	0.63	0.14	4
447		18:15.7	-06:39	22.91	4.85	0.546	4
448		18:36.7	-09:17	23	-0.99	0.027	4
449		18:51.8	-11:06	23.06	-5.11	0.05	2
450		18:32.7	-08:38	23.13	0.19	0.048	4
451		18:21.7	-07:09	23.17	3.3	0.022	5
452		18:56.8	-11:36	23.17	-6.43	1.27	3
453		18:24.7	-07:28	23.23	2.49	2.43	3
454		18:28.7	-07:58	23.25	1.38	0.14	4
455		18:37.7	-09:07	23.26	-1.13	0.018	5
456	321	18:52.8	-10:56	23.32	-5.26	0.032	3
458		18:56.8	-11:26	23.32	-6.36	1.27	3
459		18:42.8	-09:37	23.38	-2.46	3	3
460		17:58.6	-03:45	23.46	9.96	0.006	6
461		18:09.7	-05:09	23.52	6.87	0.117	4
462		18:06.7	-04:40	23.61	7.77	0.041	6
463		18:31.7	-07:58	23.6	0.72	1	3
464		18:52.8	-10:36	23.62	-5.11	0.034	3
466		18:19.7	-06:09	23.82	4.21	0.012	6
467		18:19.0	-05:59	23.89	4.44	0.006	5
468		18:00.6	-03:30	23.92	9.64	0.016	5
469		18:13.5	-05:06	24.02	6.07	0.003	5
470		18:18.7	-05:44	24.07	4.63	0.007	6
471		18:19.7	-05:49	24.12	4.37	0.056	4
472		18:14.2	-04:59	24.21	5.97	0.032	4
473		18:37.7	-07:57	24.29	-0.59	0.224	3
474		18:51.8	-09:41	24.33	-4.47	1.76	1
475		18:19.2	-05:29	24.35	4.63	0.029	4
476		18:18.7	-05:24	24.37	4.78	0.004	3
478		18:12.7	-04:29	24.47	6.53	0.104	4
479		18:19.2	-05:09	24.65	4.79	0.003	5
480		18:44.7	-08:27	24.65	-2.36	0.44	1
481		18:25.7	-05:58	24.67	2.97	7.26	2
482		18:19.2	-05:07	24.68	4.81	0.014	5
483		18:17.7	-04:49	24.77	5.28	0.038	6
484		18:39.7	-07:27	24.97	-0.8	1.87	2
485		18:36.7	-06:57	25.06	0.09	0.665	4
486		18:06.6	-03:00	25.09	8.56	1.53	3
487		18:16.8	-04:19	25.12	5.69	0.004	4
488		18:16.6	-04:14	25.17	5.77	0.004	4
489		18:28.7	-05:38	25.32	2.47	0.238	3
490		18:15.1	-03:49	25.36	6.3	0.002	6
491		18:27.7	-05:28	25.35	2.77	0.262	3
492		18:15.6	-03:49	25.42	6.19	0.008	6
493		18:12.6	-03:19	25.51	7.08	0.081	4
494		18:37.0	-06:27	25.54	0.25	0.011	4
495		18:38.9	-06:39	25.58	-0.26	0.002	6
496	109	18:47.7	-07:47	25.58	-2.72	1.24	2
497	103	18:39.2	-06:37	25.65	-0.31	0.027	6
498		18:40.0	-06:39	25.71	-0.5	0.004	5
499		18:40.7	-06:27	25.97	-0.56	0.05	4
500		18:16.6	-03:19	25.98	6.2	0.004	5
501		18:17.6	-03:19	26.1	5.98	0.022	5
502		18:07.5	-01:52	26.21	8.9	0.005	6
503		18:29.1	-04:38	26.26	2.83	0.008	6
504		18:18.6	-03:09	26.36	5.84	0.002	5
505		18:19.6	-03:14	26.41	5.58	0.007	5
506	105	18:47.7	-06:52	26.4	-2.29	0.001	4
507		18:15.0	-02:37	26.41	6.89	0.016	5
508		18:09.6	-01:39	26.63	8.53	0.036	3
509	118; 117	18:53.7	-07:18	26.68	-3.82	0.003	6
510		18:14.6	-02:14	26.71	7.15	0.05	5
511		18:25.6	-03:38	26.74	4.06	0.812	3
512	116	18:53.2	-07:06	26.8	-3.62	0.066	3
513		18:10.6	-01:33	26.84	8.36	0.127	6
514	114	18:52.9	-06:56	26.92	-3.48	0.005	5
515		18:37.7	-04:57	26.95	0.8	8.44	3
516		18:51.4	-06:36	27.04	-3	0.027	4
517		18:45.2	-05:37	27.22	-1.17	0.265	1
518	115	18:53.2	-06:36	27.25	-3.39	0.003	5
519		18:12.6	-01:09	27.44	8.1	0.138	4
520		18:21.6	-02:19	27.46	5.57	0.097	5
521		18:52.5	-05:54	27.79	-2.92	0.014	5
522	320	18:51.7	-05:46	27.82	-2.68	0.176	4
523		18:49.2	-05:27	27.83	-1.98	0.061	4
524		18:45.7	-04:57	27.87	-0.97	0.59	1
525		18:38.6	-03:57	27.95	1.04	2.16	2
526		18:26.6	-02:18	28.04	4.46	0.905	3
527		18:46.5	-04:47	28.11	-1.07	0.005	4
528		18:47.1	-04:47	28.19	-1.23	0.267	3
529		18:45.6	-04:27	28.32	-0.74	0.258	2
530	107; 106; 110	18:49.7	-04:47	28.48	-1.78	0.124	6
531	133	19:06.1	-06:50	28.49	-6.36	0.005	6
532	104	18:47.1	-04:22	28.56	-1.03	0.016	5
533		18:23.6	-01:18	28.58	5.59	0.022	4
534	111; 108; 119A; 117A; 323; 325	18:52.7	-04:56	28.67	-2.52	3.185	3
535		18:37.1	-02:53	28.73	1.86	0.029	1
536		18:34.6	-02:33	28.75	2.58	0.253	3
537		18:22.6	-00:58	28.76	5.97	0.534	1
538		18:36.6	-02:47	28.76	2.02	0.133	4
539		18:24.0	-01:04	28.83	5.61	0.022	6
540		19:06.1	-06:25	28.86	-6.17	0.113	3
541		18:36.3	-02:27	29.02	2.24	0.043	4
542	130	19:01.7	-05:36	29.11	-4.82	0.075	3
543	134	19:06.7	-06:10	29.15	-6.19	0.007	6
544	127	19:01.6	-05:26	29.24	-4.72	0.007	5
546		18:57.6	-04:46	29.38	-3.53	0.007	4
547		18:50.6	-03:51	29.41	-1.58	2.3	4
548	113	18:49.6	-03:42	29.44	-1.28	1	5
549	129	19:02.2	-05:16	29.46	-4.78	0.006	5
550		19:07.7	-05:45	29.64	-6.22	3.11	1
551	123	18:57.8	-04:26	29.71	-3.44	0.002	5
552	327	19:04.4	-05:15	29.71	-5.26	0.032	3
553		19:03.2	-05:06	29.72	-4.92	0.02	3
554		19:08.1	-05:40	29.76	-6.27	0.029	3
555	316	18:41.5	-02:17	29.77	1.17	0.008	4
556	126	18:59.1	-04:31	29.79	-3.77	0.13	4
557		18:38.6	-01:47	29.88	2.04	0.181	6
558		18:37.6	-01:37	29.91	2.34	0.432	3
559		18:32.6	-00:58	29.92	3.75	17	4
560		18:41.6	-01:57	30.07	1.3	0.043	3
561	121; 120; 119	18:57.6	-03:56	30.13	-3.17	1.55	2
562	131	19:02.6	-04:31	30.19	-4.54	0.02	5
563		18:39.6	-01:32	30.21	1.93	2.5	1
564		18:37.6	-01:12	30.28	2.53	0.208	5
565		18:55.6	-03:31	30.28	-2.53	1.37	2
566		18:50.6	-02:46	30.37	-1.08	0.05	5
567	132; 328	19:04.1	-04:28	30.39	-4.86	0.024	6
568	324	18:59.4	-03:46	30.49	-3.49	0.01	3
569		18:18.5	01:31	30.52	8.01	31	2
570		18:26.6	-00:28	30.56	5.78	0.066	6
571		18:30.6	00:02	30.58	4.66	0.142	3
572		18:30.6	00:02	30.58	4.66	14	4
573		18:28.6	-00:23	30.72	5.3	0.026	3
574		19:07.1	-04:25	30.77	-5.5	0.061	4
575		18:28.1	-00:38	30.88	5.52	0.078	3
576		18:31.5	-00:23	31.05	4.65	0.005	5
577		19:05.6	-03:55	31.05	-4.94	0.784	3
578		18:31.2	-00:30	31.12	4.77	0.008	5
579		18:55.6	-02:26	31.24	-2.04	1.71	3
580		19:08.6	-04:05	31.24	-5.68	0.041	4
581	136; 135	19:07.4	-03:55	31.26	-5.34	0.072	6
582		18:52.6	-01:56	31.34	-1.14	0.283	5
583		18:33.6	00:37	31.44	4.26	0.084	5
584		18:56.6	-02:16	31.5	-2.18	0.077	4
585		18:23.5	02:02	31.55	7.13	1.32	1
586		18:39.1	00:03	31.56	2.77	0.034	3
587		18:39.6	00:03	31.62	2.66	0.093	5
588		18:36.1	-00:27	31.66	3.67	0.034	6
589		18:52.6	-01:26	31.78	-0.91	1.68	2
590	326	19:06.6	-03:00	31.98	-4.75	10	2
591		18:36.6	-00:47	32.01	3.71	0.33	3
592		18:28.5	02:02	32.13	6.02	0.011	4
593		18:39.6	-00:37	32.21	2.97	0.462	3
594		19:00.6	-01:46	32.41	-2.84	0.005	3
595		19:45.7	-07:23	32.44	-15.4	0.052	3
596		18:48.2	00:13	32.76	0.83	0.061	4
597		18:50.8	00:05	32.92	0.19	0.018	5
598		18:46.7	00:43	33.04	1.37	0.001	5
599		18:51.6	00:09	33.07	0.04	0.022	4
600		18:30.5	02:52	33.11	5.96	0.029	4
601		18:46.7	00:48	33.11	1.41	0.001	5
602		18:51.6	-00:04	33.12	0.06	0.003	4
603		18:46.3	00:53	33.14	1.54	0.004	6
604		18:51.6	00:14	33.15	0.08	0.152	5
605		18:46.7	00:53	33.19	1.45	0.002	5
606		18:51.6	-00:11	33.22	0.12	0.002	4
607		18:48.1	-00:42	33.26	1.12	0.147	2
608		18:51.6	-00:26	33.44	0.23	0.004	4
609		18:51.6	-00:31	33.52	0.27	0.003	4
610		18:49.6	-00:52	33.58	0.87	0.129	2
611		18:55.7	-00:16	33.77	-0.76	0.015	5
612		18:56.0	-00:26	33.95	-0.75	0.003	4
614		18:56.8	-00:21	33.97	-0.96	0.032	4
615		19:19.6	-02:04	34.3	-7.21	1.35	3
616		18:47.5	02:03	34.32	1.81	2.39	2
617		18:57.5	01:04	34.58	-0.87	0.745	5
618	137	19:15.6	-01:15	34.58	-5.94	0.018	3
619	139	19:18.1	-01:28	34.68	-6.59	0.016	5
620		19:20.6	-01:09	35.23	-7.01	0.018	3
621		18:47.5	03:13	35.35	2.34	45	3
622		19:11.6	-00:20	35.68	-4.25	0.297	3
623		19:54.6	-04:52	35.81	-16.27	3.19	3
624		19:05.5	01:35	35.94	-2.41	0.486	1
625		19:06.5	01:35	36.06	-2.64	0.002	3
626		19:06.5	01:40	36.13	-2.6	0.003	3
627	138	19:14.0	00:50	36.26	-4.65	2.99	2
628		18:58.5	03:26	36.79	0	2	4
629		19:17.5	01:05	36.89	-5.3	0.392	3
630		18:38.9	06:03	36.91	5.52	0.301	1
631	329	19:12.5	02:35	37.64	-3.5	0.02	2
632	141	19:20.5	01:36	37.69	-5.74	0.765	1
633		18:40.9	07:03	38.03	5.53	0.075	2
634		18:41.4	07:33	38.53	5.65	0.059	2
635		19:09.5	04:08	38.67	-2.12	0.001	5
636		19:06.5	04:40	38.79	-1.21	0.22	5
637		18:41.4	08:13	39.13	5.95	0.03	3
638		18:50.4	07:19	39.33	3.55	20	2
639		19:12.5	05:05	39.86	-2.34	1.37	2
640		19:22.5	04:06	40.14	-5.01	1.62	1
641		19:16.5	05:05	40.32	-3.22	0.38	1
642	140	19:19.5	05:06	40.68	-3.88	0.554	3
643		19:24.1	04:50	40.98	-5.02	0.015	5
644		19:19.4	06:36	42	-3.18	2.34	2
645		19:19.4	07:21	42.66	-2.82	5	1
646		19:14.4	08:05	42.75	-1.38	2.52	2
647	330	19:19.9	07:31	42.87	-2.85	0.206	4
648		18:39.3	12:43	42.96	8.41	0.011	6
649		19:12.4	08:40	43.03	-0.67	23	2
650		18:39.8	13:03	43.32	8.45	0.05	4
651		19:19.4	08:06	43.33	-2.47	0.025	4
652		19:18.4	08:26	43.5	-2.09	0.217	2
653		18:42.3	13:03	43.59	7.9	0.643	2
654	331; 332	19:29.4	07:06	43.62	-5.13	4.56	1
655		19:20.3	08:33	43.83	-2.45	0.02	5
656		19:21.3	08:28	43.87	-2.71	0.001	5
657		19:21.4	08:54	44.27	-2.53	0.075	5
658		19:20.9	09:06	44.38	-2.33	0.016	4
659		18:41.3	14:03	44.39	8.56	1.46	3
660		18:37.3	14:33	44.41	9.65	2.28	1
661		19:21.8	09:06	44.49	-2.52	0.008	4
662		18:57.3	12:24	44.65	4.34	0.416	1
663	335	19:36.9	07:34	44.91	-6.54	0.005	6
664		19:20.9	09:46	44.97	-2.01	0.183	4
665		18:39.8	14:53	44.99	9.26	0.077	3
666		18:40.8	15:03	45.25	9.11	0.131	4
667		19:05.3	12:05	45.25	2.45	2.63	3
668	338	19:43.4	07:22	45.53	-8.05	0.037	3
669	128	19:02.3	12:49	45.58	3.44	1.28	4
670		19:42.4	07:37	45.62	-7.71	0.168	2
671		19:37.4	08:27	45.75	-6.23	0.102	2
672		19:47.4	07:07	45.79	-9.04	0.687	1
673		19:20.9	11:16	46.29	-1.3	0.199	6
674		19:28.4	10:26	46.44	-3.32	0.458	1
675		19:24.0	11:06	46.51	-2.05	0.003	6
676		19:21.5	11:31	46.6	-1.33	0.006	6
677		19:22.3	11:34	46.73	-1.48	0.006	6
678		19:44.4	08:37	46.75	-7.66	0.05	4
679		19:13.3	12:45	46.75	1.03	0.936	3
680		19:44.7	08:38	46.8	-7.71	0.007	5
682	333	19:28.9	10:56	46.94	-3.18	0.052	3
683		19:21.3	11:56	46.94	-1.09	0.104	3
684		19:21.8	12:26	47.44	-0.96	0.185	5
685		19:29.9	11:26	47.49	-3.16	0.037	2
686		19:23.3	12:26	47.61	-1.28	0.009	4
687		19:38.6	10:25	47.63	-5.53	0.006	5
688	142	19:38.8	10:29	47.71	-5.54	0.016	5
689		19:40.4	10:17	47.73	-5.98	0.057	4
690		19:40.7	10:20	47.81	-6.02	0.035	3
691		19:29.3	11:56	47.87	-2.81	0.063	2
692		19:22.3	12:56	47.94	-0.83	0.05	4
693		19:10.3	14:30	47.96	2.49	17	2
694	143	19:40.7	10:57	48.35	-5.72	0.109	6
695		19:44.4	10:27	48.36	-6.76	0.351	1
696		19:29.3	12:36	48.46	-2.49	0.019	2
697		19:02.3	16:04	48.48	4.93	0.561	2
698		19:26.1	13:06	48.52	-1.57	0.012	6
699		19:29.3	12:46	48.61	-2.41	0.02	2
700		19:41.3	11:15	48.68	-5.7	0.005	4
701	334	19:34.9	12:17	48.83	-3.85	0.016	4
702	336	19:36.4	12:17	49.01	-4.17	0.005	5
703		19:47.6	10:50	49.09	-7.25	0.02	2
704		19:26.8	13:46	49.19	-1.4	0.097	6
705	337	19:36.8	12:27	49.2	-4.17	0.086	4
706		18:20.1	21:45	49.41	16.36	0.008	4
707	340	19:48.7	11:28	49.76	-7.18	0.024	5
708		19:02.2	17:34	49.82	5.61	0.02	3
709		19:14.3	16:25	50.11	2.53	0.002	6
710		19:02.2	18:04	50.27	5.84	0.045	3
711		19:02.2	18:04	50.27	5.84	6	1
712		18:59.2	18:34	50.4	6.7	0.865	2
713		19:12.2	17:05	50.48	3.26	4	3
714		19:12.2	17:55	51.22	3.65	0.009	4
715		19:05.2	19:05	51.49	5.66	0.115	3
716		19:23.2	17:06	51.72	0.94	14	4
717		19:16.2	18:00	51.73	2.84	0.147	5
718		19:12.2	18:35	51.81	3.96	0.524	4
719		19:03.2	19:44	51.87	6.38	0.088	2
720		19:37.3	15:27	51.88	-2.81	7	2
721		19:31.3	16:41	52.27	-0.94	19	3
722		19:24.2	18:26	53	1.37	0.023	5
723		19:18.2	19:14	53.03	3	0.01	5
724		19:12.2	20:05	53.14	4.65	6	2
725		19:28.2	18:10	53.22	0.4	0.005	5
726		19:46.3	15:57	53.4	-4.44	0.03	1
727		19:31.2	18:16	53.65	-0.17	0.018	4
728		19:09.2	21:05	53.71	5.73	1	1
729		19:40.3	17:17	53.85	-2.55	0.023	5
730		19:20.2	19:56	53.87	2.91	0.023	5
731		19:38.2	17:37	53.89	-1.95	0.27	4
732		19:19.7	20:11	54.04	3.13	0.018	5
733		19:44.3	17:07	54.17	-3.44	0.398	2
734		19:08.1	22:05	54.5	6.4	0.66	2
735		19:22.2	20:26	54.54	2.73	0.019	5
736		19:14.1	21:35	54.69	4.93	0.66	2
737		19:40.2	18:17	54.7	-2.03	0.077	4
738		19:21.2	20:56	54.87	3.17	0.062	2
739		19:24.2	20:36	54.91	2.4	0.384	3
740		19:28.2	20:06	54.92	1.33	3.8	2
741		19:21.2	21:06	55.01	3.25	7	4
742		19:33.2	19:37	55.05	0.06	0.047	4
743		19:38.4	18:57	55.07	-1.33	0.014	4
744		19:19.4	21:26	55.12	3.76	0.027	4
745		19:48.2	17:48	55.23	-3.93	0.49	2
746		19:22.2	21:18	55.3	3.14	0.035	4
747		19:41.2	18:52	55.33	-1.95	0.017	4
748		19:25.2	21:06	55.46	2.43	0.57	2
750		19:18.1	22:06	55.57	4.34	8	2
751		19:21.0	21:45	55.58	3.58	0.003	4
752		19:38.9	19:32	55.64	-1.15	0.012	4
753		19:48.2	18:18	55.66	-3.68	0.005	5
754		19:47.2	18:42	55.9	-3.26	0.008	4
755		19:27.2	21:26	55.97	2.18	0.167	3
756		19:27.7	21:26	56.03	2.08	0.007	4
757		19:42.2	19:34	56.05	-1.81	0.033	4
758		19:46.7	18:57	56.05	-3.03	0.029	5
759		19:10.1	24:05	56.5	6.89	0.358	1
760		19:30.2	21:51	56.68	1.77	0.01	3
761		19:36.2	21:07	56.7	0.18	0.116	5
762		19:19.9	23:11	56.73	4.48	0.01	4
763		19:18.6	23:26	56.81	4.86	0.008	6
764		19:19.1	23:26	56.86	4.76	0.079	3
765		19:44.2	20:17	56.91	-1.85	0.04	4
766		19:49.2	19:38	56.93	-3.21	1.04	2
767		19:25.1	22:46	56.93	3.22	0.201	3
768		19:28.1	22:36	57.11	2.54	0.111	4
769		19:24.1	23:06	57.11	3.59	0.016	6
770		19:32.1	22:06	57.12	1.49	0.344	2
771		19:20.7	23:32	57.12	4.48	0.005	6
772		19:25.1	23:06	57.22	3.38	0.068	4
773		19:22.5	23:26	57.23	4.07	0.004	4
774		19:22.9	23:26	57.27	3.99	0.002	5
775		19:23.6	23:26	57.35	3.85	0.025	4
776		19:35.1	22:07	57.46	0.88	0.529	2
777		19:12.1	25:05	57.61	6.94	0.226	1
778		19:27.1	23:41	57.95	3.26	0.043	6
779		19:30.1	23:21	57.99	2.49	0.14	3
780		19:14.1	25:25	58.12	6.69	0.127	2
781		19:28.1	23:46	58.14	3.1	0.047	3
782		19:28.1	23:56	58.28	3.18	0.01	5
783		19:27.1	24:06	58.32	3.46	0.05	3
784		19:29.1	24:06	58.54	3.06	0.391	2
785		19:34.1	24:07	59.09	2.06	0.007	3
786		19:31.6	24:26	59.11	2.72	0.038	3
787		19:53.2	22:08	59.56	-2.73	24	2
788		19:33.6	24:47	59.62	2.48	0.007	3
789		19:49.6	23:38	60.43	-1.26	0.014	3
790		19:35.1	25:42	60.59	2.63	0.005	4
791		19:49.6	23:58	60.72	-1.09	0.095	4
792		19:37.1	25:42	60.81	2.24	0.145	4
793		19:39.6	25:27	60.87	1.63	0.066	3
794		19:37.1	26:37	61.61	2.69	0.278	1
795		19:37.1	26:37	61.61	2.69	0.278	1
796		19:44.1	26:22	62.17	1.21	0.014	4
797		20:05.6	23:29	62.22	-4.48	0.013	3
798		19:47.1	26:07	62.29	0.5	2.5	3
799		19:42.6	26:57	62.5	1.79	0.026	4
800		19:44.1	26:47	62.53	1.42	0.036	4
801		20:03.4	24:19	62.65	-3.61	0.041	3
802		19:59.7	24:58	62.77	-2.54	0.005	4
803		19:42.3	27:17	62.77	1.99	0.019	4
804		19:42.8	27:15	62.8	1.88	0.018	4
805		20:01.6	24:45	62.81	-3.02	0.005	4
806		19:44.4	27:07	62.85	1.52	0.006	4
807		19:43.6	27:22	62.99	1.79	0.025	4
808		19:45.0	27:17	63.07	1.47	0.014	4
809		20:04.1	25:09	63.44	-3.3	2.2	1
810		19:45.0	27:57	63.65	1.81	0.047	4
811		19:40.0	28:52	63.89	3.22	0.253	1
812		19:45.0	28:32	64.15	2.1	0.145	3
813		19:43.0	29:07	64.44	2.78	0.224	3
814		20:04.1	26:44	64.78	-2.45	0.032	3
815		19:47.0	29:07	64.88	2.02	2.32	3
816		19:36.0	30:32	64.92	4.8	0.025	1
818		20:17.1	26:09	65.89	-5.2	10	1
819		19:48.0	30:23	66.07	2.47	0.118	2
820		19:45.0	30:57	66.24	3.32	0.378	3
821		19:37.1	32:27	66.73	5.51	0.007	3
822		19:46.9	32:07	67.47	3.54	2.41	1
823		20:09.0	30:09	68.25	-1.52	1.44	2
824		20:16.0	29:24	68.47	-3.2	0.212	4
825		19:51.9	33:08	68.87	3.14	2.05	3
826		19:48.9	33:33	68.91	3.89	0.055	3
827		20:18.0	29:42	68.96	-3.4	0.055	4
828		19:50.9	33:33	69.12	3.53	0.019	3
829		19:53.2	33:27	69.28	3.07	0.011	4
830		19:51.9	33:47	69.43	3.47	0.015	3
831		19:53.9	33:43	69.59	3.08	0.012	4
832		19:54.9	33:46	69.74	2.93	0.022	4
833		19:54.9	33:48	69.77	2.95	1.5	2
834		19:53.9	34:24	70.17	3.44	0.015	4
835		19:53.4	34:41	70.36	3.67	0.014	3
836		19:53.4	34:43	70.39	3.69	0.012	4
837		20:23.9	30:47	70.57	-3.84	0.008	4
838		20:24.0	30:47	70.58	-3.85	0.008	4
839		19:59.9	34:08	70.59	2.24	1.4	1
840		19:54.3	35:08	70.84	3.75	0.11	3
841		20:11.0	33:09	70.99	-0.23	30	3
842		20:20.0	32:00	71.09	-2.46	0.016	4
843		20:20.7	31:56	71.12	-2.62	0.007	4
844		20:30.4	30:40	71.29	-5.04	0.02	3
845		20:05.0	34:22	71.34	1.46	0.2	2
846		20:42.1	29:11	71.6	-7.96	3	1
847	341	20:01.9	35:08	71.66	2.42	3	3
848		20:05.3	34:52	71.8	1.68	0.011	4
849		20:04.6	35:07	71.93	1.94	0.011	4
850		20:11.9	34:09	71.94	0.15	0.8	1
851		20:30.3	31:40	72.09	-4.44	0.02	3
852		20:05.9	35:09	72.1	1.73	0.03	3
853	147	20:06.9	35:14	72.28	1.6	0.002	5
854		19:57.8	36:23	72.29	3.77	0.108	2
855		19:58.5	36:23	72.37	3.65	0.008	3
856		20:08.2	35:11	72.39	1.35	0.015	3
857	144	20:01.9	36:08	72.51	2.95	0.8	1
858		20:11.1	34:57	72.52	0.73	0.2	4
859		20:31.4	32:20	72.77	-4.23	0.015	4
860	146	20:04.9	36:04	72.76	2.4	0.001	6
861		20:00.4	36:46	72.9	3.53	0.005	3
862		20:06.8	36:59	73.75	2.55	0.8	1
863		20:07.7	37:07	73.96	2.47	0.005	4
864		20:42.0	32:11	73.99	-6.12	5	3
865	145	20:04.2	37:47	74.15	3.42	0.075	4
866		20:07.1	37:47	74.46	2.94	0.172	3
867		19:59.9	38:43	74.51	4.64	0.011	3
868		20:47.0	32:11	74.65	-6.96	0.654	2
869		19:59.8	39:28	75.14	5.05	0.034	1
870		20:37.0	35:11	75.74	-3.47	25	2
871		20:05.8	39:49	76.04	4.25	0.068	2
872		20:01.7	40:28	76.19	5.25	0.083	1
873		20:41.0	35:11	76.24	-4.12	0.98	1
874		20:42.0	35:11	76.37	-4.28	0.98	1
875		20:07.8	39:59	76.38	4.01	0.004	3
876		20:09.3	39:54	76.47	3.73	0.029	3
877		20:14.3	39:54	77	2.93	0.007	6
878		20:08.8	40:40	77.06	4.23	0.003	4
879		20:20.8	39:20	77.23	1.56	0.004	5
880	343	20:13.8	40:19	77.3	3.24	0.015	5
881		20:17.8	39:49	77.31	2.32	0.005	6
882		20:19.3	39:39	77.34	1.99	0.002	5
883		20:19.8	39:40	77.39	1.91	0.003	5
884		20:05.7	41:29	77.45	5.14	1.23	2
886		20:18.8	39:59	77.56	2.26	1.05	2
887		20:03.7	42:29	78.1	5.99	0.019	4
888	344	20:18.8	40:39	78.11	2.64	4.46	3
889		20:24.8	40:10	78.35	1.41	0.8	4
890		20:03.7	42:54	78.45	6.21	0.054	3
891		20:13.7	41:59	78.69	4.16	0.011	4
892		20:15.7	41:49	78.75	3.76	0.054	4
893		20:12.7	42:14	78.79	4.45	0.034	3
894		20:15.7	41:54	78.82	3.81	0.004	4
895		20:15.7	42:39	79.45	4.22	5.64	2
896		20:41.9	39:41	79.91	-1.5	0.028	5
897		20:24.7	42:10	79.98	2.57	0.111	4
898		20:41.9	39:51	80.04	-1.4	0.07	4
899		20:23.7	42:40	80.29	3.01	0.018	4
900		20:24.7	42:45	80.46	2.91	0.016	4
901		20:21.5	43:20	80.6	3.72	0.006	4
902		20:21.7	43:20	80.62	3.69	0.001	5
903		20:08.6	45:04	80.78	6.61	0.005	5
904		20:52.9	39:11	80.87	-3.47	8	1
905		20:09.6	45:19	81.09	6.59	0.018	4
906	348; 346; 349	20:36.8	42:11	81.31	0.78	15.78	3
907		20:45.2	41:01	81.36	-1.18	0.047	3
908		20:19.6	45:10	81.93	5.03	0.366	3
909		20:19.6	45:10	81.93	5.03	3.84	3
910		20:19.6	45:20	82.07	5.13	0.011	4
911		20:40.8	42:56	82.35	0.65	0.013	4
912		21:08.0	38:42	82.42	-6	0.8	1
913		20:24.3	45:20	82.53	4.46	0.011	4
914		20:51.8	41:41	82.66	-1.72	5.21	3
915		20:45.4	43:06	83.01	0.09	0.007	6
916		20:57.9	41:12	83.01	-2.9	1.44	2
917		20:40.2	44:09	83.26	1.47	0.001	6
918		20:40.9	44:06	83.29	1.34	0.004	6
919		20:32.7	45:17	83.36	3.23	0.001	5
920		20:32.7	45:20	83.4	3.26	0.001	5
921		20:33.2	45:16	83.4	3.15	0.002	5
922		20:38.7	44:36	83.45	1.96	0.005	6
923		20:34.7	45:10	83.48	2.88	0.054	3
925		20:33.7	45:20	83.51	3.12	0.002	5
926		20:35.4	45:19	83.67	2.87	0.002	5
927		21:03.9	41:06	83.69	-3.82	0.025	4
928		20:41.0	44:36	83.7	1.63	0.003	6
929		20:35.7	45:20	83.72	2.84	0.002	5
930		20:36.9	45:21	83.85	2.67	0.002	5
931		20:47.8	43:51	83.87	0.23	0.013	5
932		21:05.9	41:52	84.51	-3.58	0.004	4
933		20:52.8	44:11	84.7	-0.26	0.132	1
934		21:07.1	42:07	84.85	-3.58	0.011	4
935	152	20:56.8	43:52	84.91	-1.02	2.25	4
936		20:51.7	45:11	85.35	0.52	0.914	2
937		21:09.9	42:27	85.45	-3.74	8.13	3
938		21:08.9	42:42	85.5	-3.43	0.316	3
939		20:31.1	48:10	85.54	5.15	20	1
940		20:53.7	45:35	85.88	0.51	0.151	2
941	153	20:56.7	45:50	86.4	0.26	0.105	5
942		21:16.4	43:13	86.82	-4.08	0.006	5
943		21:16.7	43:24	86.99	-4	0.009	3
944		21:17.7	43:18	87.04	-4.2	0.002	6
945		20:57.7	46:32	87.04	0.59	0.16	2
946		21:19.0	43:28	87.33	-4.25	0.001	5
947		21:20.0	43:19	87.35	-4.48	0.008	5
948		21:20.7	43:15	87.4	-4.62	0.001	5
949		21:19.4	43:32	87.43	-4.25	0.014	5
950	356	21:00.5	46:37	87.42	0.28	0.112	5
951		21:21.1	43:19	87.49	-4.63	0.005	6
952		21:20.5	43:28	87.52	-4.44	0.001	5
953		21:21.4	43:23	87.58	-4.62	0.001	6
955		20:57.7	47:52	88.05	1.47	0.081	3
956		21:11.6	45:58	88.23	-1.56	0.003	5
957		21:00.7	47:47	88.32	1.03	0.256	1
958		20:59.0	48:07	88.38	1.47	0.012	5
959		21:11.8	46:32	88.67	-1.2	0.079	1
960		21:08.5	47:10	88.75	-0.36	0.003	5
961		21:08.8	47:14	88.84	-0.36	0.006	5
962		21:01.7	48:22	88.87	1.29	0.666	2
963		21:13.8	46:32	88.91	-1.45	0.104	3
964		21:09.5	47:22	89.02	-0.35	0.006	5
965		21:19.8	45:53	89.16	-2.66	0.43	3
966		21:00.2	49:02	89.2	1.92	0.172	4
967		21:10.2	47:34	89.24	-0.3	0.156	3
968		21:22.5	45:33	89.26	-3.23	0.014	2
969		21:33.9	43:35	89.37	-6.04	0.018	3
970	361	21:12.8	47:22	89.39	-0.75	0.123	4
971		21:00.8	49:19	89.49	2.02	0.01	5
972		21:21.3	46:08	89.52	-2.67	0.05	4
973	159	21:37.4	43:14	89.6	-6.74	0.029	5
974		21:19.3	46:38	89.63	-2.07	0.192	4
975		21:11.7	47:52	89.64	-0.28	0.075	5
976		21:24.1	46:01	89.79	-3.09	0	2
977		21:39.0	43:14	89.8	-6.93	0.034	4
978		21:01.1	49:42	89.81	2.24	0.2	5
979		21:39.5	43:22	89.96	-6.89	0.002	5
980		21:24.8	46:13	90.02	-3.03	0	1
981		20:59.6	50:12	90.03	2.75	0.033	6
982		21:02.4	49:55	90.11	2.23	0.019	5
983	156; 155	21:32.4	45:03	90.17	-4.78	0.068	3
984		21:01.6	50:12	90.24	2.51	0.056	4
985		20:59.1	50:35	90.26	3.06	0.033	4
986		21:32.4	45:13	90.28	-4.66	0.079	2
987		21:00.8	50:41	90.52	2.93	0.009	5
988		21:04.6	50:12	90.56	2.15	0.21	1
989		21:21.8	47:33	90.58	-1.72	1.4	3
990		20:58.9	51:17	90.77	3.55	0.051	5
991		21:02.3	50:53	90.82	2.88	0.016	5
992		20:54.5	52:01	90.9	4.55	0.08	3
993		21:26.6	47:25	91.07	-2.38	0.001	4
994		21:26.0	47:39	91.16	-2.14	0.009	3
995		21:26.7	47:31	91.15	-2.32	0.001	4
996		20:57.5	51:57	91.14	4.14	0.08	5
997		21:26.6	47:41	91.26	-2.19	0.001	5
998		21:04.1	51:12	91.25	2.88	0.172	4
999		21:07.6	50:42	91.25	2.14	7.2	1
1000		21:06.6	50:52	91.27	2.37	0.255	1
1001		21:27.3	47:41	91.34	-2.27	0.001	5
1002		20:56.5	52:42	91.61	4.74	1.97	2
1003		20:59.5	52:22	91.66	4.18	0.079	5
1004		21:01.5	52:22	91.86	3.95	0.174	4
1005		21:13.7	50:42	91.91	1.44	7	3
1006		21:31.3	47:48	91.91	-2.65	0.039	3
1007	363	21:25.3	48:53	91.93	-1.17	0.153	3
1008		21:26.8	49:03	92.22	-1.22	0.013	5
1009		21:33.8	47:53	92.28	-2.87	0.061	4
1010		21:38.9	47:04	92.36	-4.06	0.182	4
1011		21:06.6	52:22	92.38	3.38	0.078	4
1012		21:34.1	48:06	92.47	-2.74	0.021	4
1013		21:00.5	53:22	92.51	4.72	0.048	5
1014		21:24.0	50:00	92.57	-0.23	0.004	6
1015		21:00.5	53:32	92.64	4.83	0.049	5
1016		21:19.8	51:01	92.8	0.96	0.003	5
1017	362	21:25.3	50:10	92.83	-0.26	0.027	5
1018		21:04.5	53:17	92.85	4.22	0.016	5
1019		21:21.0	50:57	92.89	0.78	0.003	5
1020		21:42.9	47:14	92.98	-4.38	0.136	3
1021		21:21.6	51:02	93.01	0.77	0.001	6
1023		20:58.5	54:22	93.08	5.6	0.28	2
1024		21:42.3	47:32	93.1	-4.09	0.011	5
1026		21:01.5	54:02	93.11	5.05	0.048	5
1027		21:06.5	53:22	93.12	4.05	0.026	5
1028		21:05.5	53:32	93.14	4.28	0.055	4
1029		21:01.5	54:12	93.24	5.16	10	3
1030		21:46.5	47:06	93.37	-4.88	0.031	4
1031		21:45.9	47:14	93.37	-4.71	0.02	5
1032		21:03.5	54:07	93.37	4.89	0.043	4
1033		20:37.2	57:11	93.44	9.69	0.714	3
1034		21:05.5	54:02	93.51	4.61	0.045	4
1035		21:44.7	47:44	93.54	-4.2	0.109	5
1036		20:38.2	57:11	93.52	9.58	0.088	5
1037		20:54.4	55:26	93.53	6.75	0.591	3
1038		20:46.3	56:21	93.53	8.2	0.66	2
1039		20:42.3	56:51	93.58	8.94	0.079	4
1040		21:46.6	47:44	93.79	-4.4	0.016	4
1041		20:38.2	57:31	93.79	9.78	0.022	5
1042		21:49.2	47:24	93.92	-4.94	0.015	5
1043		21:39.8	49:14	93.92	-2.54	1.148	2
1044		20:41.2	57:21	93.9	9.35	0.006	5
1045		21:48.4	47:39	93.97	-4.66	0.018	4
1046		21:43.3	48:44	94.03	-3.3	0.088	3
1047		21:48.1	47:52	94.07	-4.46	0.005	5
1048		21:35.3	50:20	94.11	-1.22	0.069	3
1049		20:42.2	57:31	94.12	9.35	0.005	6
1050		21:05.5	54:52	94.13	5.17	0.09	4
1051		20:42.7	57:31	94.16	9.29	0.01	5
1052		21:47.9	48:08	94.21	-4.24	0.018	5
1053	357	20:59.4	55:42	94.18	6.37	0.033	5
1054		21:34.8	50:43	94.31	-0.88	6	2
1055	168	21:53.2	47:12	94.32	-5.53	0.199	3
1056		20:58.4	56:02	94.35	6.69	0.036	2
1057		21:43.8	49:34	94.63	-2.71	0.053	4
1058		21:02.4	56:02	94.72	6.27	0.869	3
1059		21:40.8	50:44	95.02	-1.51	0.059	3
1060		21:11.5	55:17	95.02	4.82	0.031	4
1061	354	20:58.3	57:22	95.36	7.56	0.618	2
1062		21:13.5	55:32	95.4	4.79	0.003	5
1063	360	21:07.4	56:22	95.44	5.97	0.025	5
1064		21:13.5	55:37	95.46	4.85	0.001	5
1065	151	21:07.4	56:32	95.56	6.09	0.023	5
1066		21:47.8	50:44	95.87	-2.23	0.208	3
1067		21:09.4	56:42	95.87	6	0.012	5
1068	359	21:06.3	57:07	95.89	6.59	0.027	5
1069		21:08.4	56:52	95.9	6.21	0.018	4
1070	164	21:46.8	51:04	95.96	-1.87	0.05	5
1071		20:58.3	58:12	96	8.1	0.092	5
1072		21:16.5	56:13	96.18	4.95	1.51	2
1073		21:48.3	51:24	96.36	-1.77	0.162	2
1074	364	21:34.7	53:53	96.43	1.47	0.027	5
1075	157	21:31.6	54:23	96.44	2.14	0.145	4
1076	149; 148	20:49.3	59:51	96.57	10.04	0.008	5
1077		21:37.7	53:44	96.65	1.05	0.002	5
1078		21:36.7	54:04	96.76	1.4	0.018	5
1079		21:32.6	54:43	96.77	2.28	0.011	5
1080	154	21:21.5	56:33	96.91	4.69	0.001	5
1081		21:36.6	54:24	96.98	1.64	0.584	2
1082	150	20:51.1	60:11	96.98	10.07	0.111	5
1083		21:33.6	55:58	97.72	3.11	0.761	3
1084		21:41.7	54:54	97.86	1.54	0.099	4
1085		21:33.5	56:45	98.25	3.69	0.01	4
1086		21:28.5	57:33	98.3	4.74	0.095	4
1087		21:35.6	56:33	98.32	3.35	0.013	5
1088	160	21:38.6	56:14	98.41	2.83	0.019	4
1089		20:32.8	63:30	98.4	13.78	0.244	3
1090	365	21:35.6	56:43	98.43	3.48	0.028	4
1092		21:37.6	56:59	98.81	3.48	0.014	3
1093		21:33.5	57:38	98.85	4.34	0.034	4
1094		20:32.8	64:00	98.83	14.06	0.002	5
1095	162	21:42.6	56:19	98.89	2.52	0.012	4
1096		21:31.5	58:03	98.93	4.83	0.001	3
1097		21:46.7	55:44	98.94	1.72	0.003	4
1098		21:34.5	57:38	98.95	4.25	0.025	3
1099		21:36.5	57:24	98.98	3.88	0.008	5
1100		20:34.8	64:00	98.96	13.88	0.007	5
1101		21:39.6	56:59	99.01	3.3	0.095	3
1102		21:32.5	58:03	99.03	4.74	0.008	5
1103	161	21:41.7	56:44	99.07	2.92	0.003	6
1104		21:42.1	56:44	99.11	2.89	0.006	4
1105		21:37.1	57:34	99.15	3.95	0.008	4
1106	163	21:42.6	56:54	99.27	2.97	0.009	4
1107		21:56.8	54:29	99.29	-0.16	11	1
1108		21:26.4	59:33	99.49	6.37	0.046	3
1109		21:51.7	55:49	99.55	1.33	0.15	2
1110		21:39.5	57:54	99.62	3.99	0.007	4
1111		21:39.5	57:54	99.62	3.99	0.002	6
1112		21:38.5	58:04	99.63	4.2	0.013	4
1113	367	21:44.6	57:12	99.67	3.02	0.002	5
1114		21:49.7	56:24	99.69	1.96	0.016	4
1115		21:46.6	56:59	99.74	2.68	0.002	5
1116		21:36.5	58:34	99.76	4.75	0.034	3
1117		21:38.5	58:19	99.79	4.39	0.004	5
1118		21:46.6	57:13	99.89	2.86	0.001	5
1119		21:13.2	61:42	99.91	9.03	0.01	5
1120		21:47.6	57:09	99.96	2.72	0.001	5
1121		21:40.5	58:17	99.97	4.19	0.008	5
1122		20:32.7	65:20	99.97	14.81	0.041	4
1123		21:39.5	58:29	100	4.43	0.003	5
1124		21:41.5	58:14	100.04	4.07	0.015	5
1125		21:14.7	61:43	100.04	8.9	0.01	5
1126		21:39.5	58:34	100.06	4.49	0.006	5
1127		21:40.9	58:34	100.2	4.37	0.004	5
1128		21:41.5	58:34	100.26	4.32	0.015	5
1129		21:46.6	57:54	100.33	3.38	0.041	3
1130		21:44.6	58:19	100.4	3.87	0.012	4
1131	366	21:40.0	59:34	100.77	5.2	0.046	3
1132		21:46.6	58:44	100.87	4.02	0.003	4
1133		22:02.7	56:15	101.02	0.72	0.248	3
1134		21:41.5	60:14	101.35	5.58	2.63	1
1135		21:39.4	60:39	101.44	6.06	0.054	3
1136		21:45.5	59:59	101.57	5.06	0.012	5
1137	368	21:51.6	59:04	101.58	3.87	0.018	5
1138		21:51.6	59:04	101.58	3.87	0.018	4
1139		21:55.6	58:34	101.68	3.15	0.015	5
1140		21:40.4	60:54	101.7	6.16	0.24	2
1141		21:55.6	58:44	101.78	3.28	0.01	4
1142		21:56.6	59:04	102.09	3.47	0.002	5
1143		21:57.6	58:59	102.14	3.32	0.02	6
1144	166; 165; 167	21:50.5	60:07	102.14	4.77	0.027	5
1145		21:31.3	62:43	102.14	8.24	0.183	3
1146		21:31.3	62:43	102.14	8.24	0.183	3
1147		20:40.5	67:21	102.14	15.29	0.127	3
1148		20:40.5	67:21	102.14	15.29	0.015	6
1149	170	21:57.6	59:07	102.22	3.43	0.015	4
1150	369	22:15.8	56:00	102.37	-0.53	0.007	3
1151	169	21:59.6	59:04	102.4	3.23	0.027	3
1152		20:34.4	68:00	102.37	16.14	0.025	5
1153	171	22:00.6	58:59	102.45	3.09	0.079	5
1154		22:16.8	56:13	102.61	-0.43	0.007	3
1155		20:43.5	67:41	102.6	15.25	0.006	6
1156		22:19.9	55:45	102.71	-1.05	0.043	2
1157		20:39.5	68:01	102.65	15.75	0.005	5
1158		20:44.5	67:41	102.66	15.17	0.111	4
1160		22:04.7	59:00	102.87	2.78	0.019	3
1161		22:19.9	56:08	102.92	-0.73	0.006	3
1162		21:20.0	65:03	102.92	10.76	0.004	3
1163		22:20.9	56:10	103.05	-0.78	0.007	2
1164	174	22:06.7	59:10	103.18	2.76	0.019	6
1165		22:07.2	59:05	103.18	2.66	0.019	6
1166	173	22:05.7	59:35	103.32	3.18	0.001	6
1167		21:03.7	67:02	103.3	13.32	0.062	2
1168		20:56.6	67:37	103.31	14.21	0.003	5
1169		22:07.2	59:45	103.57	3.2	0.004	5
1170		21:01.7	67:37	103.63	13.84	0.215	3
1171		20:53.5	68:19	103.71	14.88	0.002	5
1172		21:02.7	67:42	103.76	13.82	0.01	6
1173		21:04.7	67:42	103.88	13.67	0.006	5
1174		21:02.6	68:12	104.15	14.14	0.294	4
1175		22:13.7	60:45	104.81	3.55	0.015	3
1176		21:31.0	66:43	104.93	11.15	0.446	1
1177		21:18.8	68:16	105.22	13.06	0.005	4
1178		22:09.1	62:20	105.27	5.16	0.005	5
1179		22:27.3	59:02	105.31	1.19	0.002	5
1180		22:26.8	59:15	105.37	1.41	7	1
1181		21:42.1	66:09	105.36	9.97	0.008	4
1182		22:13.1	61:55	105.42	4.55	0.004	5
1183		21:42.1	66:14	105.42	10.03	0.09	2
1184		22:20.7	60:45	105.53	3.08	0.124	3
1185		22:29.3	59:05	105.56	1.1	0.006	6
1186		22:13.6	62:08	105.59	4.7	0.005	5
1187		22:38.0	57:16	105.62	-1.06	0.145	3
1188		22:16.7	61:45	105.67	4.18	0.398	3
1189		22:39.0	57:16	105.74	-1.12	0.473	2
1190		22:30.8	59:08	105.75	1.04	0.004	4
1191		22:14.1	62:25	105.8	4.9	0.004	5
1192		22:33.9	58:36	105.81	0.37	0.007	5
1193		22:14.6	62:25	105.85	4.87	0.002	5
1194		22:32.9	59:05	105.95	0.87	0.009	3
1195		22:26.8	61:15	106.42	3.11	0.017	5
1196		22:26.8	61:15	106.42	3.11	0.029	4
1197		22:37.9	58:56	106.43	0.4	0.009	6
1198		22:36.9	59:26	106.57	0.9	0.054	2
1199		21:35.9	68:33	106.57	12.15	0.235	2
1200		22:46.0	58:46	107.27	-0.24	0.02	5
1201		22:23.7	63:30	107.31	5.21	0.009	3
1202		22:26.7	63:05	107.38	4.67	0.004	5
1203		22:27.7	63:00	107.43	4.54	0.016	3
1204		22:26.7	63:15	107.47	4.82	2.5	2
1205		22:45.9	60:26	108.04	1.24	0.095	2
1206		22:28.7	64:25	108.27	5.7	0.083	3
1207		22:29.7	64:25	108.36	5.64	0.047	2
1208		22:30.7	64:25	108.46	5.58	0.018	1
1209		22:29.7	64:45	108.53	5.93	0.111	1
1210		22:44.9	62:06	108.7	2.77	0.011	4
1211		22:46.9	62:11	108.95	2.74	0.011	5
1212		22:47.9	62:13	109.07	2.71	0.014	3
1213		22:31.6	65:25	109.06	6.39	0.006	5
1214		22:33.6	65:46	109.41	6.57	0.256	1
1215		22:51.9	62:06	109.44	2.4	0.021	5
1216		22:51.9	62:16	109.52	2.55	0.142	4
1217	175	22:13.1	70:45	110.54	11.79	0.186	3
1218		23:02.0	62:16	110.58	2.05	1.59	3
1219		22:11.6	71:00	110.58	12.06	0.003	5
1220		23:04.1	61:51	110.63	1.57	0.006	4
1221		22:28.4	69:00	110.67	9.61	0.02	5
1222		23:05.1	61:46	110.7	1.45	0.002	4
1223		22:56.9	64:16	110.89	4.11	1.01	1
1224		23:04.0	63:46	111.39	3.33	0.016	3
1225		23:12.1	61:36	111.41	0.97	0.036	4
1226		23:10.1	62:16	111.44	1.68	0.009	4
1228		20:59.0	77:32	111.67	20.1	0.086	1
1229		23:14.1	61:59	111.78	1.24	0.004	5
1230		23:14.1	62:01	111.79	1.27	0.002	5
1231		23:18.2	61:16	111.97	0.4	0.013	5
1232		23:17.2	61:46	112.03	0.91	0.004	4
1233		23:16.5	62:20	112.15	1.47	0.001	6
1234		23:17.2	62:24	112.25	1.51	0.004	6
1235		22:14.9	73:25	112.24	13.88	0.037	6
1236		22:52.7	68:56	112.56	8.49	0.044	4
1237		23:22.6	62:36	112.91	1.48	0.004	4
1238		23:32.3	59:47	113.12	-1.58	14	2
1239		23:12.3	66:04	113.11	5.11	0.005	5
1240		23:11.0	66:26	113.12	5.5	0.126	2
1241		21:50.0	76:44	113.08	17.48	1.38	1
1242		22:31.2	73:15	113.15	13.11	0.793	3
1243		22:10.6	75:20	113.16	15.6	0.081	3
1244		23:25.2	62:46	113.25	1.53	0.007	4
1245		23:32.3	60:47	113.42	-0.63	0.07	3
1246		23:25.2	63:36	113.52	2.32	0.002	6
1247		22:20.8	75:15	113.66	15.17	0.167	4
1248		23:32.3	62:17	113.87	0.8	4.26	2
1249		23:44.4	58:57	114.37	-2.81	0.047	1
1250		23:22.1	67:16	114.45	5.89	2.63	1
1251		22:36.0	75:16	114.51	14.65	0.195	5
1252		23:45.4	63:17	115.59	1.35	0.181	3
1253		23:56.5	58:32	115.8	-3.58	0.009	6
1254		23:56.5	58:47	115.85	-3.34	0.152	3
1255		23:53.5	60:32	115.86	-1.55	0.001	5
1256		23:55.5	60:02	116	-2.09	0.161	3
1257		23:57.5	59:40	116.17	-2.5	0.029	5
1258		23:59.0	59:37	116.34	-2.59	0.01	2
1259		23:22.9	74:16	116.93	12.44	0.035	2
1260		23:57.0	64:57	117.21	2.68	0.004	4
1261		23:27.0	74:17	117.2	12.35	0.03	4
1262		23:27.0	74:17	117.2	12.35	0.066	6
1263		23:57.5	64:51	117.24	2.57	0.002	5
1264		23:52.5	68:17	117.5	6.03	0.102	2
1265		00:09.6	58:52	117.54	-3.57	0.003	3
1266		23:57.5	67:17	117.75	4.95	2.54	2
1267		00:00.6	66:47	117.94	4.4	0.019	3
1268		23:59.5	67:27	117.97	5.07	0.158	4
1269		00:00.6	67:10	118.01	4.78	0.025	4
1270		00:01.6	67:10	118.11	4.76	0.009	4
1271		00:01.6	67:17	118.13	4.87	0.01	5
1272		00:02.6	67:17	118.23	4.85	8.69	1
1273		00:02.6	68:32	118.46	6.08	0.199	2
1274		23:57.5	70:57	118.52	8.54	0.032	4
1275		00:06.6	67:27	118.64	4.95	0.02	5
1276		00:12.7	64:02	118.7	1.48	0.004	2
1277		00:13.7	64:02	118.81	1.46	0.007	3
1278		00:15.7	63:52	119.01	1.26	0.017	3
1279		00:17.7	63:47	119.22	1.15	0.025	4
1280		00:19.7	62:40	119.3	0.01	0.019	4
1281		00:18.7	63:57	119.35	1.3	0.006	4
1282		00:21.7	61:47	119.43	-0.89	0.016	4
1283		00:22.8	61:43	119.54	-0.97	0.008	3
1284		00:21.8	63:12	119.59	0.51	0.01	2
1285		00:24.8	63:12	119.93	0.48	0.013	2
1286		00:34.8	58:57	120.79	-3.86	0.06	2
1287		00:35.9	63:27	121.2	0.62	0.021	4
1288		00:38.0	66:06	121.57	3.27	0.342	2
1289		21:31.4	88:24	121.56	26.09	0.012	2
1290		00:41.9	61:06	121.78	-1.74	0.013	5
1291		00:42.2	62:01	121.85	-0.83	0.004	5
1292		21:40.5	88:34	121.75	26.16	0.466	1
1293		00:41.9	63:06	121.86	0.26	0.011	4
1294		00:42.3	62:16	121.87	-0.58	0.002	5
1296		00:44.8	52:46	121.92	-10.09	0.032	3
1297		00:43.0	62:46	121.96	-0.08	0.061	4
1298		00:43.4	61:06	121.96	-1.75	0.015	5
1299		00:45.1	55:44	122.03	-7.12	0.005	5
1300		00:43.9	61:26	122.04	-1.42	0.008	5
1301		00:43.8	62:27	122.04	-0.4	0.002	5
1302		00:43.9	61:51	122.05	-1	0.005	4
1303		00:43.0	65:16	122.05	2.42	0.7	2
1304		00:43.1	69:46	122.21	6.91	4	1
1305		01:03.3	67:46	124.06	4.92	2.68	1
1306		01:03.1	62:16	124.29	-0.57	11	1
1307		01:05.2	65:16	124.37	2.43	2.28	3
1308		01:13.7	72:56	124.59	10.13	1.57	1
1309		01:07.2	62:16	124.76	-0.55	0.432	2
1310		01:07.1	59:16	124.93	-3.54	1.11	2
1311		11:24.6	84:44	125.23	32.01	1.66	1
1312		01:14.2	62:06	125.59	-0.66	0.111	4
1313		01:16.2	61:41	125.87	-1.05	0.036	3
1314		01:17.2	61:26	126.01	-1.29	0.008	4
1315		01:20.3	63:06	126.19	0.41	0.282	3
1316		01:19.2	61:26	126.25	-1.26	0.045	3
1317		01:23.1	61:51	126.66	-0.8	0.002	5
1319		01:23.3	61:16	126.75	-1.37	0.206	3
1320		04:15.2	85:38	126.65	24.33	0.465	1
1321		10:36.7	84:14	126.69	31.87	1.76	1
1322		01:24.3	61:16	126.87	-1.36	0.004	5
1323		01:25.3	61:26	126.97	-1.18	0.024	4
1324		01:26.3	61:36	127.07	-1	0.036	4
1325		01:29.9	63:05	127.27	0.54	0.003	5
1326		01:30.7	63:05	127.36	0.56	0.003	5
1327		01:34.5	65:25	127.4	2.92	0.054	1
1328		01:38.6	67:15	127.48	4.8	1.53	1
1329		01:35.5	65:15	127.53	2.78	0.034	3
1330		01:36.5	65:15	127.63	2.8	0.019	4
1331		01:38.5	64:30	127.97	2.09	0.063	1
1332		01:42.5	62:03	128.87	-0.23	0.009	4
1333		02:26.1	75:29	128.88	13.71	0.007	6
1334		01:43.5	61:57	129.01	-0.31	0.011	3
1335		01:51.7	66:05	129	3.92	0.615	3
1336		01:53.8	66:45	129.04	4.62	1.37	3
1337		01:45.5	61:55	129.24	-0.29	0.012	4
1338		01:54.6	62:43	130.1	0.72	0.003	4
1339		01:54.6	62:31	130.14	0.53	0.003	5
1340		02:30.7	72:57	130.15	11.49	0.001	5
1341		01:55.8	62:42	130.24	0.74	0.002	4
1343		01:56.1	62:25	130.34	0.47	0.021	5
1345		01:57.1	62:39	130.39	0.73	0.015	5
1346		01:57.1	62:38	130.4	0.71	0.015	5
1347		01:58.1	62:20	130.58	0.45	0.045	3
1348		01:58.6	62:25	130.62	0.54	0.045	3
1349		02:13.9	66:14	131.12	4.68	1.18	1
1350		02:09.5	60:59	132.26	-0.46	0.004	4
1351		02:10.7	60:49	132.45	-0.58	0.003	5
1352		02:35.2	67:23	132.68	6.5	0.017	1
1353		02:44.4	68:13	133.14	7.61	2.51	1
1354		02:19.7	61:44	133.18	0.63	0.016	4
1355		02:52.7	69:02	133.46	8.68	0.007	6
1356		02:22.8	61:44	133.52	0.75	0.079	4
1357		02:52.5	68:52	133.52	8.53	0.004	6
1358		02:55.6	69:22	133.53	9.09	0.006	6
1359		02:25.8	62:04	133.74	1.18	0.061	5
1360		02:26.8	61:13	134.15	0.45	0.011	4
1361		02:28.3	61:38	134.17	0.9	0.011	4
1362		02:27.8	61:13	134.26	0.49	0.004	4
1363		02:27.8	61:03	134.32	0.33	0.011	4
1364		02:29.8	61:33	134.36	0.89	0.015	4
1365		02:28.8	60:48	134.52	0.14	0.093	4
1367		02:31.8	61:18	134.68	0.74	0.016	4
1368		02:32.8	61:23	134.76	0.87	0.006	3
1369		02:33.8	61:23	134.87	0.91	0.012	3
1370		02:31.8	60:28	134.99	-0.03	0.035	5
1371		02:34.8	60:43	135.24	0.34	0.206	4
1372		02:37.8	61:23	135.32	1.1	0.027	3
1373		02:37.8	61:13	135.38	0.94	12	2
1374		02:34.7	58:23	136.13	-1.82	0.011	4
1375		02:44.9	60:53	136.3	0.98	0.029	3
1376		02:43.8	60:33	136.32	0.63	0.019	5
1377		03:15.1	61:01	139.46	2.84	0.025	4
1378		03:14.9	60:20	139.8	2.25	0.001	5
1379		03:15.5	60:21	139.86	2.3	0.002	5
1380		03:15.7	60:09	139.98	2.15	0.001	5
1381		03:16.5	60:13	140.03	2.25	0.006	5
1382		03:17.0	60:04	140.17	2.16	0.01	4
1383		03:18.0	60:06	140.26	2.25	0.003	4
1384		03:20.0	60:01	140.51	2.32	0.068	4
1385		03:21.0	59:49	140.73	2.21	0.004	5
1386		03:22.2	59:41	140.93	2.18	0.008	5
1387	6	03:56.5	56:04	146.74	1.99	0.028	4
1388		04:03.0	56:48	146.94	3.15	0.007	4
1389		04:04.5	56:54	147.03	3.36	0.002	6
1390		04:09.0	55:08	148.68	2.46	0.952	3
1391		03:57.8	53:09	148.77	-0.11	1.37	1
1392	8	04:14.0	55:08	149.2	2.94	0.034	5
1393		04:13.0	54:48	149.33	2.6	0.018	5
1394		04:17.0	55:17	149.4	3.36	0.184	5
1395		04:13.9	54:08	149.89	2.21	1.46	2
1396	11	04:21.0	55:07	149.93	3.64	0.07	3
1397		04:21.0	54:52	150.11	3.46	0.018	5
1398		04:19.0	54:27	150.19	2.96	0.49	3
1399		04:24.0	55:07	150.24	3.94	0.163	5
1400		04:25.0	54:57	150.46	3.93	0.011	3
1401		04:28.0	55:13	150.57	4.42	0.017	5
1402	13	04:24.0	54:37	150.59	3.59	0.172	4
1403		04:28.5	55:12	150.63	4.46	0.003	5
1404		04:30.0	55:17	150.72	4.67	0.025	5
1405	21	04:34.0	55:16	151.11	5.09	0.172	4
1406		04:38.1	55:24	151.4	5.6	0.005	5
1407	12	04:30.0	54:17	151.44	3.98	0.13	5
1408		04:32.0	54:31	151.46	4.36	0.156	3
1409		04:36.0	54:56	151.55	5.07	0.009	4
1410		04:36.0	54:51	151.61	5.02	0.003	5
1411		04:36.0	54:26	151.92	4.73	0.009	4
1412		04:37.0	54:26	152.02	4.84	0.002	5
1414		04:34.0	53:26	152.46	3.84	0.201	3
1415		04:42.0	54:26	152.51	5.38	0.064	3
1416		04:40.0	54:06	152.56	4.94	0.007	5
1417		04:41.0	53:56	152.79	4.94	0.005	5
1418	20	04:33.9	52:36	153.07	3.27	2.6	2
1419		04:51.1	54:45	153.11	6.59	0.079	2
1420		04:32.9	52:16	153.21	2.93	0.002	5
1421		04:32.9	52:01	153.39	2.76	0.009	5
1422		04:49.0	54:05	153.43	5.94	1.13	1
1423		04:45.0	53:21	153.62	5.01	0.001	5
1424		04:45.0	53:16	153.68	4.95	0.006	5
1425		04:46.0	53:05	153.91	4.96	0.093	4
1426		04:47.0	53:05	154.01	5.07	0.019	5
1427		04:43.9	52:41	154.03	4.45	0.005	4
1428		04:43.9	52:36	154.09	4.4	0.005	4
1429		04:47.9	52:05	154.87	4.54	0.032	5
1430		04:48.9	52:08	154.93	4.69	0.009	5
1431		04:47.9	52:00	154.93	4.48	0.01	5
1432		04:51.9	52:05	155.27	5.01	0.019	4
1433		04:50.9	51:55	155.3	4.78	0.019	5
1434		03:36.3	37:40	155.53	-14.56	0.704	3
1436		04:53.9	51:45	155.72	5.03	0.312	3
1437		04:59.3	52:05	155.99	5.89	0.003	5
1438		04:55.9	51:35	156.05	5.17	0.171	4
1439		05:00.9	52:04	156.14	6.09	0.012	5
1440		03:57.9	41:29	156.39	-8.98	0.027	4
1441		04:00.1	41:33	156.65	-8.64	0.027	5
1442		03:50.3	38:59	156.9	-11.81	0.316	4
1443		04:00.4	40:48	157.19	-9.17	1.65	2
1444		04:33.7	46:56	157.2	-0.6	0.539	2
1445	17; 16; 15	04:32.1	46:36	157.27	-1.02	0.084	5
1446		03:46.3	37:09	157.47	-13.73	0.294	3
1447		04:03.4	40:48	157.62	-8.79	0.653	4
1448	203	03:26.1	30:40	158.18	-21.41	0.053	4
1449		03:53.3	37:39	158.24	-12.46	2.3	3
1450	205; 206	03:29.6	31:20	158.4	-20.43	0.009	5
1451	202	03:26.1	30:10	158.5	-21.82	0.14	4
1452		03:28.1	30:40	158.55	-21.16	1.66	3
1453		02:56.0	20:17	158.66	-33.8	0.066	4
1454		02:56.8	20:12	158.9	-33.77	0.86	3
1455	204	03:28.1	30:10	158.87	-21.56	0.025	5
1456		03:55.3	37:09	158.88	-12.58	0.044	3
1457		02:55.8	19:32	159.11	-34.45	0.262	4
1458		02:57.8	20:12	159.14	-33.64	0.056	4
1459		04:08.4	39:38	159.13	-9.02	9.73	1
1460		05:44.0	52:21	159.59	11.74	0.181	3
1461		04:41.9	44:56	159.66	-0.88	0.05	3
1462		04:00.3	36:58	159.77	-12.05	0.03	5
1463		04:01.3	36:53	159.98	-11.98	0.027	3
1464		04:00.7	36:40	160.03	-12.22	0.004	5
1465	25	04:52.7	46:00	160.06	1.25	0.077	3
1466		05:48.0	52:11	160.04	12.19	0.124	4
1467		05:49.0	52:11	160.12	12.32	0.029	3
1468		03:40.1	31:25	160.23	-18.98	0.12	5
1469		04:03.1	36:38	160.42	-11.92	0.006	4
1470	4; 3	03:43.1	31:49	160.47	-18.26	0.403	5
1471	5	03:48.0	32:54	160.56	-16.78	0.097	5
1472	2; 1	03:41.1	31:10	160.57	-19.04	3.58	4
1473		04:11.3	38:08	160.6	-9.71	0.148	4
1474		04:48.6	44:05	161.07	-0.53	4.64	1
1475		05:03.6	45:04	161.98	2.18	0.368	2
1476		05:03.6	44:34	162.38	1.87	0.106	3
1477		05:03.6	44:04	162.77	1.56	0.278	4
1478		04:23.3	37:07	163.03	-8.76	4.44	3
1479		04:38.4	39:36	163.23	-4.9	1.53	1
1480		05:05.6	43:34	163.39	1.54	0.097	2
1481		04:39.4	38:16	164.35	-5.64	0.553	3
1482		04:28.3	35:37	164.83	-9.07	0.13	1
1483		04:35.3	36:26	165.19	-7.46	0.217	4
1484		04:03.1	29:08	165.72	-17.4	0.445	1
1485		04:37.3	35:41	166.02	-7.66	0.316	1
1486		04:08.1	29:08	166.55	-16.64	0.48	1
1487		04:39.3	34:56	166.86	-7.86	0.94	3
1488		04:53.4	36:42	167.35	-4.54	0.568	2
1489		04:04.7	26:28	167.96	-19.05	0.027	5
1490		04:52.0	35:40	167.98	-5.4	0.075	4
1491		04:04.6	26:17	168.08	-19.2	0.004	5
1492		04:49.3	35:05	168.08	-6.19	1.25	1
1493		04:54.3	35:40	168.28	-5.03	0.463	2
1494		04:54.2	35:13	168.62	-5.33	0.011	4
1495	7; 10; 211; 209; 216; 213; 218; 217	04:18.1	27:37	169.27	-16.13	2.6	5
1496		04:43.2	32:06	169.58	-9.08	0.71	3
1497		04:27.1	28:37	169.92	-13.99	0.725	2
1498		04:11.0	24:58	170.14	-19.11	0.118	5
1499		04:10.5	24:48	170.18	-19.3	0.072	3
1500	219	04:33.1	29:26	170.19	-12.46	0.972	3
1501		04:15.0	25:07	170.68	-18.34	1.2	2
1502		05:03.3	34:04	170.68	-4.57	0.484	1
1504		04:41.2	29:56	170.97	-10.82	0.336	1
1505		04:48.2	31:05	171.05	-8.91	1.05	1
1506		04:20.0	25:17	171.37	-17.4	0.334	6
1507	24	04:43.2	29:46	171.38	-10.6	0.09	5
1508		04:41.1	29:06	171.62	-11.36	0.183	3
1509		05:34.2	37:17	171.66	2.41	0.108	3
1510		05:16.3	34:48	171.68	-1.97	0.252	3
1511		04:20.0	24:47	171.75	-17.74	0.3	3
1512		05:03.8	32:47	171.76	-5.27	0.016	6
1513		04:52.2	30:50	171.79	-8.41	0.057	4
1514		04:42.6	29:06	171.83	-11.11	0.05	4
1515		04:53.2	30:55	171.87	-8.19	0.147	3
1516		05:23.3	35:03	172.31	-0.65	5.62	1
1517	28; 27; 26	04:55.2	30:35	172.4	-8.06	0.051	6
1518		05:39.4	37:02	172.43	3.15	4.6	1
1519		04:55.7	30:35	172.47	-7.98	0.063	4
1520		04:44.1	28:26	172.57	-11.29	0.398	1
1521	22; 19; 14; 220	04:33.1	26:06	172.76	-14.66	4.1	4
1522	222	05:07.2	32:04	172.79	-5.11	0.018	4
1523	29	05:06.2	31:44	172.92	-5.48	0.017	6
1524	215; 212; 210	04:28.0	24:37	173.16	-16.5	0.324	5
1525		05:42.0	36:19	173.3	3.22	0.006	4
1526		05:28.6	34:31	173.35	-0.05	0.003	4
1527		04:39.1	26:16	173.53	-13.53	0.01	6
1528		04:37.1	25:46	173.63	-14.2	2	3
1529	18	04:32.0	24:26	173.91	-15.92	0.223	5
1530		05:23.3	33:03	173.95	-1.79	0.045	3
1531		04:32.0	24:19	174	-16	0.014	3
1532		04:40.1	25:46	174.08	-13.68	0.112	4
1533		04:36.2	24:55	174.18	-14.88	0.011	5
1534		04:40.1	25:36	174.21	-13.79	0.87	5
1535		04:35.5	23:54	174.87	-15.66	0.111	6
1536		04:33.0	23:06	175.12	-16.62	1.5	4
1537		04:51.1	26:25	175.15	-11.34	0.382	3
1538		04:46.1	25:05	175.49	-13.06	3	4
1539		04:56.1	26:35	175.72	-10.36	2.23	1
1540		05:01.1	26:09	176.75	-9.73	0.282	4
1541		04:44.0	22:46	177.07	-14.88	0.352	1
1542		05:01.1	25:34	177.22	-10.08	0.626	3
1543		04:27.4	18:52	177.66	-20.35	0.09	5
1544		05:04.1	25:14	177.91	-9.74	0.109	6
1545		05:15.3	26:43	178.18	-6.82	0.052	3
1546		04:28.9	18:27	178.25	-20.34	0.37	4
1547		05:16.1	26:23	178.55	-6.86	0.049	5
1548		05:16.1	26:13	178.69	-6.96	0.061	4
1549		05:17.1	26:13	178.82	-6.78	0.079	4
1550		06:00.3	32:10	178.81	4.36	0.041	3
1551		04:31.4	18:06	178.92	-20.1	0.043	6
1552		05:17.7	26:03	179.04	-6.76	0.009	6
1553		05:19.1	26:13	179.08	-6.41	0.087	2
1554		05:20.0	26:13	179.2	-6.24	0.005	4
1555		06:01.3	31:50	179.21	4.37	0.09	4
1556		04:37.4	16:56	180.85	-19.71	0.05	5
1557		06:06.2	30:00	181.34	4.41	1.04	3
1558		04:45.9	17:05	182.02	-18	0.713	2
1559		05:26.0	23:03	182.62	-6.88	1.35	1
1560		06:13.2	27:59	183.84	4.78	2.3	2
1561		04:50.8	12:17	186.87	-19.87	0.274	1
1562		05:01.8	14:04	186.94	-16.64	0.152	3
1563		05:01.8	13:49	187.15	-16.79	0.052	5
1564		06:18.0	23:14	188.56	3.5	0.033	4
1565		06:21.0	23:19	188.81	4.15	0.252	1
1566		06:21.0	23:09	188.96	4.07	0	3
1567		06:22.5	23:18	188.98	4.45	0	3
1568		06:23.0	22:58	189.33	4.4	0	3
1569		04:01.1	00:38	189.54	-36.67	0.631	2
1570	227	06:07.0	19:20	190.75	-0.63	0.02	4
1572		05:10.8	10:34	191.25	-16.77	0.079	4
1573		05:30.8	13:32	191.35	-11.03	1.04	2
1574		06:07.7	18:30	191.57	-0.88	0.022	4
1576		06:08.3	18:10	191.93	-0.92	0.049	4
1577	31; 30	05:29.8	12:32	192.08	-11.77	0.412	4
1578		06:08.4	17:59	192.09	-0.98	0.049	4
1579		05:39.8	13:47	192.3	-9.04	0.317	1
1580		05:33.8	12:52	192.32	-10.76	0.222	1
1581		05:29.4	12:12	192.32	-12.03	0.001	5
1582		05:31.8	12:32	192.35	-11.35	0.011	5
1583	225	05:28.8	12:02	192.39	-12.24	0.057	5
1584		05:31.6	12:17	192.54	-11.53	0.014	4
1585	32	05:40.8	13:21	192.78	-9.05	0.059	3
1586		06:05.9	16:00	193.54	-2.48	7.31	1
1587		06:07.9	16:00	193.77	-2.06	7.31	1
1588	223	05:20.7	08:23	194.53	-15.84	0.159	3
1589		05:18.3	07:23	195.09	-16.87	0.027	2
1590		05:20.7	07:23	195.42	-16.37	0.85	4
1591		06:09.8	13:39	196.05	-2.78	0.068	3
1594		05:44.7	09:01	197.07	-10.41	0.059	5
1595	35	05:27.7	06:32	197.09	-15.31	1.07	2
1596		05:45.7	09:01	197.2	-10.2	0.041	4
1597		05:50.2	08:41	198.06	-9.4	0.032	4
1598		05:52.4	08:21	198.62	-9.09	0.072	5
1599	36	05:49.7	07:31	199.02	-10.09	0.181	4
1600		06:30.8	12:58	199.07	1.4	0.396	3
1601		06:29.8	12:23	199.47	0.91	0.066	5
1602		05:44.7	06:01	199.72	-11.91	0.378	4
1604		06:28.8	11:38	200.02	0.34	0.008	5
1605	37; 38	06:32.8	10:38	201.36	0.74	1.25	4
1606		06:29.8	10:13	201.38	-0.11	0.043	4
1607		06:30.8	10:18	201.42	0.15	0.015	5
1608		06:36.8	10:47	201.67	1.69	0.045	5
1609		06:36.3	10:27	201.91	1.43	0.016	5
1610	39	06:38.0	10:27	202.1	1.8	0.019	5
1611		06:00.7	05:00	202.59	-8.92	0.233	3
1612		06:02.7	04:40	203.12	-8.64	0.079	3
1613		06:40.7	09:27	203.3	1.95	0	3
1614		05:35.5	-00:38	203.39	-16.48	0.004	5
1615		05:05.5	-03:26	203.42	-25.06	0.084	2
1616		05:06.5	-03:26	203.55	-24.84	0.016	5
1617		05:54.6	03:00	203.64	-11.2	7.75	3
1618		06:05.6	04:20	203.78	-8.15	0.172	4
1619		06:04.6	04:10	203.81	-8.45	0.038	5
1620		05:36.6	-00:08	203.97	-16.5	0.012	5
1621		05:55.0	02:20	204.28	-11.43	0.027	4
1622		05:54.6	02:00	204.53	-11.67	0.122	6
1623		06:07.6	03:30	204.76	-8.11	0.131	1
1624		05:57.6	02:00	204.9	-11.02	0	2
1625		06:27.7	05:58	204.91	-2.53	19.4	1
1626		06:44.7	07:57	205.09	2.13	1.17	3
1627		05:46.6	00:01	205.36	-14.39	0.063	6
1628		06:12.6	02:59	205.8	-7.24	3.36	2
1629		06:09.6	02:29	205.89	-8.14	1.18	3
1630	33	05:45.5	-00:59	206.15	-15.08	5.98	4
1631		06:44.2	06:22	206.44	1.29	0.023	4
1632		05:59.6	00:30	206.49	-11.29	2.35	1
1633		06:24.6	03:28	206.77	-4.36	0.106	4
1634		05:18.5	-05:47	207.35	-23.29	0.492	2
1635		05:41.1	-03:09	207.6	-17.07	0.008	4
1636		05:41.4	-03:10	207.66	-17.01	0.003	4
1637		06:43.6	03:57	208.53	0.07	0.964	2
1638		05:57.5	-02:30	208.96	-13.13	2.39	2
1639		06:51.6	04:26	209	2.07	0.97	3
1640		05:33.5	-05:48	209.18	-19.97	0.018	5
1641		05:37.4	-06:58	210.76	-19.61	6.27	4
1642		04:35.3	-14:14	210.89	-36.51	0.372	3
1644		06:07.7	-05:30	212.89	-12.24	0.007	5
1645		06:07.0	-05:40	212.96	-12.47	0.052	4
1646		06:07.4	-06:00	213.32	-12.51	3.14	3
1647		05:42.4	-09:59	214.2	-19.83	4.23	3
1648		05:52.4	-09:09	214.55	-17.25	1.85	2
1649		06:58.1	-03:57	217.21	-0.32	0.005	3
1650		06:59.5	-04:54	218.21	-0.45	0.016	2
1651		06:22.4	-09:52	218.52	-10.89	0.255	2
1652		06:26.4	-10:02	219.11	-10.08	1.16	2
1653		06:57.8	-07:56	220.72	-2.2	0.012	3
1654		06:59.4	-07:44	220.73	-1.76	0.05	3
1655		06:56.6	-08:14	220.85	-2.6	0.014	4
1656		06:56.5	-08:24	220.99	-2.7	0.077	3
1657		07:04.4	-10:25	223.66	-1.89	1.08	3
1658		07:14.4	-11:05	225.4	-0.03	0	2
1659		07:17.6	-23:20	236.63	-5.02	0.045	4
1660		07:20.1	-23:56	237.41	-4.79	0.047	4
1661		07:22.1	-24:06	237.78	-4.46	0.375	2
1662		07:28.1	-23:36	237.99	-3.02	0.128	2
1663		07:32.1	-23:06	237.99	-1.97	0.428	2
1664		07:24.1	-24:36	238.43	-4.3	0.154	3
1665		07:35.1	-23:37	238.77	-1.61	0.181	3
1666		07:36.1	-24:07	239.32	-1.66	0.027	4
1667		07:25.1	-25:46	239.57	-4.65	0.418	3
1668		07:37.0	-24:54	240.1	-1.87	0.02	4
1669		07:56.0	-29:38	246.32	-0.6	0.594	2
1670		08:04.5	-31:39	248.99	-0.1	0.038	1
1671		08:06.0	-32:09	249.58	-0.11	0.142	1
1672		16:21.1	-28:07	349.37	15.3	0.74	4
1673		16:30.1	-29:26	349.74	12.94	0.077	3
1674		16:29.8	-28:47	350.2	13.44	0.009	3
1675	229	16:18.1	-26:07	350.41	17.16	1.1	4
1676		16:21.1	-26:07	350.89	16.67	2.86	3
1677	237; 234; 239	16:53.2	-32:05	350.95	7.45	10.16	1
1678		16:16.0	-24:37	351.23	18.52	0.138	3
1679	49	17:02.8	-32:54	351.54	5.36	0.011	3
1680		16:21.0	-24:07	352.43	18.02	2.86	4
1681		16:27.0	-24:47	352.87	16.56	0.206	5
1682	55	17:08.2	-32:06	352.89	4.92	0.023	5
1683		16:29.0	-25:07	352.92	16	2.43	1
1684		16:31.1	-25:26	352.97	15.44	0.084	4
1685	56	17:09.2	-32:09	352.97	4.72	0.004	5
1686		16:25.8	-24:20	353.03	17.06	0.016	6
1687		16:23.0	-23:37	353.14	18.02	3.17	3
1688		16:26.0	-24:07	353.23	17.17	0.76	4
1689		16:32.0	-25:05	353.4	15.5	0.007	6
1690		16:26.8	-24:03	353.41	17.08	0.02	5
1691		17:15.3	-32:33	353.39	3.46	0.987	3
1692		16:26.5	-23:57	353.44	17.2	0.007	5
1693		17:13.2	-32:14	353.41	3.99	0.014	3
1694		17:10.2	-31:44	353.44	4.8	0.528	3
1695	241	17:03.2	-30:34	353.47	6.7	0.54	2
1696	42	16:28.8	-24:20	353.5	16.55	0.036	6
1697		17:13.2	-32:08	353.48	4.04	0.027	3
1698	252	17:15.2	-32:13	353.66	3.65	0.038	5
1699		17:15.5	-32:11	353.72	3.62	0.034	5
1700		17:12.2	-31:34	353.82	4.56	0.535	2
1701		17:16.2	-32:06	353.88	3.55	0.006	3
1702		17:16.2	-31:48	354.12	3.72	0.059	3
1703		17:18.7	-32:06	354.18	3.12	0.008	5
1704		16:30.8	-23:46	354.25	16.57	0.01	6
1705		17:20.2	-32:08	354.34	2.84	0.034	5
1706		17:12.2	-30:54	354.36	4.95	0.95	3
1707		17:13.2	-30:59	354.42	4.73	0.029	5
1708		17:10.2	-30:24	354.51	5.59	0.047	4
1709		16:33.0	-23:46	354.59	16.19	0.099	6
1710		17:20.7	-31:57	354.55	2.85	0.106	5
1712	44	16:38.0	-24:26	354.83	14.88	1.56	5
1713		17:11.2	-30:12	354.8	5.54	0.007	4
1714		17:12.2	-30:19	354.84	5.29	0.006	5
1715		17:12.2	-30:14	354.9	5.34	0.003	5
1716	243	17:10.2	-29:44	355.05	5.99	0.251	3
1717	41	16:18.9	-20:07	355.25	21.04	0.357	3
1718		17:15.2	-30:14	355.27	4.81	0.005	5
1719		16:19.9	-20:07	355.42	20.87	0.61	5
1720		17:16.2	-30:13	355.41	4.64	0.093	4
1721	40	16:15.9	-19:07	355.55	22.24	0.287	3
1722		17:16.2	-30:03	355.55	4.74	7.78	2
1723		17:31.3	-32:12	355.59	0.87	0.005	5
1724		17:31.8	-32:13	355.63	0.77	0.002	5
1725	254	17:19.2	-30:23	355.65	4.02	0.032	5
1726	247; 245	17:12.2	-29:14	355.72	5.93	0.093	3
1727	249	17:12.2	-29:14	355.72	5.93	0.002	5
1728		17:11.2	-29:02	355.75	6.23	0.02	3
1729		16:43.0	-24:06	355.85	14.22	0.9	4
1730		17:33.3	-32:12	355.82	0.51	1.68	2
1731		17:06.1	-28:04	355.88	7.68	1.32	2
1732		17:29.2	-31:32	355.91	1.59	0.912	2
1733	248	17:12.5	-29:01	355.93	6.01	0.018	5
1734		17:32.4	-31:52	356.01	0.84	0.006	5
1735		17:32.1	-31:43	356.1	0.97	0.002	5
1736	244	17:10.2	-28:24	356.13	6.78	0.038	5
1737		17:11.1	-28:29	356.2	6.55	0.192	4
1738		17:32.9	-31:43	356.19	0.83	0.003	5
1739		16:35.0	-22:01	356.3	16.96	0.093	3
1740		16:36.2	-22:13	356.32	16.62	0.084	5
1741		17:22.2	-30:03	356.3	3.68	17.56	3
1742	250	17:12.1	-28:24	356.4	6.42	0.034	4
1743		17:12.1	-28:04	356.67	6.62	0.51	3
1744	45	16:40.0	-22:16	356.87	15.91	0.099	5
1745		16:49.0	-23:55	356.87	13.25	0.255	4
1746	59	17:11.1	-27:24	357.08	7.19	0.306	5
1747		16:51.0	-23:50	357.22	12.95	0.28	3
1748		16:49.0	-23:25	357.27	13.56	0.138	2
1749	256	17:23.2	-29:03	357.25	4.07	0.117	5
1750		16:52.0	-23:55	357.3	12.71	0.28	3
1751		17:31.2	-30:02	357.39	2.06	1.23	2
1752	43	16:29.9	-19:36	357.46	19.41	1.78	4
1753		17:54.3	-33:01	357.45	-3.68	1.27	2
1754		17:32.2	-30:02	357.51	1.88	0.321	1
1755		16:44.0	-21:56	357.74	15.4	0.66	4
1756		17:16.1	-27:23	357.73	6.29	0.285	5
1757		16:31.9	-19:36	357.78	19.05	0.061	6
1758		17:55.3	-32:40	357.85	-3.69	0.01	4
1759	238	16:52.1	-23:05	357.99	13.21	0.027	6
1760		18:00.3	-33:00	358.09	-4.77	0.054	4
1761		16:56.0	-23:35	358.14	12.19	0.402	2
1762		18:02.3	-33:10	358.15	-5.22	0.023	4
1763		16:56.0	-23:25	358.28	12.29	0.402	2
1764		17:28.2	-28:32	358.28	3.44	2.16	2
1765		16:45.0	-21:15	358.43	15.63	0.079	5
1766		17:58.3	-32:20	358.46	-4.07	0.09	2
1767		17:18.6	-26:45	358.57	6.19	0.007	5
1768	66	17:20.1	-26:52	358.67	5.85	0.013	6
1769	275; 278	17:42.2	-30:01	358.68	0.06	12.5	4
1770		16:32.9	-18:36	358.75	19.5	0.813	3
1771	87	18:04.3	-32:40	358.79	-5.34	0.115	4
1772	65	17:19.8	-26:38	358.83	6.04	0.016	6
1773	67	17:21.1	-26:48	358.85	5.71	0.036	6
1774		17:22.6	-27:01	358.87	5.31	0.029	6
1775	46	16:57.0	-22:50	358.9	12.46	0.008	6
1776		17:33.2	-28:32	358.89	2.53	2.45	2
1777		16:57.0	-22:45	358.97	12.52	0.05	4
1778		15:39.9	-07:10	359.06	36.75	0.086	5
1780		15:40.7	-07:10	359.23	36.6	0.197	4
1781	230	16:27.9	-17:07	359.18	21.38	1.19	3
1782		16:41.9	-19:46	359.2	17.12	0.047	6
1783		17:58.2	-31:30	359.18	-3.65	0.079	2
1784		16:59.8	-22:54	359.23	11.9	0.027	4
1785		17:00.0	-22:54	359.25	11.86	0.027	4
1786	300	18:06.7	-32:23	359.29	-5.64	0.011	4
1787		17:00.0	-22:44	359.39	11.96	0.09	3
1788		17:53.2	-30:41	359.35	-2.31	0.084	3
1789		18:08.3	-32:30	359.35	-5.99	0.767	3
1790		17:11.1	-24:34	359.4	8.85	1.08	3
1791	47	16:59.6	-22:35	359.46	12.13	0.017	5
1793		17:25.6	-26:33	359.63	5.02	1.08	2
1794		17:26.4	-26:39	359.65	4.81	0.006	5
1795		17:54.7	-30:31	359.66	-2.5	0.084	4
1796		16:41.9	-19:06	359.75	17.53	0.344	3
1797		17:02.0	-22:34	359.81	11.69	0.149	3
1798	295	18:04.2	-31:30	359.81	-4.76	0.018	4
1799		16:46.9	-19:40	0.03	16.24	0.017	4
1800		17:01.5	-22:14	0.01	11.98	0.015	3
1801		17:50.2	-29:31	0.02	-1.15	2.77	2
1802		17:02.3	-22:13	0.14	11.84	0.016	3

== See also ==
- List of astronomical catalogues
