= B1 =

B1, B.I, B.1 or B-1 may refer to:

== Biology and chemistry ==
- Bradykinin receptor B1, a human protein
- Cinnamtannin B1, a condensed tannin found in cinnamon
- Combretastatin B-1, a stilbenoid found in Combretum sp.
- Fumonisin B1, a toxins produced by several species of Fusarium molds
- B-1 cell, a lymphocyte type
- Arecatannin B1, a tannin found in the betel nut
- Proanthocyanidin B1, a B type proanthocyanidin
- Vitamin B_{1}, also known as thiamine

== Media ==
- B1 TV, a Romanian television channel
- B1, one of the former names of RBB Berlin, a defunct German television channel
- A class of FM radio broadcasting in North America

== Vehicles ==
- Rockwell B-1 Lancer, a United States Air Force strategic bomber
- B1-class Melbourne tram
- B1 (New York City bus) serving Brooklyn
- B1 type submarine, a World War II Imperial Japanese Navy submarine class
- Alsace-Lorraine B 1, an Alsace-Lorraine P 1 class steam locomotive
- Ceylon Government Railway B1, a steam locomotive class
- Marussia B1, a high-performance luxury sports coupé built by Russian automaker Marussia Motors
- GS&WR Class B1, a Great Southern and Western Railway Irish steam locomotive
- HMS B1, a B-class submarine of the Royal Navy
- LB&SCR B1 class, an 1882 British express passenger steam locomotive
- GCR Class 8C, classified B1 during LNER ownership, reclassified B18 in 1943
- LNER Thompson Class B1, a British steam locomotive class
- NER Class B1, a class of British steam locomotives
- NCC Class B1, a Northern Counties Committee Irish steam locomotive
- Pennsylvania Railroad class B1, an American electric locomotive
- Saturn B-1, a 1959 four-stage rocket
- Spanish submarine B-1, a Spanish Navy submarine
- USS B-1 (SS-10), a United States Navy B-class submarine
- Brasilsat B1, a 1994 communication satellite
- Char B1, a French heavy tank
- B1 Centauro, an Italian wheeled tank destroyer
- Boom XB-1 Baby Boom, an American technology demonstrator aircraft
- Finnish Steam Locomotive Class B1

== Other uses ==
- B1 (file format)
- B1 (classification), a medical-based Paralympic classification for blind sport
- B-1/B-2 Visa, issued by the United States to a foreign citizen seeking to enter the United States of America for business purposes
- A subclass of B-class stars
- Barnard 1
- B1, an international standard paper size (707 × 1000 mm), defined in ISO 216
- A level in the Common European Framework of Reference for Languages
- A security class in the TCSEC
- the code for permission to use specific land or premises for offices, light industry in town and country planning in the United Kingdom
- A sentient banana in the children's TV series Bananas in Pyjamas
- B1, a model of battle droid in the Star Wars franchise
- B-Line (Sydney) bus route, numbered B1, Australia
- BRT Sunway Line, numbered B1 on maps, Malaysia
- Chopin's Ballade No. 1
- The darkest sky on the Bortle scale
- Line B1 (Tianjin Metro), China
- Unitree B1, a robot dog made by Unitree Robotics

== See also ==
- B01 (disambiguation)
- BI (disambiguation)
- 1B (disambiguation)
