= MCHP =

MCHP may refer to:

- Methyl hydroxychalcone, a type of chalcone
- Micro combined heat and power
- Microchip Technology NASDAQ code, an American manufacturer of microcontroller, memory and analog semiconductors
