= 1B =

1B may refer to:

== Science and technology ==
- Alpha-1B adrenergic receptor
- Arginine vasopressin receptor 1B
- Interferon beta-1b
- Melatonin receptor 1B
- The ASCII hexadecimal code for the escape character
- 1b as one billion

== Sport ==
- First baseman
- Single (baseball)

== Transport ==
- Axle arrangement on steam locomotives corresponding to a 2-4-0 wheel arrangement
- GCR Class 1B, a class of British 2-6-4T steam locomotive
- National Highway 1B (India, old numbering)

== See also ==
- B1 (disambiguation)
- Billion
