= Methyl hydroxychalcone =

- Chemical structure of methyl hydroxychalcone

Names
- Preferred IUPAC name 3-Hydroxy-3′-methylchalcone
- Other names MCHP; 3'-Methyl-3-hydroxychalcone

Identifiers
CAS Number	153976-41-1
3D model (JSmol)	Interactive image
ChemSpider	4944650
PubChem CID	6440383
UNII	CII78W0E01
CompTox Dashboard (EPA)	DTXSID801028833
- InChI: InChI=1S/C16H14O2/c1-12-4-2-6-14(10-12)16(18)9-8-13-5-3-7-15(17)11-13/h2-11,17H,1H3/b9-8+ Key: GPJXEEMHEDUKIP-CMDGGOBGSA-N; InChI=1/C16H14O2/c1-12-4-2-6-14(10-12)16(18)9-8-13-5-3-7-15(17)11-13/h2-11,17H,1H3/b9-8+ Key: GPJXEEMHEDUKIP-CMDGGOBGBY
- SMILES: CC1=CC=CC(=C1)C(=O)C=CC2=CC(=CC=C2)O

Properties
Chemical formula	C_{16}H_{14}O_{2}
Molar mass	238.28 g/mol
- Except where otherwise noted, data are given for materials in their standard state (at 25 °C [77 °F], 100 kPa). verify (what is ?) Infobox references

Methyl hydroxychalcone is a chalconoid found in cinnamon. It was thought to be an insulin mimetic, improving insulin response of diabetics. It has since been determined that a flavonoid (cinnamtannin B1) is responsible for the insulin-like biological activity.

== See also ==
- Anti-diabetic medication
