= CB 130-3 =

Molecular cloud in the constellation Serpens

Nebula
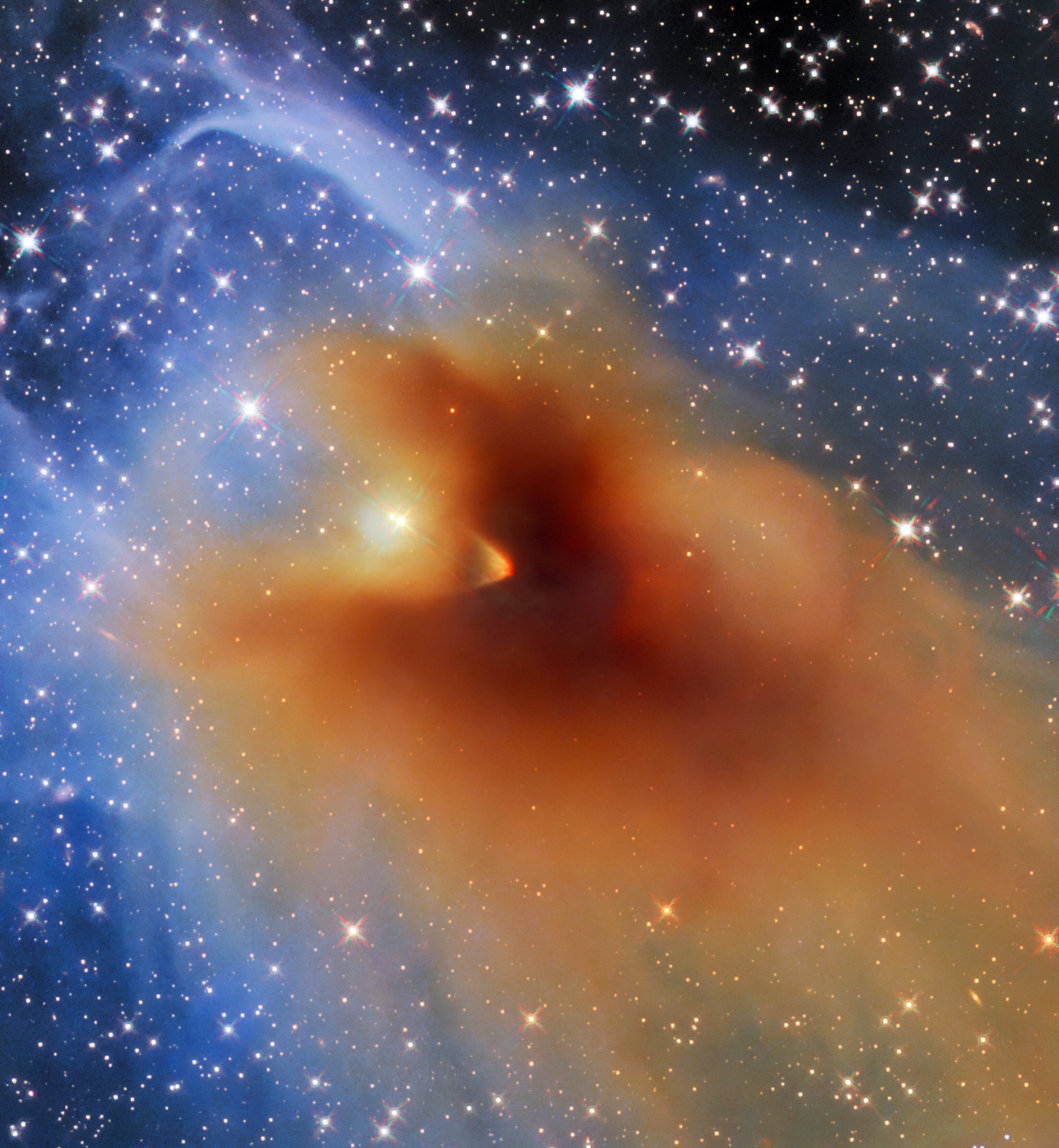
- An image of CB 130-3 taken by the NASA Hubble Space Telescope.

Observation data: J2000 epoch
- Right ascension: 18^{h} 16^{m} 15^{s}
- Declination: −02° 32.8′
- Distance: 652 ly (200 pc)
- Constellation: Serpens
- Notable features: Dense orange molecular cloud that blocks background light surrounded by light blue gas
- Designations: LDN 507

CB 130-3 (also known as LDN 507) is a dense carbon-chain rich molecular cloud located in the constellation of Serpens about 652 light years (200 pc) away from Earth. Objects like CB 130-3 form many new stars through stellar formation. The central dense areas are dark orange clouds surrounded by a light blue haze of gas. The central dense cloud of gas blocks out background light from stars entirely.
