= Barnard 147 =

Dark nebula

Dark nebula
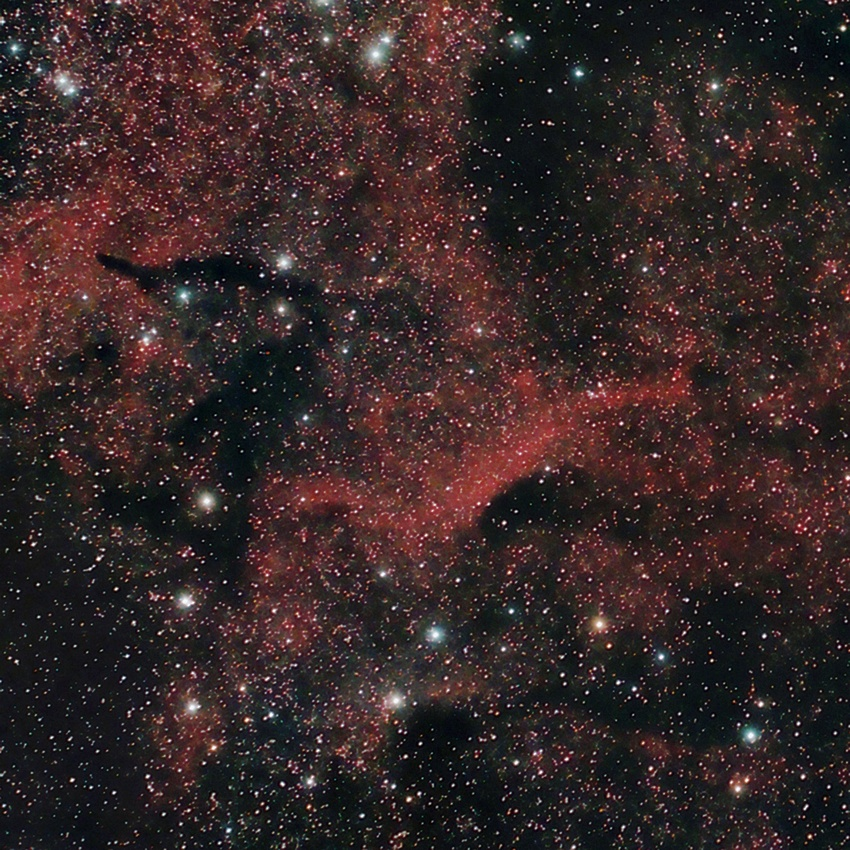
- Barnard 147 (upper left) and Barnard 146 (upper right)

Observation data: J2000.0 epoch
- Right ascension: 20^{h} 06^{m} 59.1^{s}
- Declination: +35° 12′ 34″
- Apparent magnitude (V): 8.3
- Apparent dimensions (V): 11 arcmins
- Constellation: Cygnus
- Designations: LDN 853, IRAS 20050+3503

Barnard 146
Dark nebula

Observation data: J2000.0 epoch
- Right ascension: 20^{h} 03^{m} 29^{s}
- Declination: +36° 1′
- Apparent magnitude (V): 7.0
- Constellation: Cygnus

Barnard 147 is a narrow, snake-like dark nebula in the constellation Cygnus. It is a well-defined dark lane near open cluster NGC 6871.

Barnard 146 is in close proximity to 147, to the SW of star BD +35 3930.
