= B01 =

B01 may refer to:

- ATC code B01 Antithrombotic agents, a subgroup of the Anatomical Therapeutic Chemical Classification System
- Center Counter Defense, an Encyclopaedia of Chess Openings designation
