= Seahorse Nebula =

Nebula in the constellation Cepheus

Barnard 150
Dark nebula
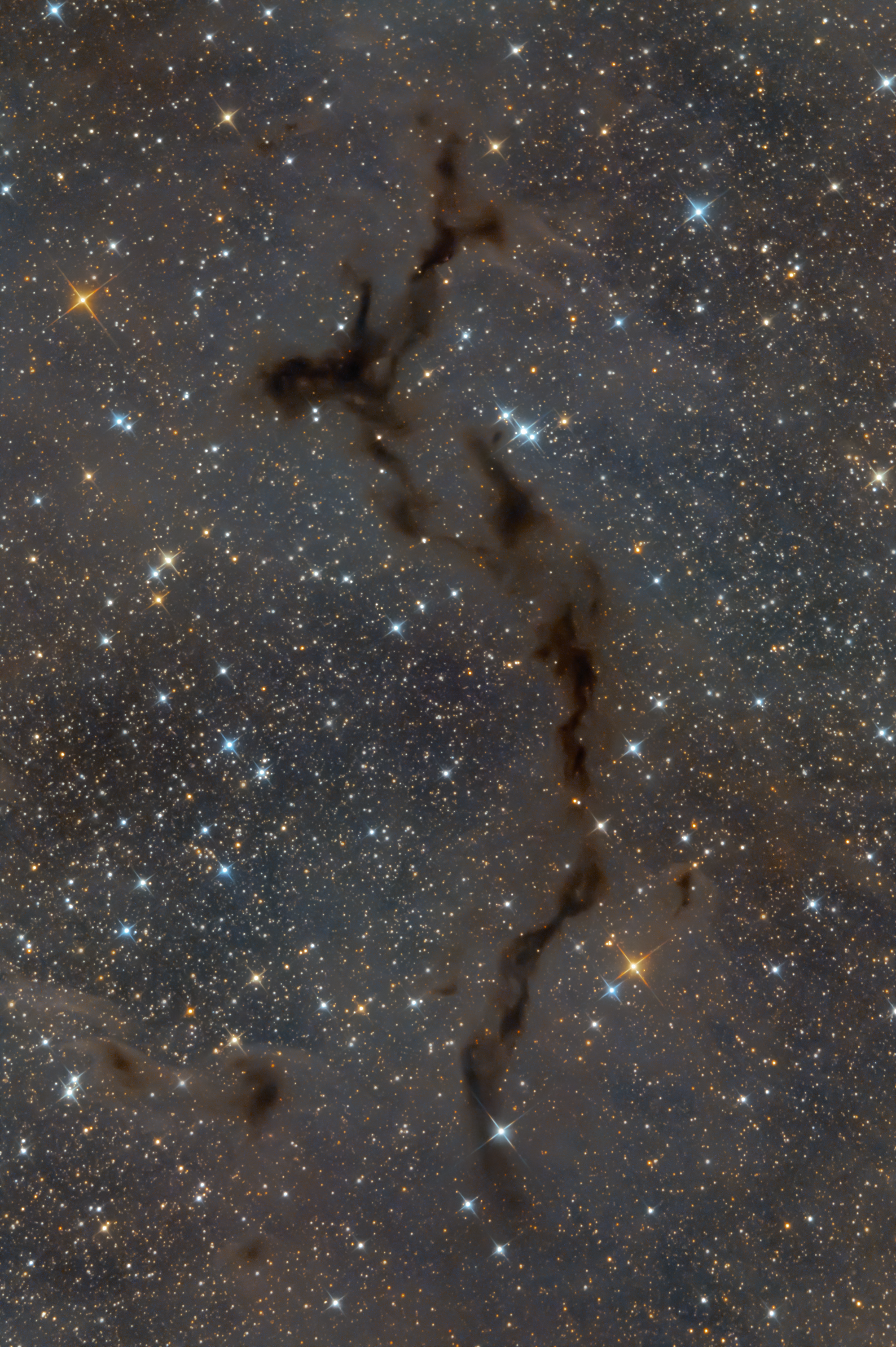
- The Seahorse Nebula taken by amateur astrophotographer Yann Sainty

Observation data: J2000 epoch
- Right ascension: 20^{h} 50^{m} 40^{s}
- Declination: 60° 18′ 00″
- Distance: 1200 ly (368 pc)
- Apparent dimensions (V): 1°
- Constellation: Cepheus

Barnard 150 is a dark nebula located in the constellation Cepheus 1200 light years away from Earth. It is also known as the Seahorse Nebula or the Dark Seahorse Nebula due to its shape.

== Characteristics ==
The nebula is about 1° long and it is formed by three dense gas cores labeled L1082 A, B and C. These dense gas cores are star formation regions.

== See also ==
- Barnard Catalogue
