= LDN 810 =

Dark nebula in the constellation of Vulpecula

Nebula
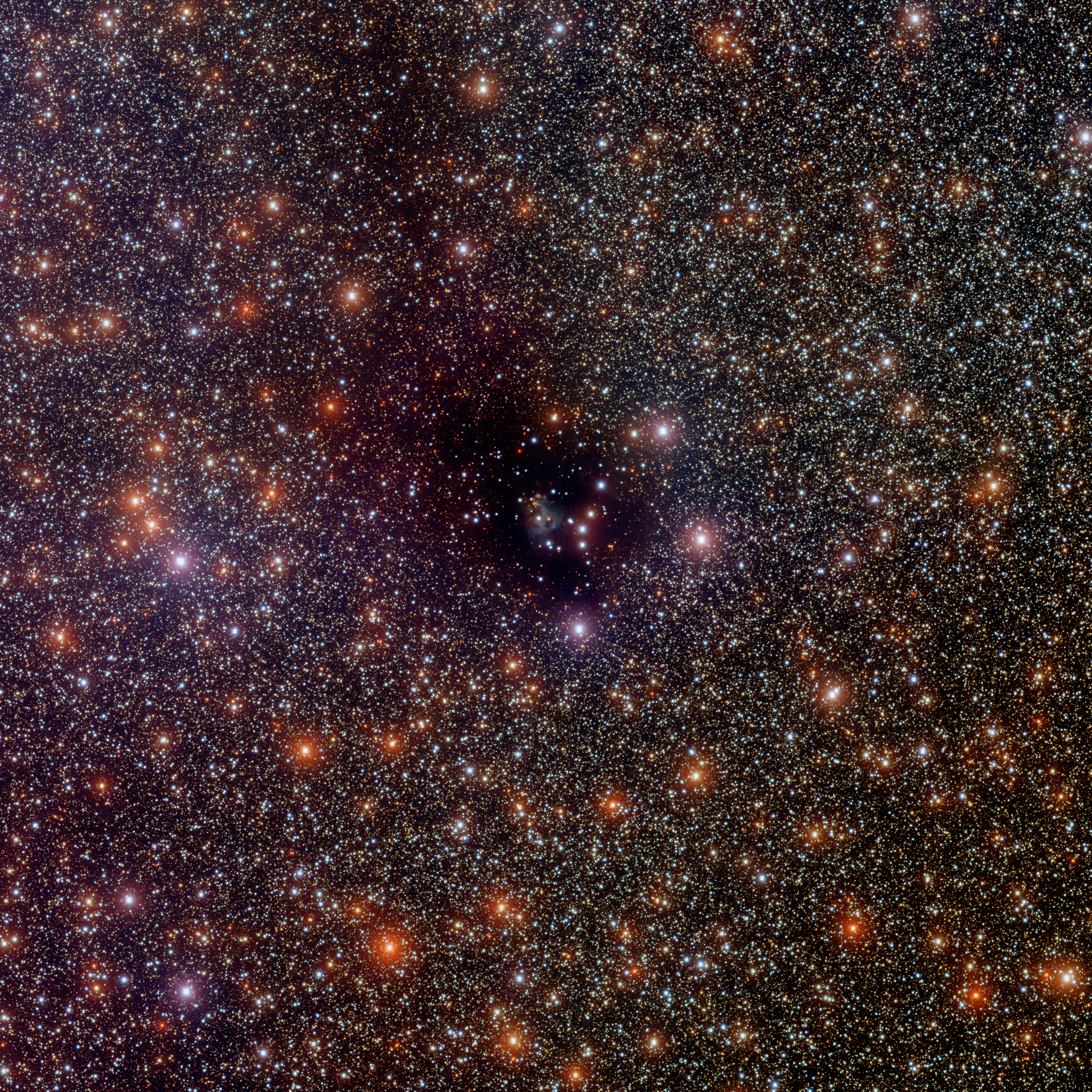
- Image of LDN 819 using the Mayall 4-meter telescope at Kitt Peak National Observatory

Observation data: J2000 epoch
- Subtype: Dark nebula
- Right ascension: 19 45 37.84
- Declination: 27° 56' 56.03"
- Constellation: Vulpecula

LDN 810 is a dark nebula located in the constellation of Vulpecula. Inside the nebula new star forming activity is creating an outflow of gas and a faint trail.

Located eastwards of LDN 810 is a faint emission nebula called Sh2-92.
