= Barnard 1 =

Dark nebula in the constellation of Perseus

Dark nebula

Observation data: J2000.0 epoch
- Right ascension: 03^{h} 33^{m} 16.3^{s}
- Declination: +31° 07′ 51″
- Distance: 800 ly
- Constellation: Perseus

Barnard 1 (B1) is a dark nebula in the constellation of Perseus. It belongs to the Perseus molecular cloud complex and is located at a distance of 800 light-years from the Sun. The Perseus molecular cloud has several regions in the neighborhood of the Sun that are actively forming low- and intermediate-mass stars. The Barnard 1 or Perseus molecular cloud complex is at right ascension 03^{h} 32^{m} and declination +31° 09′.

== Reflection nebula regions ==
Barnard 1 contains two reflection nebula regions: NGC 1333 and IC 348 are embedded in the Perseus molecular cloud complex.
