= Cinnamtannin B1 =

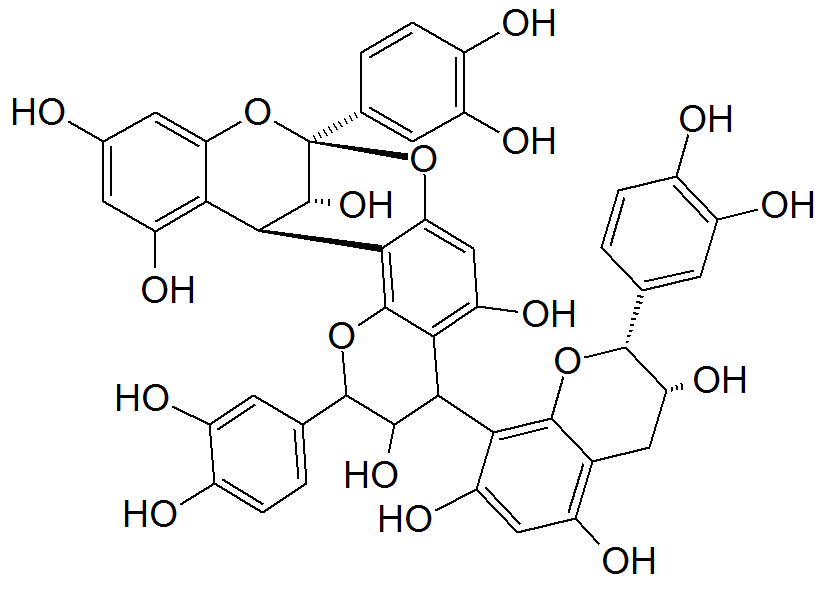
- Chemical structure of cinnamtannin B1

Names
- IUPAC name [(2S,3R,4R)-Flavan-3,3′,4′,5,7-pentol]-(2-oxy-7,8→4)-[(2R,3R,4S)-flavan-3,3′,4′,5-tetrol]-(4→8)-[(2R,3R)-flavan-3,3′,4′,5,7-pentol]
- Systematic IUPAC name (2R,3R,4S,8S,14R,15R)-2,8-Bis(3,4-dihydroxyphenyl)-4-[(2R,3R)-2-(3,4-dihydroxyphenyl)-3,5,7-trihydroxy-3,4-dihydro-2H-1-benzopyran-8-yl]-3,4-dihydro-2H,8H,14H-8,14-methanobenzo[d]pyrano[2,3-h][1,3]benzodioxocine-3,5,11,13,15-pentol

Identifiers
| CAS Number | 88082-60-4 |
| 3D model (JSmol) | Interactive image |
| ChemSpider | 417255 |
| PubChem CID | 475277 |
| UNII | H1059K9GIN |
- InChI: InChI=1S/C45H36O18/c46-18-10-27(54)33-31(11-18)62-45(17-3-6-22(49)26(53)9-17)44(59)38(33)36-32(63-45)14-29(56)35-37(39(58)41(61-43(35)36)16-2-5-21(48)25(52)8-16)34-28(55)13-23(50)19-12-30(57)40(60-42(19)34)15-1-4-20(47)24(51)7-15/h1-11,13-14,30,37-41,44,46-59H,12H2/t30-,37+,38-,39-,40-,41-,44-,45+/m1/s1 Key: BYSRPHRKESMCPO-LQNPQWRQSA-N; InChI=1/C45H36O18/c46-18-10-27(54)33-31(11-18)62-45(17-3-6-22(49)26(53)9-17)44(59)38(33)36-32(63-45)14-29(56)35-37(39(58)41(61-43(35)36)16-2-5-21(48)25(52)8-16)34-28(55)13-23(50)19-12-30(57)40(60-42(19)34)15-1-4-20(47)24(51)7-15/h1-11,13-14,30,37-41,44,46-59H,12H2/t30-,37+,38-,39-,40-,41-,44-,45+/m1/s1 Key: BYSRPHRKESMCPO-LQNPQWRQBE
- SMILES: Oc1cc(O)c2c(c1)O[C@@]1([C@@H]([C@H]2c2c(O1)cc(c1c2O[C@H](c2ccc(c(c2)O)O)[C@@H]([C@H]1c1c(O)cc(c2c1O[C@@H]([C@@H](C2)O)c1ccc(c(c1)O)O)O)O)O)O)c1ccc(c(c1)O)O

Properties
| Chemical formula | C_{45}H_{36}O_{18} |
| Molar mass | 864.75 g/mol |
- Except where otherwise noted, data are given for materials in their standard state (at 25 °C [77 °F], 100 kPa). verify (what is ?) Infobox references

Cinnamtannin B1 is a condensed tannin found in Cinnamomum verum. It falls under the category of type A proanthocyanidin.

Cinnamon could potentially exhibit pharmacological effects in treating type 2 diabetes mellitus and insulin resistance. The plant material predominantly employed in the study was sourced from Chinese cinnamon (see Chinese cinnamon's medicinal uses). Recent phytochemical research has suggested that cinnamtannin B1, extracted from C. Verum, might have a potential therapeutic impact on type 2 diabetes, with the exception of postmenopausal patients studied using Cinnamomum aromaticum.

Cinnamtannin B1 possesses multiple phenolic hydroxyl groups and is noted for its antioxidant properties, antimicrobial activities, and ability to inhibit platelet aggregation, which could contribute to the protection of damaged tissues in wounds.
