= List of stars in Cepheus =

This is the list of notable stars in the constellation Cepheus, sorted by decreasing brightness.

Name	B	F	Var	HD	HIP	RA	Dec	vis. mag.	abs. mag.	Dist. (ly)	Sp. class	Notes
α Cep	α	5		203280	105199	21^{h} 18^{m} 34.58^{s}	+62° 35′ 07.6″	2.45	1.58	49	A7IV-V	Alderamin; suspected variable
γ Cep	γ	35		222404	116727	23^{h} 39^{m} 20.98^{s}	+77° 37′ 55.1″	3.21	2.51	45	K1IV	Errai; binary star; has a planet (b); suspected variable
β Cep	β	8		205021	106032	21^{h} 28^{m} 39.58^{s}	+70° 33′ 38.5″	3.23	−3.08	595	B2IIIv SB	Alfirk; prototype β Cep variable, V_{max} = 3.16^{m}, V_{min} = 3.27^{m}, P = 0.19 d
ζ Cep	ζ	21		210745	109492	22^{h} 10^{m} 51.26^{s}	+58° 12′ 04.5″	3.39	−3.35	726	K1Ibv SB	eclipsing binary
η Cep	η	3		198149	102422	20^{h} 45^{m} 17.27^{s}	+61° 50′ 12.5″	3.41	2.63	47	K0IV	Al Kidr
ι Cep	ι	32		216228	112724	22^{h} 49^{m} 40.91^{s}	+66° 12′ 02.6″	3.50	0.76	115	K0III	
δ Cep A	δ	27		213306	110991	22^{h} 29^{m} 10.25^{s}	+58° 24′ 54.7″	4.07	−3.47	887	F5Iab + B7-8	prototype Cepheid variable, V_{max} = 3.49^{m}, V_{min} = 4.36^{m}, P = 5.37 d; binary star
ε Cep	ε	23		211336	109857	22^{h} 15^{m} 01.68^{s}	+57° 02′ 36.5″	4.18	2.13	84	F0IV	δ Sct variable, V_{max} = 4.15^{m}, V_{min} = 4.21^{m}, P = 0.04 d
θ Cep	θ	2		195725	101093	20^{h} 29^{m} 34.83^{s}	+62° 59′ 38.9″	4.21	1.11	136	A7III	Al Kidr
μ Cep	μ			206936	107259	21^{h} 43^{m} 30.45^{s}	+58° 46′ 48.2″	4.23	−6.81	5258	M2Ia	Garnet Star; in Trumpler 37; semiregular variable, V_{max} = 3.43^{m}, V_{min} = 5.1^{m}, P = 835 d
2 UMi	ω (Note: Labelled Omega Cephei (ω Cep/ω Cephei) by Bode in his Uranographia)	(2)		5848	5372	01^{h} 08^{m} 44.16^{s}	+86° 15′ 25.6″	4.24	−0.67	313	K2II-III	Tarandus
ν Cep	ν	10		207260	107418	21^{h} 45^{m} 26.93^{s}	+61° 07′ 14.9″	4.25	−6.72	5094	A2Ia	α Cyg variable, V_{max} = 4.25^{m}, V_{min} = 4.35^{m}
κ Cep	κ	1		192907	99255	20^{h} 08^{m} 53.32^{s}	+77° 42′ 40.9″	4.38	−0.63	327	B9III	triple star
π Cep	π	33		218658	114222	23^{h} 07^{m} 53.84^{s}	+75° 23′ 15.3″	4.41	0.27	220	G2III	triple star
ξ Cep A	ξ	17		209790	108917	22^{h} 03^{m} 47.45^{s}	+64° 37′ 40.7″	4.45		96	Am	Kurhah, component of the ξ Cep system; spectroscopic binary
HR 7955	υ (Note: Designated by Burrett in his atlas)			198084	102431	20^{h} 45^{m} 21.20^{s}	+57° 34′ 49.1″	4.52	2.35	88	F8IV-V	spectroscopic binary
11 Cep	τ (Note: Labelled Tau Cephei (τ Cep/τ Cephei) by Bode in his Uranographia)	11		206952	107119	21^{h} 41^{m} 55.08^{s}	+71° 18′ 40.3″	4.55	0.89	176	K0III	
HD 217382				217382	113116	22^{h} 54^{m} 24.38^{s}	+84° 20′ 46.0″	4.70	−0.69	390	K4III	variable star, ΔV = 0.004^{m}, P = 0.09 d
ο Cep	ο	34		219916	115088	23^{h} 18^{m} 37.41^{s}	+68° 06′ 41.1″	4.75	0.70	211	K0III	multiple star; suspected variable
9 Cep		9	V337	206165	106801	21^{h} 37^{m} 55.23^{s}	+62° 04′ 55.0″	4.76	−5.95	4528	B2Ib	α Cyg variable, V_{max} = 4.69^{m}, V_{min} = 4.78^{m}
HD 216446				216446	112519	22^{h} 47^{m} 28.95^{s}	+83° 09′ 13.4″	4.77	−0.22	324	K3III	double star
24 Cep	φ (Note: Labelled Phi Cephei (φ Cep/φ Cephei) by Bode in his Uranographia)	24		210807	109400	22^{h} 09^{m} 48.37^{s}	+72° 20′ 28.3″	4.79	−0.53	377	G8III	
16 Cep		16		209369	108535	21^{h} 59^{m} 15.10^{s}	+73° 10′ 49.0″	5.04	2.17	122	F5V	double star
OV Cep			OV	51802	37391	07^{h} 40^{m} 31.09^{s}	+87° 01′ 12.6″	5.05	−0.88	499	M2III	semiregular variable, V_{max} = 5.00^{m}, V_{min} = 5.07^{m}
λ Cep	λ	22		210839	109556	22^{h} 11^{m} 30.58^{s}	+59° 24′ 52.3″	5.05	−3.47	1646	O6If(n)	emission-line star; suspected variable
HD 223274	ψ (Note: Labelled Psi Cephei (ψ Cep/ψ Cephei) by Bode in his Uranographia)			223274	117371	23^{h} 47^{m} 54.75^{s}	+67° 48′ 24.5″	5.05	0.25	297	A1Vn	
19 Cep		19		209975	109017	22^{h} 05^{m} 08.79^{s}	+62° 16′ 47.4″	5.07	−6.04	5433	O9.5Ib	triple star
31 Cep		31		214470	111532	22^{h} 35^{m} 45.78^{s}	+73° 38′ 35.3″	5.08	1.32	184	F3III-IV	
HD 30338				30338	23265	05^{h} 00^{m} 20.72^{s}	+81° 11′ 38.5″	5.09	−0.03	345	K3III	
HD 25007				25007	19461	04^{h} 10^{m} 02.79^{s}	+80° 41′ 55.2″	5.10	−0.03	345	G8III+...	double star
VV Cep			VV	208816	108317	21^{h} 56^{m} 39.14^{s}	+63° 37′ 32.0″	5.11	−6.93	8359	M2 + B0	Algol and semiregular variable, V_{max} = 4.80^{m}, V_{min} = 5.36^{m}, P = 7430 d; one of the largest stars known
78 Dra		(78)		207130	107230	21^{h} 43^{m} 04.13^{s}	+72° 19′ 12.7″	5.18	0.78	247	K0III	
6 Cep		6	V382	203467	105268	21^{h} 19^{m} 22.21^{s}	+64° 52′ 18.6″	5.19	−2.41	1079	B3IVe	Be star, V_{max} = 5.08^{m}, V_{min} = 5.23^{m}
30 Cep		30		214734	111797	22^{h} 38^{m} 39.05^{s}	+63° 35′ 04.3″	5.19	0.23	320	A3IV	
HD 210855				210855	109572	22^{h} 11^{m} 48.52^{s}	+56° 50′ 20.6″	5.24	2.40	121	F8V	
HD 218029				218029	113864	23^{h} 03^{m} 32.85^{s}	+67° 12′ 33.1″	5.25	−0.11	384	K3III	
18 Cep	χ (Note: Labelled Chi Cephei (χ Cep/χ Cephei) by Bode in his Uranographia)	18	MO	209772	108924	22^{h} 03^{m} 52.93^{s}	+63° 07′ 11.2″	5.26	−0.43	448	M5III	slow irregular variable, V_{max} = 5.13^{m}, V_{min} = 5.33^{m}
20 Cep		20		209960	109005	22^{h} 05^{m} 00.48^{s}	+62° 47′ 07.9″	5.27	0.32	318	K4III	suspected variable
HD 212710				212710	109693	22^{h} 13^{m} 10.17^{s}	+86° 06′ 28.3″	5.27	0.80	256	B9.5Vn	
HD 210939				210939	109592	22^{h} 12^{m} 02.01^{s}	+60° 45′ 32.7″	5.37	0.08	373	K1III	
HD 26836				26836	20776	04^{h} 27^{m} 02.89^{s}	+80° 49′ 27.2″	5.42	−1.87	937	G6III:	
7 Cep		7		204770	105972	21^{h} 27^{m} 46.16^{s}	+66° 48′ 32.9″	5.42	−1.45	771	B7V	
HD 19978				19978	15547	03^{h} 20^{m} 19.58^{s}	+77° 44′ 05.6″	5.44	0.90	264	A6V	suspected variable
ρ^{2} Cep	ρ^{2}	29		213798	111056	22^{h} 29^{m} 52.97^{s}	+78° 49′ 27.6″	5.45	1.14	237	A3V	Al Kalb al Rai
HD 26659				26659	20982	04^{h} 30^{m} 00.60^{s}	+83° 20′ 24.5″	5.47	0.63	304	G8III	
HD 213022				213022	110725	22^{h} 26^{m} 00.78^{s}	+70° 46′ 15.2″	5.47	−0.54	520	K2III	
HD 18438				18438	14417	03^{h} 06^{m} 07.95^{s}	+79° 25′ 06.6″	5.49	−1.15	695	M1III	suspected variable
V408 Cep			V408	26356	20860	04^{h} 28^{m} 13.30^{s}	+83° 48′ 27.9″	5.51	−1.10	685	B5V	γ Cas variable
V381 Cep			V381	203338	105259	21^{h} 19^{m} 15.69^{s}	+58° 37′ 24.6″	5.51	−4.74	3663	M1Ibep	slow irregular variable, V_{max} = 5.51^{m}, V_{min} = 5.71^{m}
HD 210884				210884	109474	22^{h} 10^{m} 38.90^{s}	+70° 07′ 57.1″	5.52	2.95	107	F2V	
26 Cep		26		213087	110817	22^{h} 27^{m} 05.31^{s}	+65° 07′ 56.2″	5.52	−3.93	2527	B0.5Ib	suspected variable
HD 205139				205139	106227	21^{h} 30^{m} 59.29^{s}	+60° 27′ 34.0″	5.53	−3.80	2397	B1II	
12 Cep		12		207528	107586	21^{h} 47^{m} 25.31^{s}	+60° 41′ 33.7″	5.53	−0.25	467	M1III	
HD 200205				200205	103598	20^{h} 59^{m} 25.33^{s}	+59° 26′ 18.8″	5.54	−0.73	586	K4III	
14 Cep		14	LZ	209481	108772	22^{h} 02^{m} 04.58^{s}	+58° 00′ 01.3″	5.55	−5.22	4657	O9V	rotating ellipsoidal variable
V388 Cep			V388	219586	114831	23^{h} 15^{m} 37.71^{s}	+70° 53′ 17.1″	5.56	0.36	356	F0IV	δ Sct variable, ΔV = 0.07^{m}, P = 0.28 d
HD 221525				221525	115746	23^{h} 26^{m} 59.92^{s}	+87° 18′ 26.8″	5.56	0.69	307	A7IV	
HD 4853				4853	4283	00^{h} 54^{m} 52.76^{s}	+83° 42′ 26.9″	5.59	1.21	245	A4V	
4 Cep		4		197950	102253	20^{h} 43^{m} 10.98^{s}	+66° 39′ 26.5″	5.59	2.44	139	A8V	
HD 6798				6798	5626	01^{h} 12^{m} 16.51^{s}	+79° 40′ 26.3″	5.60	0.99	272	A3V	
HD 220974				220974	115770	23^{h} 27^{m} 16.42^{s}	+70° 21′ 35.3″	5.60	1.59	206	A6IV	
HD 216380				216380	112864	22^{h} 51^{m} 22.51^{s}	+61° 41′ 47.9″	5.61	1.39	227	G2IV+...	
HD 20084				20084	16489	03^{h} 32^{m} 19.72^{s}	+84° 54′ 40.9″	5.62	0.43	355	G3IIp...	
HD 202214				202214	104642	21^{h} 11^{m} 48.24^{s}	+59° 59′ 11.8″	5.64	−6.58	9056	B0V	suspected variable
HD 225216				225216	379	00^{h} 04^{m} 41.84^{s}	+67° 09′ 59.0″	5.68	0.74	317	K1III	
HD 208095				208095	107930	21^{h} 52^{m} 01.02^{s}	+55° 47′ 48.3″	5.70	−0.77	643	B6IV-V	suspected variable
HD 214035				214035	111242	22^{h} 32^{m} 16.27^{s}	+76° 13′ 35.3″	5.70	−1.07	736	A2V	
HD 206267				206267	106886	21^{h} 38^{m} 57.62^{s}	+57° 29′ 20.6″	5.74	−2.04	1173	O6V((f))+O9V	in Trumpler 37; triple star; suspected variable
13 Cep		13		208501	108165	21^{h} 54^{m} 53.16^{s}	+56° 36′ 40.4″	5.74	−3.71	2527	B8Ibvar	suspected variable
25 Cep		25		211833	110103	22^{h} 18^{m} 12.59^{s}	+62° 48′ 15.7″	5.75	−0.88	689	K3III	
HD 211029				211029	109620	22^{h} 12^{m} 22.45^{s}	+63° 17′ 27.9″	5.76	−1.36	865	M3III	variable star, ΔV = 0.021^{m}, P = 1.86 d
HR 774				16458	13055	02^{h} 47^{m} 47.63^{s}	+81° 26′ 55.2″	5.80	−0.12	498	G8p...	Prototypical Barium star
HD 214710				214710	111660	22^{h} 37^{m} 12.86^{s}	+75° 22′ 18.5″	5.80	−0.61	623	M1III	
HD 192781				192781	99663	20^{h} 13^{m} 27.57^{s}	+60° 38′ 25.6″	5.81	−0.49	594	K5III	
HD 200614				200614	103810	21^{h} 02^{m} 09.00^{s}	+56° 40′ 10.6″	5.83	−0.92	729	B8III	
ρ^{1} Cep	ρ^{1}	28		213403	110787	22^{h} 26^{m} 42.45^{s}	+78° 47′ 09.4″	5.83	1.85	204	A2m	
HD 22701				22701	19454	04^{h} 10^{m} 00.22^{s}	+86° 37′ 34.9″	5.84	2.78	133	F5IV	
HD 208682				208682	108226	21^{h} 55^{m} 30.99^{s}	+65° 19′ 14.9″	5.84	−2.00	1203	B2.5Ve	suspected variable
HD 221861				221861	116380	23^{h} 34^{m} 59.03^{s}	+71° 38′ 31.4″	5.86	−3.86	2860	K0Ib	
HD 201636				201636	104171	21^{h} 06^{m} 23.39^{s}	+71° 25′ 55.5″	5.88	2.42	160	F3IV	
HD 211554				211554	109972	22^{h} 16^{m} 26.51^{s}	+57° 13′ 12.8″	5.88	−0.86	728	G8III	
HD 217157				217157	112833	22^{h} 51^{m} 02.94^{s}	+85° 22′ 24.5″	5.89	0.16	457	K5	
HD 219485				219485	114745	23^{h} 14^{m} 37.02^{s}	+74° 13′ 52.5″	5.89	0.16	455	A0V	
V414 Cep			V414	197939	102358	20^{h} 44^{m} 22.04^{s}	+56° 29′ 18.3″	5.91	−1.45	964	M3III	semiregular variable
77 Dra		(77)		201908	104105	21^{h} 05^{m} 29.21^{s}	+78° 07′ 34.8″	5.91	0.40	412	B8Vn	
HD 18778				18778	14844	03^{h} 11^{m} 42.85^{s}	+81° 28′ 14.6″	5.92	1.96	202	A7III-IV	suspected variable
HD 203399				203399	104968	21^{h} 15^{m} 42.39^{s}	+77° 00′ 44.1″	5.92	−1.12	836	K5III	suspected variable
HD 207198				207198	107374	21^{h} 44^{m} 53.28^{s}	+62° 27′ 38.1″	5.94	−3.01	2012	O9II	
HD 222386				222386	116714	23^{h} 39^{m} 10.16^{s}	+75° 17′ 34.3″	5.95	1.42	263	A3V	
HD 223128				223128	117265	23^{h} 46^{m} 36.73^{s}	+66° 46′ 56.1″	5.95	−2.68	1734	B2IV	
HD 209112				209112	108505	21^{h} 58^{m} 53.51^{s}	+62° 41′ 52.6″	5.96	−2.02	1283	M3III	variable star, ΔV = 0.020^{m}, P = 1.76 d
HD 205072				205072	105727	21^{h} 24^{m} 49.40^{s}	+80° 31′ 29.5″	5.97	0.78	355	G6III:	
HD 222387				222387	116728	23^{h} 39^{m} 21.17^{s}	+74° 00′ 09.4″	5.98	0.43	419	G8III	
HD 200039				200039	103219	20^{h} 54^{m} 44.28^{s}	+75° 55′ 31.7″	5.99	0.37	434	G5III	
HD 202987				202987	105080	21^{h} 17^{m} 14.23^{s}	+55° 47′ 52.7″	6.00	−2.28	1475	K3III	
HD 431				431	760	00^{h} 09^{m} 19.83^{s}	+79° 42′ 52.7″	6.01	0.67	381	A7IV	
HD 213973				213973	111314	22^{h} 33^{m} 02.70^{s}	+69° 54′ 48.1″	6.01	1.60	249	A9III	
HD 216595				216595	112998	22^{h} 53^{m} 03.77^{s}	+60° 06′ 03.7″	6.01	−1.99	1299	K2V:	
HD 197373				197373	102011	20^{h} 40^{m} 17.88^{s}	+60° 30′ 17.3″	6.02	3.41	108	F6IV	
HD 12005				12005	9568	02^{h} 02^{m} 57.04^{s}	+77° 54′ 58.6″	6.04	−1.55	1076	K0	
HD 212495				212495	110498	22^{h} 23^{m} 00.50^{s}	+62° 25′ 09.6″	6.04	−0.66	712	A1V	
HD 12467				12467	10054	02^{h} 09^{m} 25.44^{s}	+81° 17′ 45.3″	6.05	1.87	223	A1V	
HD 8065				8065	6522	01^{h} 23^{m} 46.82^{s}	+78° 43′ 33.8″	6.07	−8.93	32600	A0Iab	suspected variable
HD 216102				216102	112635	22^{h} 48^{m} 44.24^{s}	+62° 56′ 18.7″	6.07	−0.39	639	K0	
HD 206842				206842	107197	21^{h} 42^{m} 45.37^{s}	+59° 16′ 15.0″	6.10	−3.26	2433	K1III	
HD 203574				203574	105370	21^{h} 20^{m} 33.50^{s}	+60° 45′ 23.2″	6.11	0.51	429	G5III	
V426 Cep			V426	204599	105949	21^{h} 27^{m} 25.30^{s}	+59° 45′ 00.4″	6.11	−1.28	982	M3II-III...	slow irregular variable
HD 211300				211300	109659	22^{h} 12^{m} 52.72^{s}	+73° 18′ 25.7″	6.11	−1.05	881	A3V+...	suspected variable
HD 203501				203501	104756	21^{h} 13^{m} 21.60^{s}	+81° 13′ 51.5″	6.12	0.14	512	A3IV	
HD 211242				211242	109746	22^{h} 13^{m} 49.71^{s}	+63° 09′ 44.5″	6.13	−1.23	967	B8Vn	
HD 204754				204754	106052	21^{h} 28^{m} 52.72^{s}	+55° 25′ 07.2″	6.14	−1.13	929	B8III	
HD 36905				36905	28532	06^{h} 01^{m} 20.17^{s}	+85° 10′ 55.6″	6.17	−1.89	1336	M0III	
HD 197734				197734	102216	20^{h} 42^{m} 39.69^{s}	+60° 36′ 04.9″	6.17	−0.56	724	A2IV	
HD 208606				208606	108209	21^{h} 55^{m} 20.60^{s}	+61° 32′ 30.5″	6.17	−6.05	9056	G8Ib...	
HD 207780				207780	107723	21^{h} 49^{m} 19.01^{s}	+61° 16′ 22.1″	6.18	−0.96	872	M1II-III	suspected variable
HD 212454				212454	110497	22^{h} 23^{m} 00.17^{s}	+57° 17′ 04.6″	6.18	−0.90	851	B8III-IV	
HD 216172				216172	112670	22^{h} 49^{m} 00.68^{s}	+68° 34′ 12.2″	6.19	2.21	204	F5	
HD 6319				6319	5928	01^{h} 16^{m} 12.60^{s}	+87° 08′ 44.0″	6.20	1.20	326	K2III:	
HD 218560				218560	114227	23^{h} 07^{m} 57.20^{s}	+64° 13′ 21.2″	6.21	−1.36	1065	K0	
HD 199661				199661	103346	20^{h} 56^{m} 17.01^{s}	+56° 53′ 15.0″	6.23	−0.71	795	B2.5IV	suspected variable
HD 6473				6473	5412	01^{h} 09^{m} 12.29^{s}	+80° 00′ 42.0″	6.24	0.46	468	K0	
HD 218537				218537	114212	23^{h} 07^{m} 47.74^{s}	+63° 38′ 00.5″	6.25	−1.62	1221	B3V	suspected variable
HD 214019				214019	111325	22^{h} 33^{m} 16.76^{s}	+70° 22′ 25.3″	6.26	0.82	400	A0V	
HD 7238				7238	5947	01^{h} 16^{m} 31.04^{s}	+79° 54′ 35.5″	6.27	1.98	236	F5Vs	
HD 210905				210905	109585	22^{h} 11^{m} 56.74^{s}	+59° 05′ 03.8″	6.29	1.16	345	K0III	
HD 213232				213242	110919	22^{h} 28^{m} 19.48^{s}	+64° 05′ 06.8″	6.30	0.99	377	K0	
V398 Cep			V398	225136	302	00^{h} 03^{m} 51.63^{s}	+66° 42′ 43.9″	6.31	−1.09	985	M4	semiregular variable
δ Cep C	δ	27		213307	110988	22^{h} 29^{m} 09.23^{s}	+58° 24′ 14.7″	6.30		887	B7IV	Component of the δ Cep system; spectroscopic binary; suspected variable
HD 209258				209258	108420	21^{h} 57^{m} 51.07^{s}	+74° 59′ 48.3″	6.32	−1.35	1113	K5	suspected variable
V379 Cep			V379	197770	102258	20^{h} 43^{m} 13.69^{s}	+57° 06′ 50.4″	6.32	−5.10	6269	B2III	Algol variable, ΔV = 0.047^{m}, P = 99.76 d
HD 215907				215907	112508	22^{h} 47^{m} 23.23^{s}	+58° 28′ 58.8″	6.33	−1.01	956	B9.5IV	
ξ Cep B	ξ	17		209791		22^{h} 03^{m} 46.22^{s}	+64° 37′ 41.5″	6.34		96	F8V	component of the ξ Cep system; spectroscopic binary
HD 210220				210220	109190	22^{h} 07^{m} 09.65^{s}	+58° 50′ 26.8″	6.34	0.16	560	G6III	
HD 1141				1141	1296	00^{h} 16^{m} 13.88^{s}	+76° 57′ 02.7″	6.35	−0.04	617	B9Vn	
HD 219841				219841	114984	23^{h} 17^{m} 18.86^{s}	+75° 17′ 56.5″	6.35	−0.07	628	A2Vs	
80 Dra		(80)		210873	109434	22^{h} 10^{m} 15.32^{s}	+72° 06′ 40.7″	6.36	0.38	511	B9MNp...	
HR 9038				223778	117712	23^{h} 52^{m} 24.52^{s}	+75° 32′ 40.2″	6.36	6.19	35	K3V	
HD 208132				208132	107893	21^{h} 51^{m} 37.25^{s}	+65° 45′ 09.9″	6.37	1.86	260	Am+...	
HD 3440				3440	3132	00^{h} 39^{m} 47.75^{s}	+82° 29′ 36.9″	6.38	3.83	105	F6V:	
HD 202582				202582	104788	21^{h} 13^{m} 42.46^{s}	+64° 24′ 15.1″	6.38	3.30	135	G2IV+...	suspected variable
V444 Cep			V444	210071	109124	22^{h} 06^{m} 13.55^{s}	+56° 20′ 36.2″	6.38	0.14	576	A0III	rotating ellipsoidal variable
HD 25904				25904	20039	04^{h} 17^{m} 51.85^{s}	+80° 32′ 08.7″	6.39	−0.92	945	K0	
HD 208947				208947	108364	21^{h} 57^{m} 11.09^{s}	+66° 09′ 22.2″	6.41	−2.06	1614	B2V	
V421 Cep			V421	203025	105091	21^{h} 17^{m} 18.79^{s}	+58° 36′ 41.4″	6.42	−3.03	2527	B2III	Be star
V422 Cep			V422	203265	105193	21^{h} 18^{m} 32.43^{s}	+61° 11′ 03.8″	6.43	−2.03	1606	M3	slow irregular variable
V438 Cep			V438	209111	108133	21^{h} 54^{m} 26.54^{s}	+80° 18′ 30.9″	6.43	−0.59	825	M3	semiregular variable
RW Cep			RW	212466	110504	22^{h} 23^{m} 07.02^{s}	+55° 57′ 47.6″	6.44	−3.18	2739	G8Ia	semiregular variable, V_{max} = 6.0^{m}, V_{min} = 7.3^{m}, P = 346 d; one of the largest stars known
HD 12918				12918	10623	02^{h} 16^{m} 45.27^{s}	+83° 33′ 41.5″	6.45	0.86	428	K0	
HD 198781				198781	102771	20^{h} 49^{m} 17.39^{s}	+64° 02′ 32.2″	6.45	−3.03	2567	B0.5V	suspected variable
HD 207636				207636	107555	21^{h} 47^{m} 00.87^{s}	+70° 09′ 03.4″	6.45	0.55	492	A0V	
HD 215588				215588	112324	22^{h} 45^{m} 03.70^{s}	+58° 08′ 50.6″	6.45	3.68	117	F5	
HD 12927				12927	10309	02^{h} 12^{m} 49.98^{s}	+79° 41′ 29.3″	6.46	0.96	410	A3	suspected variable
HD 212136				212136	110314	22^{h} 20^{m} 38.77^{s}	+58° 24′ 35.5″	6.46	0.15	597	G8III	
HD 217348				217348	113498	22^{h} 59^{m} 09.00^{s}	+59° 48′ 52.8″	6.46	−1.29	1156	B9III	
V431 Cep			V431	205938	106604	21^{h} 35^{m} 25.91^{s}	+68° 13′ 09.3″	6.47	0.08	617	Ap Si	α² CVn variable
HD 207826				207826	107710	21^{h} 49^{m} 08.12^{s}	+66° 47′ 31.9″	6.49	1.57	314	F3IV	
HD 224890				224890	128	00^{h} 01^{m} 39.30^{s}	+73° 36′ 42.8″	6.50	2.41	214	Am...	
HD 32196				32196	25911	05^{h} 31^{m} 48.00^{s}	+85° 56′ 19.4″	6.50	1.51	324	A5m	
HD 198236				198236	102370	20^{h} 44^{m} 33.08^{s}	+69° 45′ 06.8″	6.50	0.89	431	G8III	
V Cep			V	224309	118027	23^{h} 56^{m} 27.56^{s}	+83° 11′ 28.0″	6.57	1.75	301	A3V	not variable
V419 Cep			V419	202380	104719	21^{h} 12^{m} 47.25^{s}	+60° 05′ 52.8″	6.62		5200	M2Ib	slow irregular variable
79 Dra		(79)		208509	107995	21^{h} 52^{m} 46.94^{s}	+73° 42′ 08.2″	6.65	2.21	276	A2V	
15 Cep	σ (Note: Labelled Sigma Cephei (σ Cep/σ Cephei) by Bode in his Uranographia)	15		209744	108925	22^{h} 03^{m} 53.86^{s}	+59° 48′ 52.5″	6.69	−1.43	1370	B1V	multiple star
AH Cep			AH	216014	112562	22^{h} 47^{m} 52.94^{s}	+65° 03′ 43.8″	6.88		3330	B0.5V+...	β Lyr variable, V_{max} = 6.78^{m}, V_{min} = 7.07^{m}, P = 1.77 d
U Cep			U	5679	4843	01^{h} 02^{m} 18.34^{s}	+81° 52′ 32.1″	6.90	0.32	674	G8III	Algol variable, V_{max} = 6.75^{m}, V_{min} = 9.24^{m}, P = 2.49 d
HD 12648				12648	10800	02^{h} 19^{m} 00.0^{s}	+85° 44′ 10″	6.98		517	G5	has a planet (b)
HD 202432				202432	104632	21^{h} 11^{m} 40.4^{s}	+70° 26′ 28″	7.00		525	K2 D	has a planet (b)
EM Cep			EM	208392	108073	21^{h} 53^{m} 48.10^{s}	+62° 36′ 51.9″	7.03		1610	B1Vn	W UMa variable, V_{max} = 7.02^{m}, V_{min} = 7.17^{m}, P = 0.81 d
SS Cep			SS	22689	17881	03^{h} 49^{m} 30.01^{s}	+80° 19′ 20.9″	7.16		847	M5III	semiregular variable, V_{max} = 6.5^{m}, V_{min} = 7.7^{m}, P = 90 d
DQ Cep			DQ	199908	103471	20^{h} 57^{m} 48.61^{s}	+55° 29′ 15.6″	7.26		579	F1IV	δ Sct variable, V_{max} = 7.22^{m}, V_{min} = 7.32^{m}, P = 0.079 d
HD 204521				204521	105766	21^{h} 25^{m} 16.80^{s}	+70° 28′ 39.1″	7.29		86	G0V_Fe-08	Will pass near the Sun in the future
HD 207538				207538	107598	21^{h} 47^{m} 39.79^{s}	+59° 12′ 01.3″	7.30			O9.7IV	peculiar metal abundances
T Cep			T	202012	104451	21^{h} 09^{m} 32.00^{s}	+68° 29′ 25.0″	7.33		612	M6-9e	Mira variable, V_{max} = 5.2^{m}, V_{min} = 11.3^{m}, P = 388.14 d
V380 Cep			V380	200775	103763	21^{h} 01^{m} 36.92^{s}	+68° 09′ 47.8″	7.36		1720	B2Ve	in NGC 7023; Orion variable, V_{max} = 7.24^{m}, V_{min} = 7.42^{m}
VW Cep			VW	197433	101750	20^{h} 37^{m} 21.54^{s}	+75° 36′ 01.5″	7.38		90	G8V+K0V	W UMa variable, V_{max} = 7.23^{m}, V_{min} = 7.68^{m}, P = 0.28 d
S Cep			S	206362	106583	21^{h} 25^{m} 12.83^{s}	+78° 37′ 28.2″	7.40		1330	C7,4e	Mira variable, V_{max} = 7.4^{m}, V_{min} = 12.9^{m}, P = 486.84 d
HD 1				1	422	00^{h} 05^{m} 08.84^{s}	+67° 50′ 23.97″	7.42	-0.01	1,190	G9-K0IIIa	spectroscopic binary
NY Cep			NY	217312	113461	22^{h} 58^{m} 39.80^{s}	+63° 04′ 37.7″	7.44			B0IV	Algol variable, V_{max} = 7.4^{m}, V_{min} = 7.55^{m}, P = 15.28 d
V368 Cep			V368	220140	115147	23^{h} 19^{m} 26.63^{s}	+79° 00′ 12.7″	7.54		63	G9V	RS CVn variable
W Cep			W	214369	111592	22^{h} 36^{m} 27.56^{s}	+58° 25′ 33.9″	7.59			K0Iapev...	semiregular variable, V_{max} = 7.02^{m}, V_{min} = 8.5^{m}, P = 350 d
EI Cep			EI	205234	106024	21^{h} 28^{m} 28.21^{s}	+76° 24′ 12.6″	7.61		657	F3V+F1m	Algol variable, V_{max} = 7.54^{m}, V_{min} = 8.06^{m}, P = 8.44 d
CW Cep			CW	218066	113907	23^{h} 04^{m} 02.22^{s}	+63° 23′ 48.8″	7.67		2080	B0.5V+B1V	in Cepheus OB3; Algol variable, V_{max} = 7.6^{m}, V_{min} = 8.04^{m}, P = 2.73 d
IR Cep			IR	208960	108426	21^{h} 57^{m} 51.93^{s}	+61° 01′ 07.9″	7.86		2200	G0	classical Cepheid, V_{max} = 7.58^{m}, V_{min} = 7.98^{m}, P = 2.11 d
EK Cep			EK	206821	107083	21^{h} 41^{m} 21.50^{s}	+69° 41′ 34.1″	7.89		528	A0V	Algol variable
HD 204827				204827	106059	21^{h} 28^{m} 57.76^{s}	+58° 44′ 23.2″	7.94			O9V+B0.5III	in Trumpler 37; spectroscopic binary
XZ Cep			XZ		111257	22^{h} 32^{m} 25.08^{s}	+67° 09′ 02.5″	8.51		1730	O9.5V	β Lyr variable, V_{max} = 8^{m}, V_{min} = 8.83^{m}, P = 5.10 d
HD 211810				211810	110094	22^{h} 18^{m} 07.0^{s}	+61° 08′ 04″	8.59		199	G5	has a planet (b)
ZZ Cep			ZZ	215661	112317	22^{h} 45^{m} 02.61^{s}	+68° 07′ 58.4″	8.60		430	B7v+...	Algol variable, V_{max} = 8.6^{m}, V_{min} = 9.55^{m}, P = 2.14 d
DH Cep			DH	215835	112470	22^{h} 46^{m} 54.11^{s}	+58° 05′ 03.5″	8.61		5000	O5.5V+O6V	in NGC 7380; rotating ellipsoidal variable, V_{max} = 8.58^{m}, V_{min} = 8.62^{m}, P = 2.11 d
CQ Cep			CQ	214419	111633	22^{h} 36^{m} 53.95^{s}	+56° 54′ 21.0″	8.80			WN6+O9II-Ib	β Lyr variable, V_{max} = 8.63^{m}, V_{min} = 9.12^{m}, P = 1.64 d
WX Cep			WX	213631	111166	22^{h} 31^{m} 15.79^{s}	+63° 31′ 23.6″	9.00		1520	A5V+A2V	Algol variable, V_{max} = 8.7^{m}, V_{min} = 9.29^{m}, P = 3.38 d
HD 211853			GP	211853	100154	22^{h} 18^{m} 45.61^{s}	+56° 07′ 33.9″	9.00		1450	WN6o+O6I	eclipsing binary, V_{max} = 8.96^{m}, V_{min} = 9.07^{m}, P = 6.69 d
XX Cep			XX	222217	116648	23^{h} 38^{m} 20.29^{s}	+64° 20′ 02.7″	9.18		799	A7V	Algol variable, V_{max} = 9.20^{m}, V_{min} = 10.32^{m}, P = 2.34 d
RZ Cep			RZ		111839	22^{h} 39^{m} 13.18^{s}	+64° 51′ 30.6″	9.19			A0-F2	RR Lyr variable, V_{max} = 9.15^{m}, V_{min} = 9.72^{m}, P = 0.31 d
IL Cep			IL		113017	22^{h} 53^{m} 15.60^{s}	+62° 08′ 45.0″	9.31		2790	B3IVe+A3	UX Ori star, V_{max} = 9.24^{m}, V_{min} = 9.61^{m}
EG Cep			EG	194089		20^{h} 15^{m} 56.83^{s}	+76° 48′ 35.7″	9.49			A7V	β Lyr variable, V_{max} = 9.31^{m}, V_{min} = 10.21^{m}, P = 0.54 d
Kruger 60 A				239960	110893	22^{h} 27^{m} 59.47^{s}	+57° 41′ 45.2″	9.59	11.58	13.1	M2.0V	one of the nearest known stars; member of the Kruger 60 system
HIP 109384					109384	22^{h} 08^{m} 32.0^{s}	+71° 18′ 52″	9.63		183	G5	has a planet (b)
CR Cep			CR	240059	112430	22^{h} 46^{m} 24.77^{s}	+59° 26′ 31.9″	9.64		1760	G0	classical Cepheid, V_{max} = 9.43^{m}, V_{min} = 9.83^{m}, P = 6.23 d
PQ Cep			PQ			21^{h} 44^{m} 28.78^{s}	+73° 38′ 04.9″	9.82			C6-,3e	Mira variable
HD 219460			V458	219460	114791	23^{h} 15^{m} 12.39^{s}	+60° 27′ 01.8″	9.89			WN5+B1III	Wolf–Rayet star
4U 2206+54						22^{h} 07^{m} 56.24^{s}	+54° 31′ 06.4″	9.90			O9.5Vep	high-mass X-ray binary, V_{max} = 9.7^{m}, V_{min} = 9.9^{m}
SV Cep			SV			22^{h} 21^{m} 33.20^{s}	+73° 40′ 27.1″	10.35			A2IVe	UX Ori star, V_{max} = 10.35^{m}, V_{min} = 12.15^{m}
V354 Cephei			V354			22^{h} 33^{m} 35^{s}	+58° 53′ 45″	10.90		9000	M2.5 Iab	One of the largest known stars; slow irregular variable, V_{max} = 10.82^{m}, V_{min} = 11.35^{m}
DO Cep			DO	239960		22^{h} 27^{m} 59.57^{s}	+57° 41′ 45.3″	10.30		13.1	M4.0V	member of the Kruger 60 system; flare star, V_{max} = 10.3^{m}, V_{min} = 11.4^{m}
CP Cep			CP		108427	21^{h} 57^{m} 52.69^{s}	+56° 09′ 50.1″	10.58		1360	F5Ib	classical Cepheid, V_{max} = 10.06^{m}, V_{min} = 10.96^{m}, P = 17.86 d
AK Cep			AK		110964	22^{h} 28^{m} 50.09^{s}	+58° 12′ 39.4″	10.86		713	F8	classical Cepheid, V_{max} = 10.86^{m}, V_{min} = 11.52^{m}, P = 7.23 d
EE Cep			EE			22^{h} 09^{m} 22.76^{s}	+55° 45′ 24.2″	10.9			B5:nev	Algol variable, V_{max} = 10.72^{m}, V_{min} = 12.15^{m}, P = 2049.53 d
BH Cep			BH			22^{h} 01^{m} 42.87^{s}	+69° 44′ 36.5″	11.01			F5IIIe	UX Ori star, V_{max} = 10.79^{m}, V_{min} = 12.7^{m}
GW Cep			GW			01^{h} 45^{m} 58.58^{s}	+80° 04′ 55.3″	11.21			G3	W UMa variable
WZ Cep			WZ			23^{h} 22^{m} 24.22^{s}	+72° 54′ 56.7″	11.23			F5	W UMa variable
BO Cep			BO			22^{h} 16^{m} 54.06^{s}	+70° 03′ 45.0″	11.55			F5Ve	UX Ori star, V_{max} = 11.5^{m}, V_{min} = 12.4^{m}
WR 152				211564		22^{h} 16^{m} 24.04^{s}	+55° 37′ 36.7″	11.61			WN3	Wolf–Rayet star
DI Cep			DI		113269	22^{h} 56^{m} 11.53^{s}	+58° 40′ 01.8″	11.95		797	G8IVe	T Tauri star
CX Cep			CX			22^{h} 09^{m} 33.44^{s}	+57° 44′ 30.5″	12.12			WN4+O5V	β Lyr variable, V_{max} = 12.09^{m}, V_{min} = 12.24^{m}, P = 2.13 d
Wolf 1106						21^{h} 07^{m} 55.40^{s}	+59° 43′ 19.3″	13.23		79	sdM1.5	One of first three subdwarfs discovered
Cepheus X-4			V490			21^{h} 39^{m} 30.68^{s}	+56° 59′ 10.5″				B1.5Ve	in IC 1396; high-mass X-ray binary
V350 Cep			V350			20^{h} 43^{m} 00.01^{s}	+66° 11′ 28.0″	16.20		M2...	WN4+O5V	in NGC 7129; T Tauri star
PV Cep			PV			20^{h} 45^{m} 53.94^{s}	+67° 57′ 38.7″	17.46			A5	in nebula GM 1-29; EXor
FR Cep			FR			20^{h} 55^{m} 46.66^{s}	+68° 12′ 36.9″					Classical Cepheid Variable
IV Cep			IV			22^{h} 04^{m} 36.92^{s}	+53° 30′ 23.7″					nova
Cepheus A HW 2						22^{h} 56^{m} 17.9^{s}	+62° 01′ 49″				B0.5	in Cepheus A; massive protostar
S140 IRS 1						22^{h} 19^{m} 18.28^{s}	+63° 18′ 45.8″					in S140; protostar
IRAS 21391+5802						21^{h} 40^{m} 42.36^{s}	+58° 16′ 09.7″					in IC 1396N; protostar
NGC 7538 IRS 1						23^{h} 13^{m} 45.32^{s}	+61° 28′ 11.7″				O	in NGC 7538; massive protostar
NGC 7538 IRS 9						23^{h} 14^{m} 01.63^{s}	+61° 27′ 20.2″					in NGC 7538; massive protostar
OH 104.9+2.4						22^{h} 19^{m} 27.48^{s}	+59° 51′ 21.7″					OH/IR star
PSR B2224+65						22^{h} 25^{m} 52.36^{s}	+65° 35′ 33.8″					pulsar
PSR J2229+6114						22^{h} 29^{m} 04.97^{s}	+61° 14′ 12.9″					pulsar
Table legend: • Name = Proper name • B = Bayer designation • F or/and G. = Flamsteed designation or Gould designation • Var = Variable-star designation • HD = Henry Draper Catalogue designation number • HIP = Hipparcos Catalogue designation number • RA = Right ascension for the Epoch/Equinox J2000.0 • Dec = Declination for the Epoch/Equinox J2000.0 • vis. mag. = visual magnitude (m or m_{v}), also known as apparent magnitude • abs. mag. = absolute magnitude (M_{v}) • Dist. (ly) = Distance in light-years from Earth • Sp. class = Spectral class of the star in the stellar classification system • Notes = Common name(s) or alternate name(s); comments; notable properties [for example: multiple star status, range of variability if it is a variable star, exoplanets, etc.]

== See also ==
- List of stars by constellation
