= Cepheus in Chinese astronomy =

The modern constellation Cepheus lies across one of the quadrants symbolized by the Black Tortoise of the North (北方玄武, Běi Fāng Xuán Wǔ), and Three Enclosures (三垣, Sān Yuán), that divide the sky in traditional Chinese uranography.

The name of the western constellation in modern Chinese is 仙王座 (xiān wáng zuò), meaning "the immortal king constellation".

== Stars ==
The map of Chinese constellation in constellation Cepheus area consists of :

| Four Symbols | Mansion (Chinese name) | Romanization | Translation | Asterisms (Chinese name) | Romanization | Translation | Western star name | Proper Name | Chinese star name | Romanization | Translation |
|---|---|---|---|---|---|---|---|---|---|---|---|
| Three Enclosures (三垣) | 紫微垣 | Zǐ Wēi Yuán | Purple Forbidden enclosure | 紫微左垣 | Zǐwēizuǒyuán | Left Wall | | | | | |
| Three Enclosures (三垣) | 紫微垣 | Zǐ Wēi Yuán | Purple Forbidden enclosure | 紫微左垣 | Zǐwēizuǒyuán | Left Wall | β Cep | Alfirk (for component Aa) | 上衛增一 | Shǎngwèizēngyī | 1st additional star of The First Imperial Guard |
| Three Enclosures (三垣) | 紫微垣 | Zǐ Wēi Yuán | Purple Forbidden enclosure | 紫微左垣 | Zǐwēizuǒyuán | Left Wall | 11 Cep | | 上衛增二 | Shǎngwèizēngèr | 2nd additional star of The First Imperial Guard |
| Three Enclosures (三垣) | 紫微垣 | Zǐ Wēi Yuán | Purple Forbidden enclosure | 紫微左垣 | Zǐwēizuǒyuán | Left Wall | 78 Dra | | 上衛增三 | Shǎngwèizēngsān | 3rd additional star of The First Imperial Guard |
| Three Enclosures (三垣) | 紫微垣 | Zǐ Wēi Yuán | Purple Forbidden enclosure | 紫微左垣 | Zǐwēizuǒyuán | Left Wall | γ Cep | Errai (for component A) | | | |
| Three Enclosures (三垣) | 紫微垣 | Zǐ Wēi Yuán | Purple Forbidden enclosure | 紫微左垣 | Zǐwēizuǒyuán | Left Wall | γ Cep | Errai (for component A) | 紫微左垣七 | Zǐwēizuǒyuánqī | 7th star |
| Three Enclosures (三垣) | 紫微垣 | Zǐ Wēi Yuán | Purple Forbidden enclosure | 紫微左垣 | Zǐwēizuǒyuán | Left Wall | γ Cep | Errai (for component A) | 少衛 | Shǎowèi | The Second Imperial Guard |
| Three Enclosures (三垣) | 紫微垣 | Zǐ Wēi Yuán | Purple Forbidden enclosure | 紫微左垣 | Zǐwēizuǒyuán | Left Wall | 79 Dra | | 少衛增一 | Shǎowèizēngyī | 1st additional star of The Second Imperial Guard |
| Three Enclosures (三垣) | 紫微垣 | Zǐ Wēi Yuán | Purple Forbidden enclosure | 紫微左垣 | Zǐwēizuǒyuán | Left Wall | 16 Cep | | 少衛增二 | Shǎowèizēngèr | 2nd additional star of The Second Imperial Guard |
| Three Enclosures (三垣) | 紫微垣 | Zǐ Wēi Yuán | Purple Forbidden enclosure | 紫微左垣 | Zǐwēizuǒyuán | Left Wall | 24 Cep | | 少衛增三 | Shǎowèizēngsān | 3rd additional star of The Second Imperial Guard |
| Three Enclosures (三垣) | 紫微垣 | Zǐ Wēi Yuán | Purple Forbidden enclosure | 紫微左垣 | Zǐwēizuǒyuán | Left Wall | HD 210873 | | 少衛增四 | Shǎowèizēngsì | 4th additional star of The Second Imperial Guard |
| Three Enclosures (三垣) | 紫微垣 | Zǐ Wēi Yuán | Purple Forbidden enclosure | 紫微左垣 | Zǐwēizuǒyuán | Left Wall | 31 Cep | | 少衛增五 | Shǎowèizēngwǔ | 5th additional star of The Second Imperial Guard |
| Three Enclosures (三垣) | 紫微垣 | Zǐ Wēi Yuán | Purple Forbidden enclosure | 紫微左垣 | Zǐwēizuǒyuán | Left Wall | ρ^{2} Cep | | 少衛增七 | Shǎowèizēngqī | 7th additional star of The Second Imperial Guard |
| Three Enclosures (三垣) | 紫微垣 | Zǐ Wēi Yuán | Purple Forbidden enclosure | 天柱 | Tiānzhǔ | Celestial Pillars | | | | | |
| Three Enclosures (三垣) | 紫微垣 | Zǐ Wēi Yuán | Purple Forbidden enclosure | 天柱 | Tiānzhǔ | Celestial Pillars | 77 Dra | | 天柱二 | Tiānzhǔèr | 2nd star |
| Three Enclosures (三垣) | 紫微垣 | Zǐ Wēi Yuán | Purple Forbidden enclosure | 天柱 | Tiānzhǔ | Celestial Pillars | κ Cep | | 天增二 | Tiānzhǔzēngsān | 2nd additional star |
| Three Enclosures (三垣) | 紫微垣 | Zǐ Wēi Yuán | Purple Forbidden enclosure | 勾陳 | Gōuchén | Curved Array | | | | | |
| Three Enclosures (三垣) | 紫微垣 | Zǐ Wēi Yuán | Purple Forbidden enclosure | 勾陳 | Gōuchén | Curved Array | 2 UMi | Tarandus | 勾陳五 | Gōuchénwu | 5th star |
| Three Enclosures (三垣) | 紫微垣 | Zǐ Wēi Yuán | Purple Forbidden enclosure | 勾陳 | Gōuchén | Curved Array | HD 217382 | | 勾陳六 | Gōuchénliù | 6th star |
| Three Enclosures (三垣) | 紫微垣 | Zǐ Wēi Yuán | Purple Forbidden enclosure | 勾陳 | Gōuchén | Curved Array | HD 216446 | | 勾陳增一 | Gōuchénzēngyī | 1st additional star |
| Three Enclosures (三垣) | 紫微垣 | Zǐ Wēi Yuán | Purple Forbidden enclosure | 勾陳 | Gōuchén | Curved Array | HD 221525 | | 勾陳增二 | Gōuchénzēngèr | 2nd additional star |
| Three Enclosures (三垣) | 紫微垣 | Zǐ Wēi Yuán | Purple Forbidden enclosure | 勾陳 | Gōuchén | Curved Array | OV Cep | | 勾陳增四 | Gōuchénzēngsì | 4th additional star |
| Three Enclosures (三垣) | 紫微垣 | Zǐ Wēi Yuán | Purple Forbidden enclosure | 六甲 | Liùjiá | Six Jia | HD 30338 | | 六甲五 | Liùjiáwu | 5th star |
| Three Enclosures (三垣) | 紫微垣 | Zǐ Wēi Yuán | Purple Forbidden enclosure | 天皇大帝 | Tiānhuángdàdì | Great Emperor of Heaven | HD 212710 | | 天皇大帝 | Tiānhuángdàdì | (One star of) |
| Three Enclosures (三垣) | 紫微垣 | Zǐ Wēi Yuán | Purple Forbidden enclosure | 五帝內座 | Wǔdìnèizuò | Interior Seats of the Five Emperors | | | | | |
| Three Enclosures (三垣) | 紫微垣 | Zǐ Wēi Yuán | Purple Forbidden enclosure | 五帝內座 | Wǔdìnèizuò | Interior Seats of the Five Emperors | HD 18438 | | 五帝內座一 | Wudìnèizuòyī | 1st star |
| Three Enclosures (三垣) | 紫微垣 | Zǐ Wēi Yuán | Purple Forbidden enclosure | 五帝內座 | Wǔdìnèizuò | Interior Seats of the Five Emperors | HD 16458 | | | | |
| Three Enclosures (三垣) | 紫微垣 | Zǐ Wēi Yuán | Purple Forbidden enclosure | 五帝內座 | Wǔdìnèizuò | Interior Seats of the Five Emperors | HD 16458 | | 五帝內座三 | Wudìnèizuòsān | 3rd star |
| Three Enclosures (三垣) | 紫微垣 | Zǐ Wēi Yuán | Purple Forbidden enclosure | 五帝內座 | Wǔdìnèizuò | Interior Seats of the Five Emperors | HD 16458 | | 南方赤帝 | Nánfāngchìdì | Red king in the south |
| Three Enclosures (三垣) | 紫微垣 | Zǐ Wēi Yuán | Purple Forbidden enclosure | 五帝內座 | Wǔdìnèizuò | Interior Seats of the Five Emperors | HD 19978 | | 五帝內座四 | Wudìnèizuòsì | 4th star |
| Three Enclosures (三垣) | 紫微垣 | Zǐ Wēi Yuán | Purple Forbidden enclosure | 五帝內座 | Wǔdìnèizuò | Interior Seats of the Five Emperors | HD 25007 | | | | |
| Three Enclosures (三垣) | 紫微垣 | Zǐ Wēi Yuán | Purple Forbidden enclosure | 五帝內座 | Wǔdìnèizuò | Interior Seats of the Five Emperors | HD 25007 | | 五帝內座五 | Wudìnèizuòwu | 5th star |
| Three Enclosures (三垣) | 紫微垣 | Zǐ Wēi Yuán | Purple Forbidden enclosure | 五帝內座 | Wǔdìnèizuò | Interior Seats of the Five Emperors | HD 25007 | | 北方黑帝 | Běifānghēidì | Black king in the north |
| Three Enclosures (三垣) | 紫微垣 | Zǐ Wēi Yuán | Purple Forbidden enclosure | 五帝內座 | Wǔdìnèizuò | Interior Seats of the Five Emperors | HD 6798 | | 五帝內座增二 | Wudìnèizuòzēngèr | 2nd additional star |
| Three Enclosures (三垣) | 紫微垣 | Zǐ Wēi Yuán | Purple Forbidden enclosure | 五帝內座 | Wǔdìnèizuò | Interior Seats of the Five Emperors | HD 7238 | | 五帝內座增三 | Wudìnèizuòzēngsān | 3rd additional star |
| Three Enclosures (三垣) | 紫微垣 | Zǐ Wēi Yuán | Purple Forbidden enclosure | 傳舍 | Chuánshě | Guest House | HD 223274 | | 傳舍一 | Chuánshěyī | 1st star |
| Black Tortoise of the North (北方玄武) | 危 | Wēi | Rooftop | 天鈎 | Tiāngōu | Celestial Hook | | | | | |
| Black Tortoise of the North (北方玄武) | 危 | Wēi | Rooftop | 天鈎 | Tiāngōu | Celestial Hook | 4 Cep | | 天鈎一 | Tiāngōuyī | 1st star |
| Black Tortoise of the North (北方玄武) | 危 | Wēi | Rooftop | 天鈎 | Tiāngōu | Celestial Hook | θ Cep | | 天鈎三 | Tiāngōusān | 3rd star |
| Black Tortoise of the North (北方玄武) | 危 | Wēi | Rooftop | 天鈎 | Tiāngōu | Celestial Hook | η Cep | | 天鈎四 | Tiāngōusì | 4th star |
| Black Tortoise of the North (北方玄武) | 危 | Wēi | Rooftop | 天鈎 | Tiāngōu | Celestial Hook | α Cep | Alderamin | | | |
| Black Tortoise of the North (北方玄武) | 危 | Wēi | Rooftop | 天鈎 | Tiāngōu | Celestial Hook | α Cep | Alderamin | 天鈎五 | Tiāngōuwu | 5th star |
| Black Tortoise of the North (北方玄武) | 危 | Wēi | Rooftop | 天鈎 | Tiāngōu | Celestial Hook | α Cep | Alderamin | 天鉤东第六星 | Tiāngōudōngdìliùxīng | 6th eastern star |
| Black Tortoise of the North (北方玄武) | 危 | Wēi | Rooftop | 天鈎 | Tiāngōu | Celestial Hook | α Cep | Alderamin | 内五诸侯 | Nàwuzhūhóu | Five internal feudal vassal |
| Black Tortoise of the North (北方玄武) | 危 | Wēi | Rooftop | 天鈎 | Tiāngōu | Celestial Hook | ξ Cep | Kurhah (for component Aa) | 天鈎六 | Tiāngōuliù | 6th star |
| Black Tortoise of the North (北方玄武) | 危 | Wēi | Rooftop | 天鈎 | Tiāngōu | Celestial Hook | 26 Cep | | 天鈎七 | Tiāngōuqī | 7th star |
| Black Tortoise of the North (北方玄武) | 危 | Wēi | Rooftop | 天鈎 | Tiāngōu | Celestial Hook | ι Cep | | 天鈎八 | Tiāngōubā | 8th star |
| Black Tortoise of the North (北方玄武) | 危 | Wēi | Rooftop | 天鈎 | Tiāngōu | Celestial Hook | ο Cep | | 天鈎九 | Tiāngōujiǔ | 9th star |
| Black Tortoise of the North (北方玄武) | 危 | Wēi | Rooftop | 天鈎 | Tiāngōu | Celestial Hook | 66 Cep | | 天钩增一 | Tiāngōuzēngyī | 1st additional star |
| Black Tortoise of the North (北方玄武) | 危 | Wēi | Rooftop | 天鈎 | Tiāngōu | Celestial Hook | 68 Cep | | 天鈎增二 | Tiāngōuzēngèr | 2nd additional star |
| Black Tortoise of the North (北方玄武) | 危 | Wēi | Rooftop | 天鈎 | Tiāngōu | Celestial Hook | 71 Cep | | 天鈎增三 | Tiāngōuzēngsān | 3rd additional star |
| Black Tortoise of the North (北方玄武) | 危 | Wēi | Rooftop | 天鈎 | Tiāngōu | Celestial Hook | 6 Cep | | 天鈎增五 | Tiāngōuzēngwǔ | 5th additional star |
| Black Tortoise of the North (北方玄武) | 危 | Wēi | Rooftop | 天鈎 | Tiāngōu | Celestial Hook | 7 Cep | | 天钩增七 | Tiāngōuzēngqī | 7th additional star |
| Black Tortoise of the North (北方玄武) | 危 | Wēi | Rooftop | 天鈎 | Tiāngōu | Celestial Hook | 9 Cep | | 天鈎增九 | Tiāngōuzēngèr | 9th additional star |
| Black Tortoise of the North (北方玄武) | 危 | Wēi | Rooftop | 天鈎 | Tiāngōu | Celestial Hook | 19 Cep | | 天鈎增十一 | Tiāngōuzēngshíyī | 11th additional star |
| Black Tortoise of the North (北方玄武) | 危 | Wēi | Rooftop | 天鈎 | Tiāngōu | Celestial Hook | 20 Cep | | 天鈎增十三 | Tiāngōuzēngshísān | 13th additional star |
| Black Tortoise of the North (北方玄武) | 危 | Wēi | Rooftop | 天鈎 | Tiāngōu | Celestial Hook | 25 Cep | | 天鈎增十四 | Tiāngōuzēngshísì | 14th additional star |
| Black Tortoise of the North (北方玄武) | 危 | Wēi | Rooftop | 天鈎 | Tiāngōu | Celestial Hook | 30 Cep | | 天鈎增十五 | Tiāngōuzēngshíwǔ | 15th additional star |
| Black Tortoise of the North (北方玄武) | 危 | Wēi | Rooftop | 造父 | Zàofǔ | Tsao Fu | | | | | |
| Black Tortoise of the North (北方玄武) | 危 | Wēi | Rooftop | 造父 | Zàofǔ | Tsao Fu | δ Cep | | 造父一 | Zàofǔyī | 1st star |
| Black Tortoise of the North (北方玄武) | 危 | Wēi | Rooftop | 造父 | Zàofǔ | Tsao Fu | ζ Cep | | 造父二 | Zàofǔèr | 2nd star |
| Black Tortoise of the North (北方玄武) | 危 | Wēi | Rooftop | 造父 | Zàofǔ | Tsao Fu | λ Cep | | 造父三 | Zàofǔsān | 3rd star |
| Black Tortoise of the North (北方玄武) | 危 | Wēi | Rooftop | 造父 | Zàofǔ | Tsao Fu | μ Cep | Garnet Star | 造父四 | Zàofǔsì | 4th star |
| Black Tortoise of the North (北方玄武) | 危 | Wēi | Rooftop | 造父 | Zàofǔ | Tsao Fu | ν Cep | | 造父五 | Zàofǔwu | 5th star |
| Black Tortoise of the North (北方玄武) | 危 | Wēi | Rooftop | 造父 | Zàofǔ | Tsao Fu | 14 Cep | | 造父增一 | Zàofǔzēngyī | 1st additional star |
| Black Tortoise of the North (北方玄武) | 危 | Wēi | Rooftop | 造父 | Zàofǔ | Tsao Fu | HD 210220 | | 造父增二 | Zàofǔzēngèr | 2nd additional star |
| Black Tortoise of the North (北方玄武) | 危 | Wēi | Rooftop | 造父 | Zàofǔ | Tsao Fu | 15 Cep | | 造父增三 | Zàofǔzēngsān | 3rd additional star |
| Black Tortoise of the North (北方玄武) | 危 | Wēi | Rooftop | 造父 | Zàofǔ | Tsao Fu | 12 Cep | | 造父增四 | Zàofǔzēngsì | 4th additional star |
| Black Tortoise of the North (北方玄武) | 室 | Shì | Encampment | 騰蛇 | Téngshé | Flying Serpent | | | | | |
| Black Tortoise of the North (北方玄武) | 室 | Shì | Encampment | 騰蛇 | Téngshé | Flying Serpent | HD 206267 | | 螣蛇七 | Téngshéqī | 7th star |
| Black Tortoise of the North (北方玄武) | 室 | Shì | Encampment | 騰蛇 | Téngshé | Flying Serpent | 13 Cep | | 螣蛇八 | Téngshébā | 8th star |
| Black Tortoise of the North (北方玄武) | 室 | Shì | Encampment | 騰蛇 | Téngshé | Flying Serpent | ε Cep | | 螣蛇九 | Téngshéjiǔ | 9th star |

== See also ==
- Traditional Chinese star names
- Chinese constellations
