= NGC 7160 =

Open cluster in the constellation Cepheus

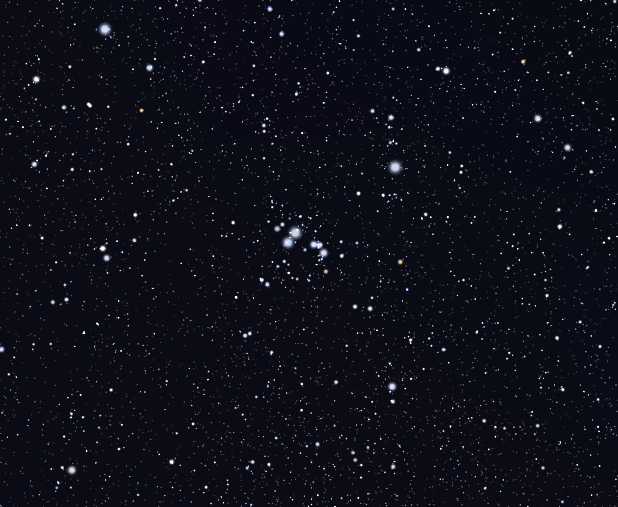
- Simulated image of NGC 7160

Observation data (J2000 epoch)
- Right ascension: 21^{h} 53^{m} 40^{s}
- Declination: +62° 36′ 12″
- Distance: 2,570 ly (789 pc)
- Apparent magnitude (V): 6.1
- Apparent dimensions (V): 13'

Physical characteristics
- Mass: 105 M_{☉}
- Estimated age: 15 million years
- Part of Cepheus OB2
- Other designations: Cr 443, OCl 236

Associations
- Constellation: Cepheus

NGC 7160, also known as the Bruce Lee Cluster, is an open cluster in the constellation Cepheus. It was discovered by William Herschel on November 9, 1789. The cluster was also observed by John Herschel on October 7, 1829. It is a poor cluster and with little central concentration, with Trumpler class II3p. It is part of the stellar association Cepheus OB2, located one degree south-southwest of VV Cephei.

== Description ==
NGC 7160 is a young cluster, whose age is estimated to be between 10 and 19 million years. The cluster presents no extended infrared emission when observed by Spitzer Space Telescope and Herschel Space Telescope which suggests that the molecular cloud in which it was formed has been removed. NGC 7160 lies within the Cepheus Bubble, an expanding dusty shell with a diameter of about 10 degrees, which corresponds to 120 pc (390 ly) at the distance of NGC 7160. It is bordered by HII regions like IC 1396, in which is located the open cluster Trumpler 37. The total mass of molecular gas in the Cepheus Bubble is estimated to be 10^{5} M_{☉} based on CO emission mapping. The bubble is believed to have been formed by the stellar wind and photoionisation from OB stars that have exploded as supernovae. Mu Cephei, Nu Cephei, and NGC 7160 may have been companions of those stars. It has been suggested that Lambda Cephei and 68 Cygni are runaway stars from that area.

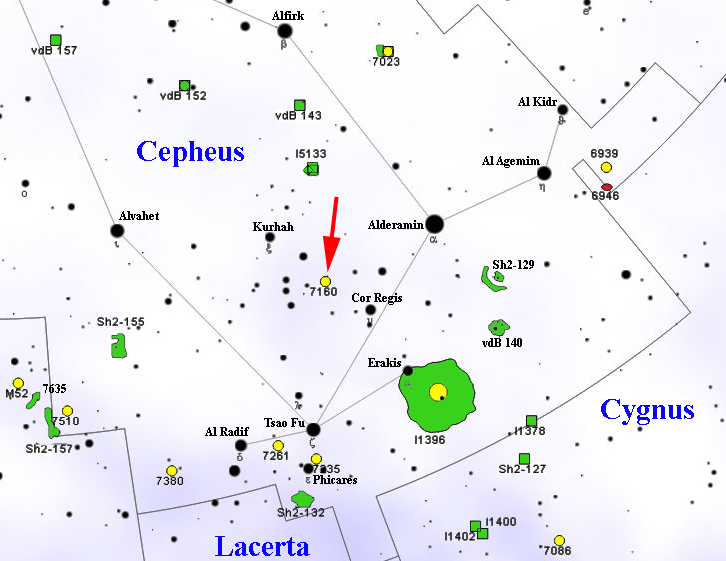
The location of NGC 7160 in the sky

The core radius of the cluster is 0.73 parsec (2.4 light years), while the tidal radius is 5.7 parsecs (18.5 light years) and represents the average outer limit of NGC 7160, beyond which a star is unlikely to remain gravitationally bound to the cluster core. 16 stars, probable members of the cluster, are located within the central part of the cluster, and 71 probable members are located within the angular radius of the cluster. Among the members is EM Cephei (mag 7.03), a variable star whose spectrum switches between B and Be star states. It is suggested it is a Be star with a variable circumstellar disk with mass losses (6±3)×10^{−11} M_{☉} per year. One low mass member, with spectral type K4.5 is accreting, suggesting the presence of a protoplanetary disk. It is characterised by very low far-IR flux with a high accretion rate.

== See also ==
- List of open clusters
