= V419 Cephei =

Star in the constellation Cepheus

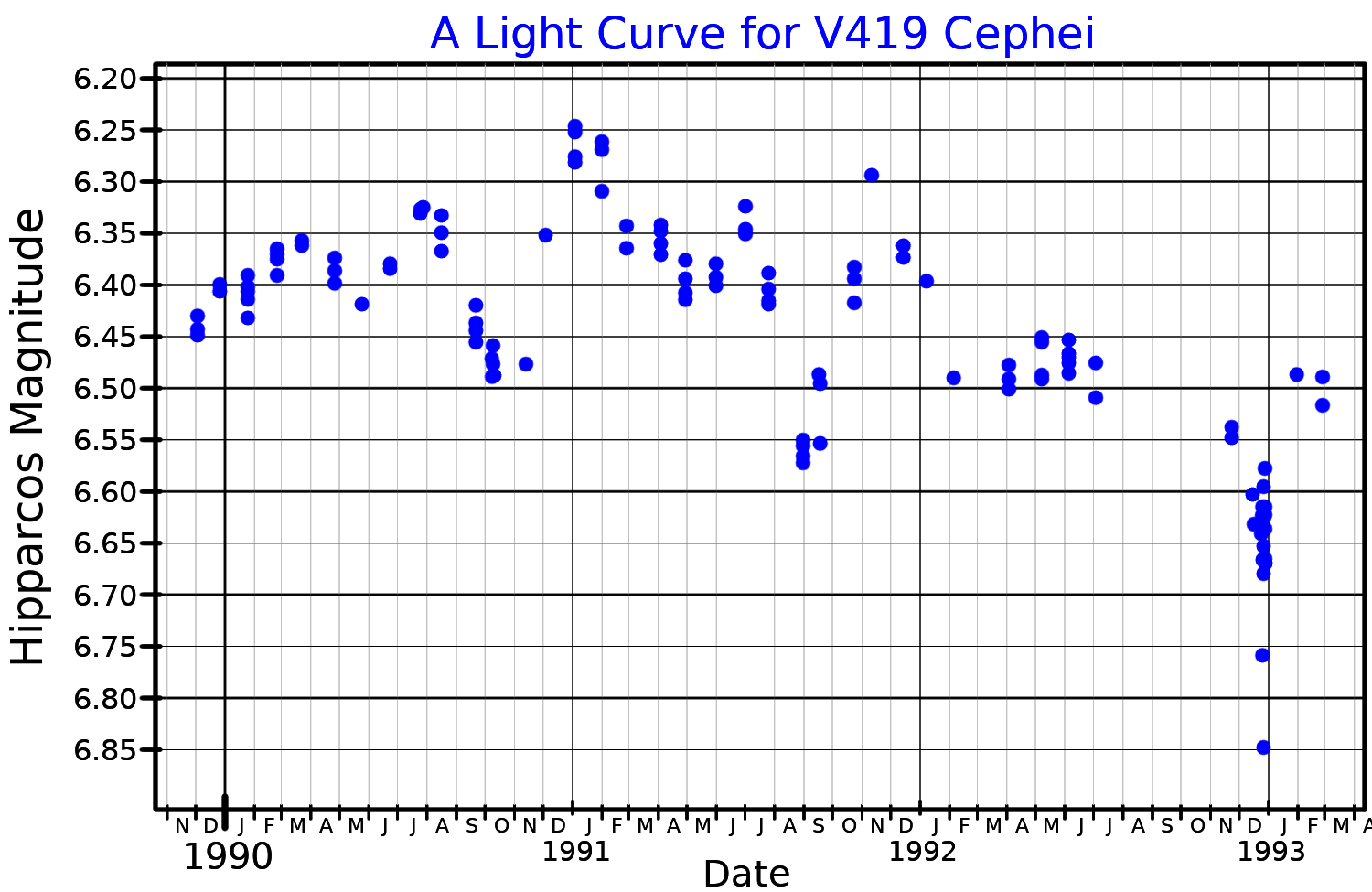
- A light curve for V419 Cephei, plotted from Hipparcos data

Observation data Epoch J2000 Equinox ICRS
- Constellation: Cepheus
- Right ascension: 21^{h} 12^{m} 47.24741^{s}
- Declination: +60° 05′ 52.8017″
- Apparent magnitude (V): 6.54 - 6.89

Characteristics
- Evolutionary stage: Red supergiant
- Spectral type: M2 Ib
- Variable type: Lc

Astrometry
Proper motion (μ)	RA: −2.515 mas/yr Dec.: −3.277 mas/yr
Parallax (π)	1.0342±0.1022 mas
Distance	1,085 pc
Absolute magnitude (M_{V})	−5.72

Details
Mass	4.8 M_{☉}
Radius	586 R_{☉}
Luminosity (bolometric)	58,300 L_{☉}
Temperature	3,660 K
Age	10.0 Myr

Other designations
- V419 Cep, HD 202380, HIP 104719, SAO 33232, BD+59°2342, AG+59 1417, GCRV 13343

Database references
SIMBAD	data

V419 Cephei (BD+59°2342 or HIP 104719) is an irregular variable star in the constellation of Cepheus with an apparent magnitude that varies between 6.54 and 6.89.

== Distance ==
The Hipparcos-measured parallax of 0.63±0.29 mas is not well-constrained to evaluate its distance. Based on kinematic analysis, its most likely distance is 1,085±320 parsecs, equal to 3,540±1,035 light years. The Gaia Data Release 2 parallax of 1.0342±0.1022 mas is consistent with this distance. It is a member of the stellar association Cepheus OB2-A.

== Characteristics ==
V419 Cephei is a red supergiant of spectral type M2 Ib with an effective temperature around 3,700 K and an estimated radius of 533 R_{☉}. The K-band angular diameter measurements equal 5.90 ± 0.70 milliarcseconds, which leads to a figure not much higher, although the uncertainty in its distance must also be taken into account. If placed at the Sun's location, it would engulf the orbits of Mercury, Venus, Earth, Mars, and roughly half of the asteroid belt.

Published values for the mass of V419 Cephei vary from around 5 M_{☉} to over 16 M_{☉}, above the limit beyond which stars end their lives as supernovae. The life of such massive stars is very short. Despite its advanced evolutionary state, V419 Cephei is only 10 million years old.

The variability of the brightness of the star was discovered when the Hipparcos data was analyzed. It was given its variable star designation, V419 Cephei, in 1999. Billed as an irregular variable star of type LC, V419 Cephei's brightness varies between magnitudes 6.54 and 6.89 with no apparent periodicity.
