= Pi Cephei =

Star in the constellation Cepheus

π Cephei
- Location of π Cephei (circled in red)

Observation data Epoch J2000 Equinox ICRS
- Constellation: Cepheus
- Right ascension: 23^{h} 07^{m} 53.854^{s}
- Declination: +75° 23′ 15.00″
- Apparent magnitude (V): 4.419 (4.61 + 6.75)

Characteristics
- Spectral type: G7III + F5V + A7V-A9V
- U−B color index: −0.46
- B−V color index: +0.8

Astrometry
Radial velocity (R_{v})	−27.33±0.01 km/s
Proper motion (μ)	RA: +6.81±1.05 mas/yr Dec.: −34.06±0.88 mas/yr
Parallax (π)	13.8±0.41 mas
Distance	236 ± 7 ly (72 ± 2 pc)
Absolute magnitude (M_{V})	0.24

Orbit
Primary	π Cep Aa
Name	π Cep Ab
Period (P)	556.72±0.05 d
Semi-major axis (a)	39.0±3.9 mas
Eccentricity (e)	0.297±0.006
Inclination (i)	99.0±2.5°
Longitude of the node (Ω)	109.2±3.5°
Periastron epoch (T)	2,439,172.9±1.6
Argument of periastron (ω) (secondary)	7.6±1.2°
Semi-amplitude (K_{1}) (primary)	24.18±0.15 km/s

Orbit
Primary	π Cephei A (Aa + Ab)
Name	π Cephei B
Period (P)	162.8±2.8 yr
Semi-major axis (a)	0.810±0.050″
Eccentricity (e)	0.5968±0.0067
Inclination (i)	30.0±3.0°
Longitude of the node (Ω)	90.3±4.9°
Periastron epoch (T)	B 1934.573±0.35
Argument of periastron (ω) (secondary)	90.0±4.4°

Details

π Cep Aa
Mass	3.63±0.53 M_{☉}
Surface gravity (log g)	3.05±0.11 cgs
Temperature	5,226±92 K
Metallicity [Fe/H]	0.29±0.05 dex
Age	100 Myr

π Cep Ab
Mass	3.27±0.48 M_{☉}

π Cep B
Mass	1.93±0.23 M_{☉}

Other designations
- π Cep, 33 Cephei, BD+74°1006, GC 32237, HD 218658, HIP 114222, HR 8819, SAO 10629, WDS J23079+7523AB

Database references
SIMBAD	data
- Pi Cep A
- Pi Cep B

Pi Cephei is a trinary star system located in the northern constellation Cepheus. Its name is a Bayer designation that is Latinized from π Cephei, and abbreviated Pi Cep or π Cep. With a combined apparent magnitude of about 4.4, the system is faintly visible to the naked eye. It is located at a distance of approximately 236 light-years (72 pc) from the Earth.

Pi Cephei was found to have a visual companion star by Otto Wilhelm von Struve in 1843. The brighter member is itself a spectroscopic binary, which was first noticed by William Wallace Campbell in 1901 using photographic plates taken at Lick Observatory. The inner pair of stars orbit with a period of 1.5 years while the outer companion completes an orbit in about 160 years.

The primary component has a stellar classification of G7III, presenting as an aging G-type giant star. At the age of 100 million years, it has an estimated 3–4 times the mass of the Sun. The lower mass components have classes of F5V and A7V-A9V, thus appearing to be main sequence stars.
