= Rho1 Cephei =

Star in the constellation Cepheus

Rho^{1} Cephei
- Location of ρ^{1} Cephei (circled in red)

Observation data Epoch J2000.0 Equinox J2000.0 (ICRS)
- Constellation: Cepheus
- Right ascension: 22^{h} 26^{m} 42.434^{s}
- Declination: +78° 47′ 09.144″
- Apparent magnitude (V): 5.84

Characteristics
- Spectral type: A2m
- B−V color index: −0.16

Astrometry
Proper motion (μ)	RA: −18.440 mas/yr Dec.: −48.707 mas/yr
Parallax (π)	16.2606±0.0414 mas
Distance	200.6 ± 0.5 ly (61.5 ± 0.2 pc)

Details

ρ^{1} Cep A
Mass	2.00 M_{☉} 1.82±0.04 M_{☉}
Radius	1.870±0.038 R_{☉}
Luminosity	13.89±0.08 L_{☉}
Surface gravity (log g)	3.8997^{+0.003}_{−0.005} cgs
Temperature	7,600^{+9}_{−7} K
Rotational velocity (v sin i)	81 km/s
Age	320 Myr; 683±165 Myr

ρ^{1} Cep B
Mass	0.51 M_{☉}

Other designations
- ρ^{1} Cep, 28 Cep, BD+78°796, HD 213403, HIP 110787, HR 8578, SAO 10375, WDS J22267+7847AB

Database references
SIMBAD	data

Rho^{1} Cephei is a double star located in the northern constellation of Cepheus. Its name is a Bayer designation that is Latinized from ρ^{1} Cephei, and abbreviated Rho^{1} Cep or ρ^{1} Cep. As of 2014, the pair had an angular separation of 0.29 arc seconds along a position angle of 211.1°. This corresponds to a projected separation of 18.1 AU. Rho^{1} Cephei is faintly visible to the naked eye with an apparent visual magnitude of 5.84, and it forms an optical pair with the brighter star Rho^{2} Cephei. Based upon an annual parallax shift of 16.26 mas as seen from the Earth, Rho^{1} Cephei is located approximately 201 light-years (62 pc) from the Sun.

The primary component is a chemically peculiar Am star with a stellar classification of A2m. It has twice the mass of the Sun and is around 320 million years old. The smaller companion may be the source of the X-ray emission from this location, as stars similar to the primary component do not generally produce detectable levels of X-rays.
