= HD 12467 =

Star in the constellation Cepheus

Observation data Epoch J2000.0 Equinox J2000.0
- Constellation: Cepheus
- Right ascension: 02^{h} 09^{m} 25.30945^{s}
- Declination: +81° 17′ 45.3977″
- Apparent magnitude (V): 6.05

Characteristics
- Evolutionary stage: main sequence
- Spectral type: A1.5V
- U−B color index: 0.06
- B−V color index: 0.11

Astrometry
Radial velocity (R_{v})	−9.0±3.0 km/s
Proper motion (μ)	RA: −34.818 mas/yr Dec.: +6.596 mas/yr
Parallax (π)	14.2384±0.0245 mas
Distance	229.1 ± 0.4 ly (70.2 ± 0.1 pc)
Absolute magnitude (M_{V})	+1.81

Details
Mass	1.81 M_{☉}
Radius	1.92 R_{☉}
Luminosity	16 L_{☉}
Surface gravity (log g)	4.30 cgs
Temperature	8,528 K
Rotational velocity (v sin i)	130 km/s
Age	254 Myr

Other designations
- BD+80°6, FK5 3943, GC 2517, HD 12467, HIP 10054, HR 597, SAO 344

Database references
SIMBAD	data

HD 12467 is a single star in the northern circumpolar constellation of Cepheus. It has a white hue and is barely visible to the naked eye with an apparent visual magnitude of 6.05. The distance to this object is 229 light years based on parallax, but it is drifting closer with a heliocentric radial velocity of −9 km/s.

This object is an ordinary A-type main-sequence star with a stellar classification of A1.5V, which indicates it is generating energy through core hydrogen fusion. It is 254 million years old with a relatively high projected rotational velocity of 130 km/s. The star has 1.8 times the mass of the Sun and 1.9 times the Sun's radius. It is radiating 16 times the luminosity of the Sun from its photosphere at an effective temperature of 8,528 K.

The star displays an infrared excess with a signature that suggests it has two debris disks. The inner disk is orbiting 7.4 AU from the host star with a mean temperature of 200 K, while the outer disk is 50 K at a separation of 119 AU.
