= HD 217382 =

Star in the constellation Cepheus

- Location of HD 217382 (circled in red)

Observation data Epoch J2000 Equinox ICRS
- Constellation: Cepheus
- Right ascension: 22^{h} 47^{m} 24.97075^{s}
- Declination: +84° 20′ 46.2312″
- Apparent magnitude (V): 4.70

Characteristics
- Spectral type: K4 III
- B−V color index: 1.418±0.001

Astrometry
Radial velocity (R_{v})	+2.57±0.13 km/s
Proper motion (μ)	RA: +98.346 mas/yr Dec.: +24.049 mas/yr
Parallax (π)	8.7418±0.0818 mas
Distance	373 ± 3 ly (114 ± 1 pc)
Absolute magnitude (M_{V})	−0.49

Details
Mass	1.24 M_{☉}
Radius	31 R_{☉}
Luminosity	286 L_{☉}
Surface gravity (log g)	1.31 cgs
Temperature	4,236 K
Metallicity [Fe/H]	−0.09 dex
Rotational velocity (v sin i)	1.0 km/s
Age	2.9 Gyr

Other designations
- BD+83°640, FK5 1649, HD 217382, HIP 113116, HR 8748, SAO 3816, ADS 16294, WDS J22475+8309AB

Database references
SIMBAD	data

HD 217382 is a suspected binary star system in the northern circumpolar constellation of Cepheus. It is faintly visible to the naked eye with an apparent visual magnitude of 4.70. The distance to HD 217382 is around 373 light years, as determined from an annual parallax shift of 8.74 mas. The system is moving further away with a heliocentric radial velocity of +2.6 km/s. It is a candidate member of the Hyades supercluster and has a peculiar velocity of 9.2 km/s.

The visible component of this system is an evolved K-type giant star with a stellar classification of K4 III. It is a periodic variable with a frequency of a cycle every 10.64724 days and an amplitude of 0.0041 in magnitude. The star has an estimated 31 times the radius of the Sun and is radiating 286 times the Sun's luminosity from its enlarged photosphere at an effective temperature of about 4,236 K.
