= 7 Cephei =

Star in the constellation Cepheus

Observation data Epoch J2000 Equinox ICRS
- Constellation: Cepheus
- Right ascension: 21^{h} 27^{m} 46.14144^{s}
- Declination: +66° 48′ 32.7406″
- Apparent magnitude (V): 5.42

Characteristics
- Evolutionary stage: main sequence
- Spectral type: B7 V
- B−V color index: −0.099±0.004

Astrometry
Radial velocity (R_{v})	+3.0±4.2 km/s
Proper motion (μ)	RA: −11.296 mas/yr Dec.: −19.787 mas/yr
Parallax (π)	3.9653±0.1148 mas
Distance	820 ± 20 ly (252 ± 7 pc)
Absolute magnitude (M_{V})	−1.54

Details
Mass	4.47±0.07 M_{☉}
Radius	3.0 R_{☉}
Luminosity	769+94 −84 L_{☉}
Surface gravity (log g)	3.56 cgs
Temperature	12,560+87 −86 K
Metallicity [Fe/H]	−0.36 dex
Rotational velocity (v sin i)	236 km/s
Age	38 Myr

Other designations
- 7 Cep, BD+66°1405, FK5 3718, HD 204770, HIP 105972, HR 8227, SAO 19432

Database references
SIMBAD	data

7 Cephei is a single star located approximately 820 light years away, in the northern circumpolar constellation of Cepheus. It is visible to the naked eye as a dim, blue-white hued star with an apparent visual magnitude of 5.42.

This is a B-type main-sequence star with a stellar classification of B7 V. It is a candidate variable star with an amplitude of 9 micromagnitudes and a period of 0.737±0.002 d. This object has 4.5 times the mass of the Sun and about three times the Sun's radius. It is spinning rapidly with a projected rotational velocity of 236 km/s. 7 Cephei is radiating 769 times the luminosity of the Sun from its photosphere at an effective temperature of 12,560 K.
