= HD 221525 =

Star in the constellation Cepheus

- Location of HD 221525 (circled in red)

Observation data Epoch J2000.0 Equinox ICRS
- Constellation: Cepheus
- Right ascension: 23^{h} 27^{m} 00.91338^{s}
- Declination: +87° 18′ 27.0304″
- Apparent magnitude (V): 5.56

Characteristics
- Spectral type: A8III or A7IV
- B−V color index: 0.250±0.004

Astrometry
Radial velocity (R_{v})	−10.9±2.9 km/s
Proper motion (μ)	RA: +75.736 mas/yr Dec.: +16.724 mas/yr
Parallax (π)	10.3023±0.0957 mas
Distance	317 ± 3 ly (97.1 ± 0.9 pc)
Absolute magnitude (M_{V})	0.52

Details
Mass	2.25? M_{☉}
Radius	3.98+0.11 −0.13 R_{☉}
Luminosity	44.3±0.5 L_{☉}
Temperature	7466+217 −105 K
Rotational velocity (v sin i)	110 km/s
Age	~900 Myr

Other designations
- BD+86°3444, HD 221525, HIP 115746, HR 8938, SAO 3916

Database references
SIMBAD	data

HD 221525 is a single star near the north celestial pole in the constellation Cepheus. At an apparent magnitude of 5.56, it can be seen with the naked eye under dark skies. It is about 30 times fainter than the nearby prominent star Polaris. Based upon parallax measurements, HD 221525 is located at a distance of approximately 317 light years from the Sun, but is drifting closer with a radial velocity of −11 km/s.

This object is an A-type star with a stellar classification of A7IV or A8III, suggesting it is an evolving star on the subgiant or giant branch, respectively. It has a relatively high rate of spin, showing a projected rotational velocity of 110 km/s. The star has four times the radius of the Sun and is radiating 44 times the Sun's luminosity from its photosphere at an effective temperature of 7,466 K.
