= Cepheus A =

Star-forming region in Cepheus

Nebula
- Star-forming region
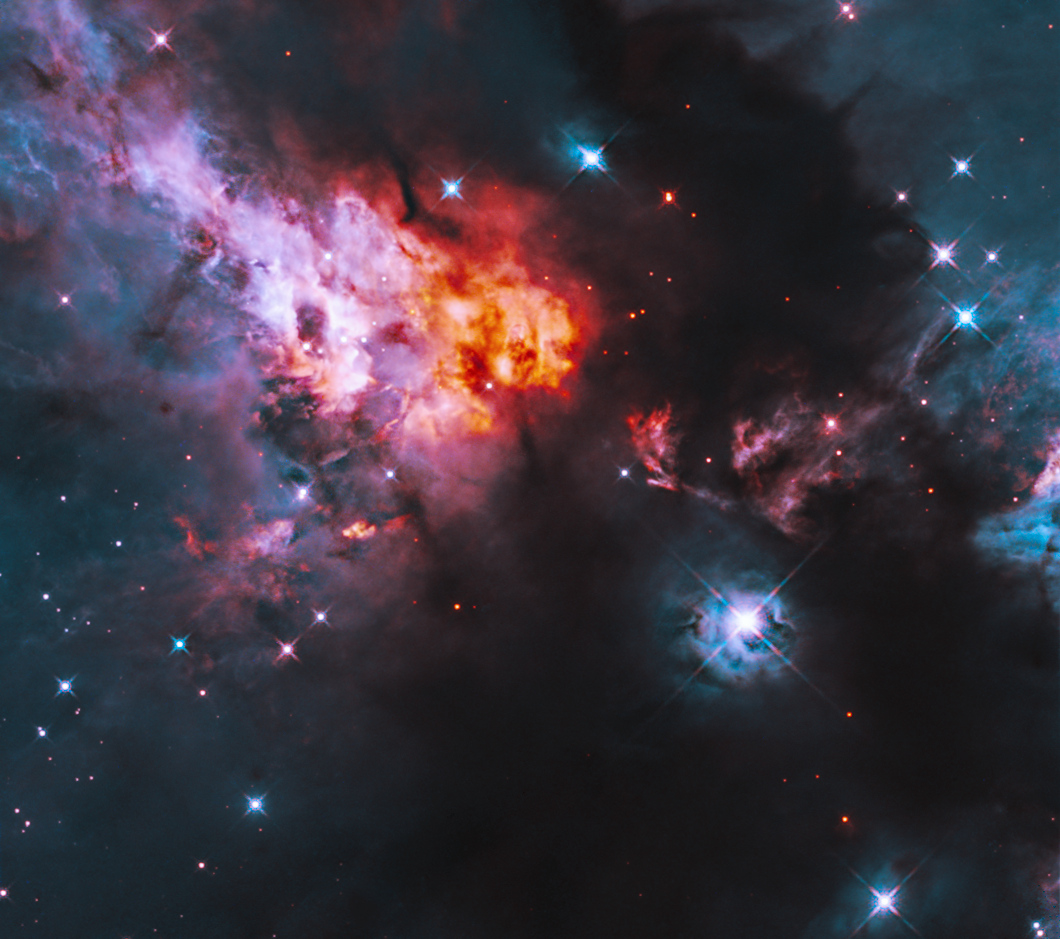
- Hubble Space Telescope image of Cepheus A

Observation data: J2000.0 epoch
- Right ascension: 22^{h} 56^{m} 17.90^{s}
- Declination: +62° 01′ 49.0″
- Distance: 2,300 ly
- Constellation: Cepheus
- Designations: Cepheus A

Cepheus A (also known as Cep A) is a star-forming region located in the constellation of Cepheus. It is one of the nearest sites of massive star formation, situated approximately 2,300 light-years (700 parsecs) from the Solar System. Cepheus A is notable for its dense molecular clouds and ionized gas, where massive protostars are actively accreting material, providing a key laboratory for studying the early stages of stellar evolution in high-mass stars.

== Observation and Charecterstics ==
Cepheus A consists of a complex of H II regions, including Cep A East and Cep A West, embedded within molecular clouds rich in molecules such as carbon monoxide (CO) and carbon sulfide (CS). The region is characterized by turbulent gas dynamics, magnetic fields, and outflows driven by young stars. At its core lies HW2, a massive protostar that has reached about 16 solar masses (M⊙) and continues to grow at one of the fastest observed rates for such objects.

In the 2010s, high-resolution imaging confirmed the presence of an accretion disk around HW2, resolving debates about whether massive stars form via disk-mediated accretion similar to low-mass stars. Recent advancements, particularly in 2025, have quantified the rapid growth of HW2 through detailed kinematic mapping.

Magnetic fields in the region, measured via H2O maser polarization, range from 100 to 600 milligauss (mG), playing a crucial role in regulating collapse and angular momentum transport.

== Star formation ==
Cepheus A is a prolific site for forming stars of tens of solar masses, which will eventually evolve into supernovae progenitors. The protostar HW2, central to the region, accretes at a rate of approximately 2 × 10−3 M⊙ yr−1—equivalent to about 2 Jupiter masses per year—sustained by efficient disk feeding despite intense stellar radiation.
