= 16 Cephei =

Star in the constellation Cepheus

Observation data Epoch J2000 Equinox ICRS
- Constellation: Cepheus
- Right ascension: 21^{h} 59^{m} 14.96721^{s}
- Declination: +73° 10′ 47.6222″
- Apparent magnitude (V): 5.036

Characteristics
- Evolutionary stage: main sequence
- Spectral type: F5V
- B−V color index: 0.41

Astrometry
| Radial velocity (R_{v}) | −20.17±0.13 km/s |
| Proper motion (μ) | RA: −67.994 mas/yr Dec.: −160.076 mas/yr |
| Parallax (π) | 27.2259±0.0708 mas |
| Distance | 119.8 ± 0.3 ly (36.73 ± 0.10 pc) |
| Absolute magnitude (M_{V}) | 2.17 |

Details
| Mass | 1.563±0.061 M_{☉} |
| Radius | 2.452±0.067 R_{☉} |
| Luminosity | 11.264±0.085 L_{☉} |
| Surface gravity (log g) | 3.84±0.05 cgs |
| Temperature | 6,754±93 K |
| Metallicity [Fe/H] | −0.24±0.10 dex |
| Rotational velocity (v sin i) | 26.4 km/s |
| Age | 2 Gyr |

Other designations
- 16 Cep, BD+72°1009, GC 30800, HD 209369, HIP 108535, HR 8400, SAO 10216

Database references
| SIMBAD | data |

16 Cephei is a single star located about 119 light years away from the Sun in the constellation of Cepheus. It is visible to the naked eye as a faint, yellow-white hued star with an apparent visual magnitude of 5.036. The star has a relatively high proper motion, traversing the celestial sphere at the rate of 0.174 arc seconds per annum. It is moving closer to the Earth with a heliocentric radial velocity of −20 km/s.

This is an ordinary F-type main-sequence star, somewhat hotter than the sun, with a stellar classification of F5 V. It is around two billion years old with a projected rotational velocity of 26.4 km/s. The star has an estimated 1.563 times the mass of the Sun and 2.452 times the Sun's radius. It is radiating 11 times the luminosity of the Sun from its photosphere at an effective temperature of 6,754 K. The star is a source of X-ray emission.

There are several 11th and 12th magnitude stars within a few arc-minutes of 16 Cephei, all of them distant background objects. Only one of these is listed in the Washington Double Star Catalog and Catalog of Components of Double and Multiple Stars as a companion.
