= Kappa Cephei =

Star in the constellation Cepheus

- Location of κ Cephei (circled in red)

Observation data Epoch J2000 Equinox ICRS
- Constellation: Cepheus
- Right ascension: 20^{h} 08^{m} 53.34492^{s}
- Declination: +77° 42′ 41.0909″
- Apparent magnitude (V): 4.39

Characteristics
- Spectral type: B9III + A7V
- U−B color index: −0.11
- B−V color index: −0.05

Astrometry
| Absolute magnitude (M_{V}) | −0.54 |

Kap Cep A
| Radial velocity (R_{v}) | −22.8±0.9 km/s |
| Proper motion (μ) | RA: +12.044 mas/yr Dec.: +26.199 mas/yr |
| Parallax (π) | 10.0861±0.2468 mas |
| Distance | 323 ± 8 ly (99 ± 2 pc) |

Kap Cep B
| Radial velocity (R_{v}) | −15.3±5 km/s |
| Proper motion (μ) | RA: +10.725±0.047 mas/yr Dec.: +25.543±0.056 mas/yr |
| Parallax (π) | 9.9981±0.0290 mas |
| Distance | 326.2 ± 0.9 ly (100.0 ± 0.3 pc) |

Details

Kap Cep A
| Mass | 3.02±0.5 M_{☉} |
| Radius | 4.45±0.22 R_{☉} |
| Luminosity | 191 L_{☉} |
| Surface gravity (log g) | 3.66±0.03 cgs |
| Temperature | 10,174±55 K |
| Metallicity [Fe/H] | −0.05 dex |
| Age | 302+77 −72 Myr |

Kap Cep B
| Radius | 1.32 R_{☉} |
| Luminosity | 4.05 L_{☉} |
| Temperature | 7,119 K |

Other designations
- κ Cep, 1 Cephei, BD+77°764, HD 192907, HIP 99255, HR 7750, SAO 9665, GSC 04589-03106

Database references
| SIMBAD | data |
- B
- C

Kappa Cephei is a binary star system in the northern circumpolar constellation of Cepheus. Its name is a Bayer designation that is Latinized from κ Cephei, and abbreviated Kappa Cep or κ Cep. It is visible to the naked eye as a faint, blue white-hued point of light with an apparent visual magnitude is 4.39. The system is located approximately 323 light-years (99 pc) distant from the Earth, based on parallax measurements. It is drifting closer to the Sun with a line of sight velocity component of −23 km/s.

The two gravitationally-bound members of this system had an angular separation of 7.3″ along a position angle of 120°, as of 2015. The primary, designated component A, has a stellar classification of B9III, presenting as a blue giant. The magnitude 8.34 secondary, component B, is an A-type main-sequence star of class A7V. A third star of 10th magnitude, BD+77 763, is listed as component C in the Washington Double Star Catalog although it is a background object unrelated to the other two.
