= LZ Cephei =

Variable star in the constellation Cepheus

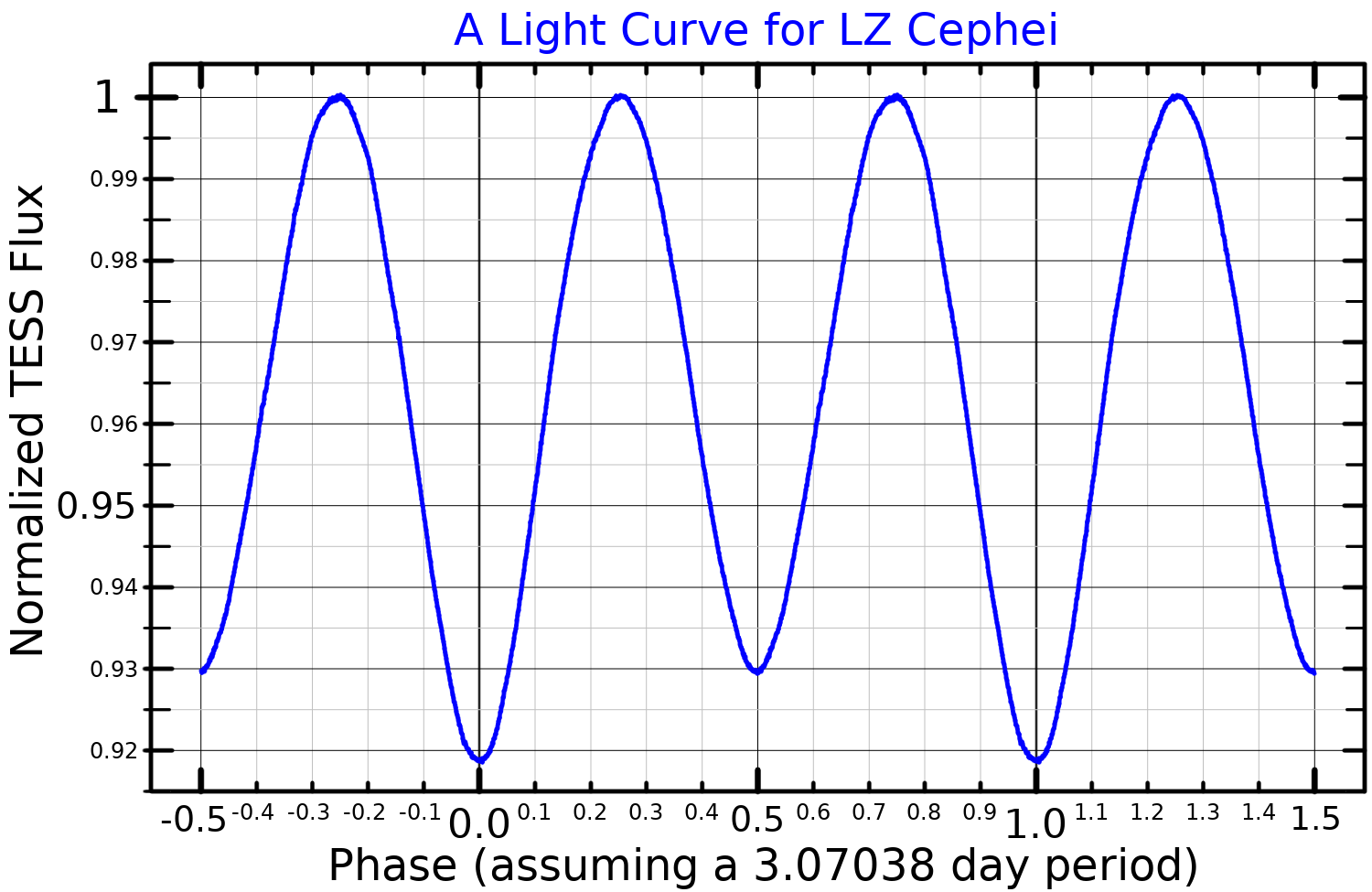
- A light curve for LZ Cephei, plotted from TESS data

Observation data Epoch J2000.0 Equinox J2000.0
- Constellation: Cepheus
- Right ascension: 22^{h} 02^{m} 04.57263^{s}
- Declination: +58° 00′ 01.3098″
- Apparent magnitude (V): 5.6

Characteristics
- Spectral type: O 9III (primary) + ON 9.7V (secondary)
- Variable type: Rotating ellipsoidal variable

Astrometry
Proper motion (μ)	RA: −3.096±0.061 mas/yr Dec.: −2.611±0.054 mas/yr
Parallax (π)	0.9070±0.0525 mas
Distance	3,600 ± 200 ly (1,100 ± 60 pc)

Orbit
Period (P)	3.070507 d
Eccentricity (e)	0.0
Inclination (i)	49±2.4°
Semi-amplitude (K_{1}) (primary)	88.72±1.02 km/s
Semi-amplitude (K_{2}) (secondary)	224.48±2.58 km/s

Details

Primary
Mass	16.0 M_{☉}
Radius	11.7+3.3 −2.7 R_{☉}
Luminosity	79,000 L_{☉}
Surface gravity (log g)	3.71±0.02 cgs
Temperature	32,000±1,000 K

Secondary
Mass	6.5 M_{☉}
Radius	9.4+2.6 −2.2 R_{☉}
Luminosity	45,000 L_{☉}
Surface gravity (log g)	3.48±0.02 cgs
Temperature	28,000±1,000 K

Other designations
- 14 Cephei, HD 209481, BD+57 2441, HIP 108772, HR 8406, SAO 33990

Database references
SIMBAD	data

LZ Cephei, also known by its Flamsteed designation 14 Cephei, is a star about 3,600 light years from the Earth, in the constellation Cepheus. Its apparent magnitude is 5.6, making it faintly visible to the naked eye of an observer far from city lights. The star is a rotating ellipsoidal variable whose brightness, as measured by the Hipparcos satellite, varies between magnitude 5.52 and 5.61.

LZ Cephei was discovered to be a binary star by William Edmund Harper in 1931. The orbital elements were first calculated by Robert Methven Petrie in 1962. It was discovered to be a variable star in 1972 by N. Kameswara Rao, using the Lick Observatory's 24 inch telescope. The star was given the variable star designation LZ Cephei in 1973. It was classified as an ellipsoidal variable by Hill et al. in 1976.

A 2011 study of LZ Cephei concluded that the existing data are best explained if the system is a semi-detached binary with either the primary or secondary star nearly filling its Roche lobe. The secondary star, now less massive than the primary, was originally the more massive star, and matter has been transferred from the secondary to the primary.
