= Rho2 Cephei =

Star in the constellation Cepheus

Rho^{2} Cephei
- Location of ρ^{2} Cephei (circled in red)

Observation data Epoch J2000.0 Equinox J2000.0 (ICRS)
- Constellation: Cepheus
- Right ascension: 22^{h} 29^{m} 52.97797^{s}
- Declination: +78° 49′ 27.4320″
- Apparent magnitude (V): 5.50

Characteristics
- Evolutionary stage: main sequence
- Spectral type: A3 V
- U−B color index: +0.07
- B−V color index: +0.06

Astrometry
Radial velocity (R_{v})	−1.25±0.37 km/s
Proper motion (μ)	RA: +3.543 mas/yr Dec.: −20.840 mas/yr
Parallax (π)	13.6037±0.0544 mas
Distance	239.8 ± 1.0 ly (73.5 ± 0.3 pc)
Absolute magnitude (M_{V})	+1.07

Details
Mass	2.26+0.04 −0.11 M_{☉}
Radius	2.43+0.04 −0.02 R_{☉}
Luminosity	36.2+0.8 −5.4 L_{☉}
Surface gravity (log g)	3.60 cgs
Temperature	7,405+17 −33 K
Rotational velocity (v sin i)	133 km/s
Age	85 Myr; 503+146 −87 Myr

Other designations
- ρ Cephei, ρ^{2} Cep, 29 Cephei, BD+78°801, FK5 1593, HD 213798, HIP 111056, HR 8591, SAO 10402

Database references
SIMBAD	data

Rho^{2} Cephei is a solitary star in the northern constellation of Cepheus. Its name is a Bayer designation that is Latinized from ρ^{2} Cephei, or simply ρ Cephei, and abbreviated Rho^{2} Cep or ρ^{2} Cep. With an apparent visual magnitude of 5.50, it is faintly visible to the naked eye, forming an optical pair with Rho^{1} Cephei. Based upon an annual parallax shift of 13.6 mas as seen from the Earth, it is located about 240 light years from the Sun.

Rho^{2} Cephei is an A-type main sequence star with a stellar classification of A3 V, estimated to be 500 million years old. It has a high rate of rotation, showing a projected rotational velocity of 133 km/s. The star has an estimated 2.26 times the mass of the Sun and 2.43 times the Sun's radius. It is radiating 36 times the luminosity of the Sun from its photosphere at an effective temperature of 7,405 K.

This star has been called by the Arabic name Al Kalb al Rāʽi, the Shepherd's Dog, which is better known (with the spelling Cebalrai) as a name for β Ophiuchi.
