= 11 Cephei =

Star in the constellation Cepheus

- Location of 11 Cephei (circled in red)

Observation data Epoch J2000 Equinox J2000
- Constellation: Cepheus
- Right ascension: 21^{h} 41^{m} 55.30845^{s}
- Declination: +71° 18′ 41.2675″
- Apparent magnitude (V): 4.55

Characteristics
- Evolutionary stage: horizontal branch
- Spectral type: K0.5 III
- Apparent magnitude (G): 4.23
- B−V color index: 1.108±0.004

Astrometry
Radial velocity (R_{v})	−38.36±0.19 km/s
Proper motion (μ)	RA: +111.840±0.129 mas/yr Dec.: +92.204±0.118 mas/yr
Parallax (π)	18.1808±0.1192 mas
Distance	179 ± 1 ly (55.0 ± 0.4 pc)
Absolute magnitude (M_{V})	0.16

Details
Mass	2.38±0.07 M_{☉}
Radius	10.93+0.27 −0.26 R_{☉}
Luminosity	94.9±8.8 L_{☉}
Surface gravity (log g)	2.41 cgs
Temperature	5,446±113 K
Metallicity [Fe/H]	0.17 dex
Rotational velocity (v sin i)	1.0 km/s
Age	670±60 Myr

Other designations
- 11 Cep, BD+70°1193, FK5 817, HD 206952, HIP 107119, HR 8317, SAO 10126

Database references
SIMBAD	data

11 Cephei is a single star in the northern constellation of Cepheus, located 179 light years away from the Sun. It is visible to the naked eye as a faint, orange-hued star with an apparent visual magnitude of 4.55. The star has a relatively high proper motion, traversing the celestial sphere at the rate of 0.153 arc seconds per annum. It is moving closer to the Earth with a heliocentric radial velocity of −38 km/s.

This is an aging giant star with a stellar classification of K0.5 III, having exhausted the hydrogen at its core and expanded. It is a red clump giant, which means it is currently on the horizontal branch and is generating energy through helium fusion at the core. 11 Cephei is 670 million years old with 2.4 times the mass of the Sun and 11 times the Sun's radius. It is radiating around 95 times the luminosity of the Sun from its swollen photosphere at an effective temperature of 5,446 K.
