= HR 8442 =

Spectroscopic binary star in the constellation Cepheus

Observation data Epoch J2000.0 Equinox ICRS
- Constellation: Cepheus
- Right ascension: 22^{h} 07^{m} 09.634^{s}
- Declination: +58° 50′ 26.58″
- Apparent magnitude (V): 6.32

Characteristics
- Spectral type: G8.6 III
- U−B color index: 0.63
- B−V color index: 0.88

Astrometry
Radial velocity (R_{v})	−7.37±0.03 km/s
Proper motion (μ)	RA: −16.09±0.41 mas/yr Dec.: −22.30±0.41 mas/yr
Parallax (π)	4.80±0.46 mas
Distance	680 ± 70 ly (210 ± 20 pc)
Absolute magnitude (M_{V})	−0.3±0.2

Orbit
Primary	HR 8442A
Name	HR 8442B
Period (P)	737.4±0.4 days
Eccentricity (e)	0.308±0.007
Periastron epoch (T)	54113.3±2.1
Argument of periastron (ω) (secondary)	61.9±1.3°
Semi-amplitude (K_{1}) (primary)	5.55±0.04 km/s

Details
Mass	2.97 M_{☉}
Radius	14.4 R_{☉}
Luminosity	143 L_{☉}
Surface gravity (log g)	3.21 cgs
Temperature	5261±40 K
Rotational velocity (v sin i)	1.8 km/s
Age	0.35 Gyr

Other designations
- BD+58 2393, FK5 3770, HD 210220, HIP 109190, HR 8442, SAO 34072

Database references
SIMBAD	data

HR 8442 is a spectroscopic binary star in the constellation Cepheus. The primary is a G type giant star while the secondary's spectral type is unknown.

The spectroscopic binary nature of the star was first noticed by Jose Renan de Medeiros and Michel Mayor using radial velocity measurements from the Coravel spectrometer at Haute-Provence Observatory. Roger Griffin then placed the star on his observing program at Cambridge Observatory leading to an orbital solution being published in 2015.
