= 24 Cephei =

Star in the constellation Cepheus

- Location of 24 Cephei (circled in red)

Observation data Epoch J2000 Equinox ICRS
- Constellation: Cepheus
- Right ascension: 22^{h} 09^{m} 48.43066^{s}
- Declination: +72° 20′ 28.3397″
- Apparent magnitude (V): 4.79

Characteristics
- Evolutionary stage: red giant branch
- Spectral type: G7 II-III
- B−V color index: 0.898

Astrometry
Radial velocity (R_{v})	−16.58 km/s
Proper motion (μ)	RA: +33.041 mas/yr Dec.: +2.809 mas/yr
Parallax (π)	8.2802±0.0916 mas
Distance	394 ± 4 ly (121 ± 1 pc)
Absolute magnitude (M_{V})	−0.519

Details
Mass	3.50 M_{☉}
Radius	16.8 R_{☉}
Luminosity	209 L_{☉}
Surface gravity (log g)	2.31±0.33 cgs
Temperature	5,023±54 K
Metallicity [Fe/H]	−0.16±0.11 dex
Rotational velocity (v sin i)	6.5 km/s
Age	234 Myr

Other designations
- 24 Cep, BD+71°1111, FK5 837, HD 210807, HIP 109400, HR 8468, SAO 10265

Database references
SIMBAD	data

24 Cephei is a single, yellow-hued star in the northern circumpolar constellation of Cepheus. With an apparent visual magnitude of 4.79, it is faintly visible to the naked eye. The distance to this star, based upon an annual parallax shift of 8.28 mas, is around 394 light years. It is moving closer with a heliocentric radial velocity of −17 km/s.

Keenan and McNeil (1989) listed a stellar classification of G7 II-III for 24 Cep, matching the spectrum of an evolved G-type star with blended features of a bright giant and a giant star. Older sources list a class of G8 III, which would suggest an ordinary giant star. At the age of 234 million years, it has an estimated 3.5 times the mass of the Sun and has expanded to about 17 times the Sun's radius. The star is radiating 199 times the Sun's luminosity from its enlarged photosphere at an effective temperature of 5,023 K. These coordinates are a source of X-ray emission.
