= 9 Cephei =

Star in the constellation Cepheus

- Location of 9 Cephei (circled)

Observation data Epoch J2000.0 Equinox ICRS
- Constellation: Cepheus
- Right ascension: 21^{h} 37^{m} 55.22469^{s}
- Declination: +62° 04′ 54.9825″
- Apparent magnitude (V): 4.69 - 4.78

Characteristics
- Evolutionary stage: supergiant
- Spectral type: B2 Ib
- U−B color index: −0.54
- B−V color index: +0.30
- Variable type: α Cyg

Astrometry
Radial velocity (R_{v})	−13.50±0.8 km/s
Proper motion (μ)	RA: −1.64±0.17 mas/yr Dec.: −3.02±0.16 mas/yr
Parallax (π)	0.48±0.14 mas
Distance	950 pc
Absolute magnitude (M_{V})	−6.44

Details

Searle et al 2008
Mass	21 M_{☉}
Radius	39.8 R_{☉}
Luminosity	151,000 L_{☉}
Surface gravity (log g)	2.50 cgs
Temperature	18,000 K
Rotational velocity (v sin i)	73 km/s

Markova & Puls 2008
Mass	12 M_{☉}
Radius	32 R_{☉}
Luminosity	129,000 L_{☉}
Surface gravity (log g)	2.50 cgs
Temperature	19,200 K
Rotational velocity (v sin i)	45 km/s

Other designations
- 9 Cephei, V337 Cephei, BD+61°2169, HD 206165, HIP 106801, HR 8279, GSC 04253-02243, 2MASS J21375521+6204548

Database references
SIMBAD	data

9 Cephei (9 Cep), also known as V337 Cephei, is a variable star in the constellation Cepheus. It is visible to the naked eye.

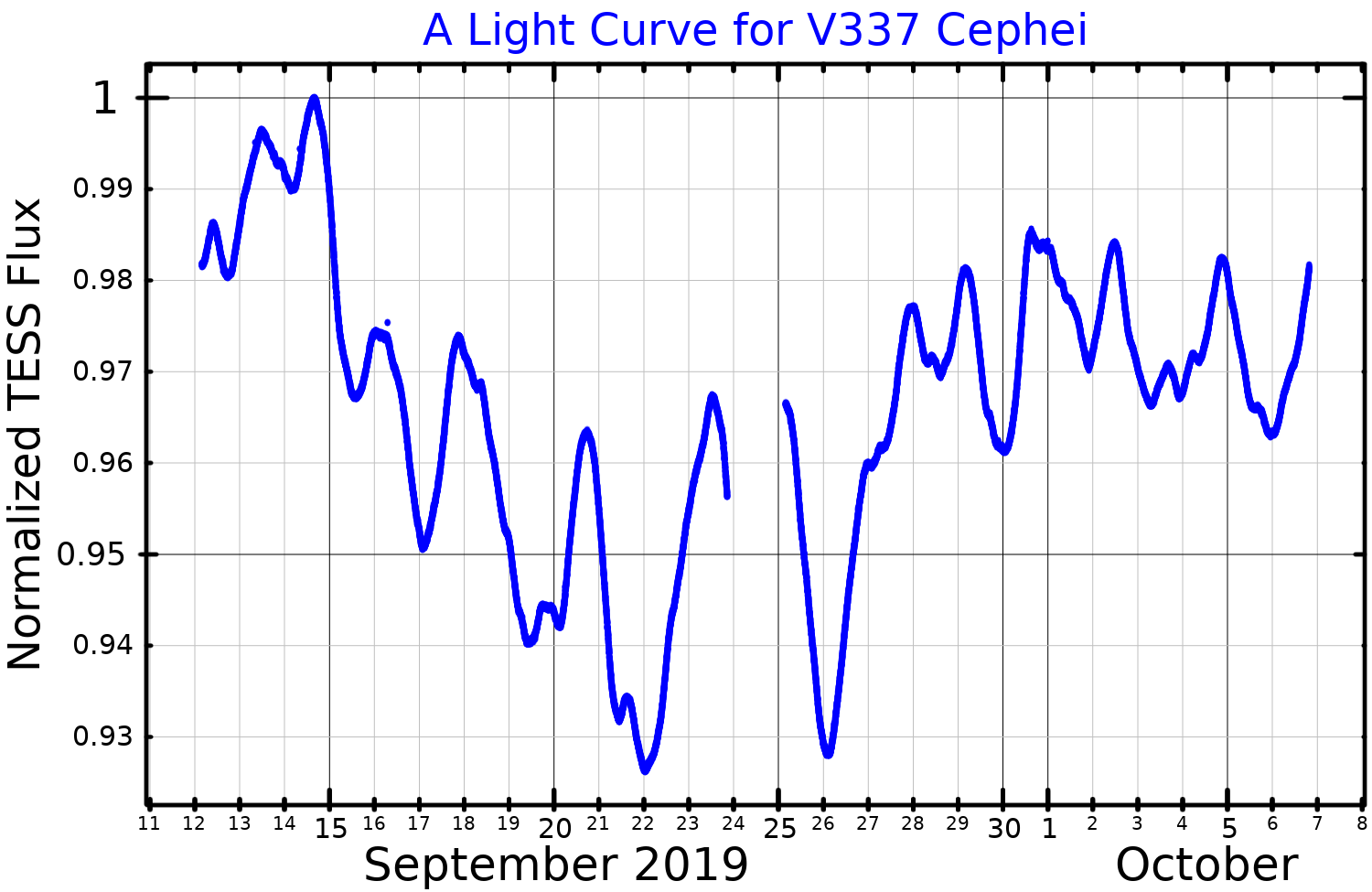
A light curve for V337 Cephei, plotted from TESS data

In 1967, Graham Hill announced his discovery that 9 Cephei is a variable star. 9 Cephei was given the name V337 Cephei and classified as an α Cygni variable in 1979. It varies irregularly between magnitude 4.69 and 4.78. A study of the Hipparcos satellite photometry showed an amplitude of 0.56 magnitudes, but could find no periodicity.

9 Cephei is considered to be a member of the Cepheus OB2 stellar association, a scattering of massive bright stars around a thousand parsecs away in the southern part of the constellation Cepheus.

Calculations of the physical properties of 9 Cephei vary considerably even from broadly similar observational data. Modelling using the non-LTE line-blanketed CMFGEN atmospheric code gives a temperature of 18,000 K, radius of 40 R_{☉}, luminosity of 151,000 L_{☉}, and mass of 21 M_{☉}. Calculations using the FASTWIND model give a temperature of 19,200 K, radius of 32 R_{☉}, luminosity of 129,000 L_{☉}, and mass of 12 M_{☉}.
