= HD 216446 =

Binary star system in the constellation Cepheus

- Location of HD 216446 (circled in red)

Observation data Epoch J2000 Equinox ICRS
- Constellation: Cepheus
- A
- Right ascension: 22^{h} 47^{m} 29.06915^{s}
- Declination: +83° 09′ 13.7835″
- Apparent magnitude (V): 4.92
- B
- Right ascension: 22^{h} 47^{m} 30.42293^{s}
- Declination: +83° 09′ 16.8515″
- Apparent magnitude (V): 9.60

Characteristics

A
- Evolutionary stage: red giant branch
- Spectral type: K3III
- B−V color index: 1.257±0.008

Astrometry

A
| Radial velocity (R_{v}) | −32.23±0.13 km/s |
| Proper motion (μ) | RA: +24.058±0.174 mas/yr Dec.: +47.224±0.114 mas/yr |
| Parallax (π) | 10.3313±0.1051 mas |
| Distance | 316 ± 3 ly (96.8 ± 1.0 pc) |
| Absolute magnitude (M_{V}) | −0.14 |

B
| Proper motion (μ) | RA: +28.006±0.026 mas/yr Dec.: +46.796±0.22 mas/yr |
| Parallax (π) | 10.5137±0.0185 mas |
| Distance | 310.2 ± 0.5 ly (95.1 ± 0.2 pc) |

Details

A
| Mass | 3.8 M_{☉} |
| Radius | 21.9 R_{☉} |
| Luminosity | 167 L_{☉} |
| Surface gravity (log g) | 1.87 cgs |
| Temperature | 4,440 K |
| Metallicity [Fe/H] | −0.10±0.06 dex |
| Rotational velocity (v sin i) | 1.0 km/s |
| Age | 6.9 Gyr |

B
| Mass | 0.88 M_{☉} |
| Radius | 1.00 R_{☉} |
| Luminosity | 0.64 L_{☉} |
| Surface gravity (log g) | 4.51 cgs |
| Temperature | 5,191 K |

Other designations
- BD+82°703, HD 216446, HIP 112519, HR 8702, SAO 3794, WDS J22475+8309

Database references
| SIMBAD | data |

HD 216446 is a binary star system in the northern circumpolar constellation of Cepheus. It is faintly visible to the naked eye with a combined apparent visual magnitude of 4.77. The system is located at a distance of approximately 316 light years from the Sun based on parallax, but is drifting closer with a radial velocity of −32 km/s. It is predicted to come to within 188.7 light-years in around 1.876 million years. The system has an absolute magnitude of −0.14.

The magnitude 4.92 primary, designated component A, is an aging giant star with a stellar classification of K3III. The luminosity class of III typically indicates that the star has exhausted the supply of hydrogen at its core, then cooled and expanded off the main sequence. At present it has 22 times the radius of the Sun. The star has a lower abundance of elements other than hydrogen and helium compared to the Sun; what astronomers term the star's metallicity. It is radiating 167 times the luminosity of the Sun from its enlarged photosphere at an effective temperature of 4,440 K.

The secondary companion, component B, is a magnitude 9.60 star located at an angular separation of 3.50″ from the primary, along a position angle of 38°, as of 1992.
