= 19 Cephei =

Star in the constellation Cepheus

- Location of 19 Cephei (circled)

Observation data Epoch J2000 Equinox ICRS
- Constellation: Cepheus
- Right ascension: 22^{h} 05^{m} 08.78995^{s}
- Declination: +62° 16′ 47.3301″
- Apparent magnitude (V): 5.08

Characteristics
- Spectral type: O9Ib
- U−B color index: −0.91
- B−V color index: +0.06

Astrometry
Radial velocity (R_{v})	−12.8±0.9 km/s
Proper motion (μ)	RA: −1.16 mas/yr Dec.: −2.96 mas/yr
Parallax (π)	1.58±0.19 mas
Distance	3,910 ly (1,200 pc)
Absolute magnitude (M_{V})	−5.45

Details
Mass	47 M_{☉}
Radius	17.0 R_{☉}
Luminosity	224,000 L_{☉}
Surface gravity (log g)	3.40±0.08 cgs
Temperature	32,983±1,428 K
Metallicity [Fe/H]	0.06±0.08 dex
Rotational velocity (v sin i)	48 km/s

Other designations
- 19 Cep, BD+61°2246, HD 209975, HIP 109017, HR 8428, SAO 19849

Database references
SIMBAD	data

19 Cephei is a supergiant star in the northern circumpolar constellation of Cepheus. It has a spectral class of O9 and is a member of Cep OB2, an OB association of massive stars located about 615 parsecs (2,010 ly) from the Sun.

The spectrum of 19 Cephei shows line profile variability on an hourly and daily timescale. This is thought to be due to the changes in the stellar wind.

Double star catalogues list several companions for 19 Cephei. The Washington Double Star Catalog describes four companions: 11th magnitude stars 20" and 56" away, and two 15th magnitude stars 4-5" away. The Catalog of Components of Double and Multiple Stars gives only the two 11th magnitude stars.

A scattered cluster of faint stars has been detected associated with 19 Cephei. The brightest likely members apart from 19 Cep itself are 10th magnitude stars.
