= Lambda Cephei =

Star in the constellation Cepheus

λ Cephei
- Location of λ Cep (circled)

Observation data Epoch J2000 Equinox ICRS
- Constellation: Cepheus
- Right ascension: 22^{h} 11^{m} 30.577^{s}
- Declination: +59° 24′ 52.15″
- Apparent magnitude (V): +5.050

Characteristics
- Evolutionary stage: Blue supergiant
- Spectral type: O6.5If(n)p
- U−B color index: −0.622
- B−V color index: +0.237
- Variable type: Suspected

Astrometry
Radial velocity (R_{v})	−75.10 km/s
Proper motion (μ)	RA: −7.020 mas/yr Dec.: −10.812 mas/yr
Parallax (π)	1.1761±0.0818 mas
Distance	2,800 ± 200 ly (850 ± 60 pc)
Absolute magnitude (M_{V})	−6.43+0.11 −0.12

Details
Mass	51.4+15.2 −12.0 M_{☉}
Radius	18 – 21 R_{☉}
Luminosity	630,000 L_{☉}
Surface gravity (log g)	3.54 cgs
Temperature	36,000 K
Rotational velocity (v sin i)	210 km/s
Age	4.0±0.2 Myr

Other designations
- Lambda Cephei, 22 Cephei, NSV 14069, BD+58 2402, GC 31066, HD 210839, HIP 109556, HR 8469, SAO 34149, GSC 03981-01585

Database references
SIMBAD	data

Lambda Cephei is a blue supergiant star in the northern constellation of Cepheus. Its name is a Bayer designation that is Latinized from λ Cephei, and is abbreviated Lambda Cep or λ Cep. This star is visible to the naked eye with an apparent visual magnitude of +5.050. Based on parallax measurements, it is located at a distance of approximately 2,800 light years. It is one of the hottest and most luminous stars visible to the naked eye.

== Characteristics ==
It is a hot O6.5 supergiant star, with an absolute brightness around half a million times that of the Sun and a radius around 20 times as big, and with a mass that has been estimated to be between 45 and 60 solar masses.

Lambda Cephei turns around its axis in less than three days compared to the 24.47 days that the Sun needs to complete a full rotation and seems to be single, with no companions. Its ultimate fate is to explode as a supernova. Due to its very large initial mass, it will most likely leave behind a black hole.

Lambda Cephei is a runaway star that seems to have been expelled of the stellar association Cepheus OB3, that lies at 2,800 light-years, roughly 2.5 million years ago. Its motion through the interstellar medium is producing a shockwave in front of the gases that surround it and in the direction towards it moves.
