= Nu Cephei =

Star in the constellation Cepheus

ν Cephei
- Location of ν Cephei (circled in red)

Observation data Epoch J2000.0 Equinox ICRS
- Constellation: Cepheus
- Right ascension: 21^{h} 45^{m} 26.925^{s}
- Declination: +61° 07′ 14.900″
- Apparent magnitude (V): 4.25 to 4.35

Characteristics
- Evolutionary stage: Blue supergiant
- Spectral type: A2Iab
- Apparent magnitude (U): 4.94
- Apparent magnitude (B): 4.81
- Apparent magnitude (J): 3.14
- Apparent magnitude (K): 2.85
- U−B color index: +0.119
- B−V color index: +0.518
- Variable type: Alpha Cygni

Astrometry
Radial velocity (R_{v})	−25.90 km/s
Proper motion (μ)	RA: −3.545 mas/yr Dec.: −2.025 mas/yr
Parallax (π)	0.9321±0.0865 mas
Distance	3,500 ± 300 ly (1,070 ± 100 pc)
Absolute magnitude (M_{V})	−6.82

Details
Mass	15.4 M_{☉}
Radius	137 R_{☉}
Luminosity	102,000 L_{☉}
Surface gravity (log g)	1.35 cgs
Temperature	8,800 K
Rotational velocity (v sin i)	15 km/s
Age	8 Myr

Other designations
- ν Cep, 10 Cephei, BD+60°2288, FK5 1572, HD 207260, HIP 107418, HR 8334, SAO 19624

Database references
SIMBAD	data

Nu Cephei is a blue-hued variable star in the northern constellation Cepheus. Its name is a Bayer designation that is Latinized from ν Cephei, and abbreviated Nu Cep or ν Cep. This is a pulsating α Cygni variable star that ranges in apparent visual magnitude from 4.25 to 4.35. This is bright enough to make it visible to the naked eye as a fourth-magnitude star. Distance estimates place it at about 3,500 light-years from Earth. It is drifting closer to the Sun with a line of sight velocity component of −26 km/s.

ν Cephei is a member of the Cepheus OB2 stellar association, which includes stars such as μ Cephei and VV Cephei.

== Properties ==
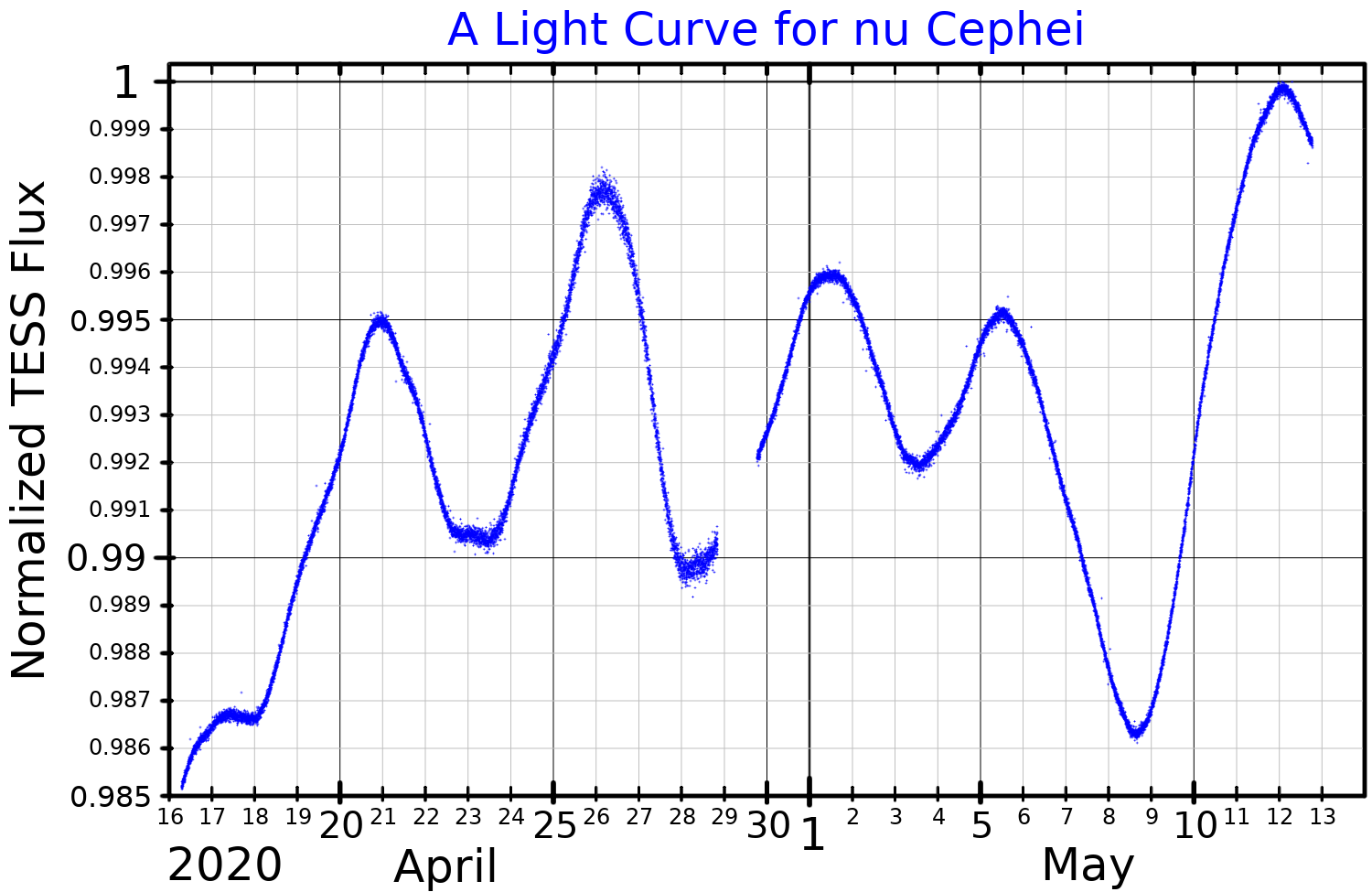
A light curve for Nu Cephei, plotted from TESS data,

The stellar classification of this star is A2Iab, matching an evolved blue supergiant. It began life as an approximately 20 M_{☉} main sequence star around eight million years ago. Nu Cephei has exhausted its core hydrogen and expanded and cooled into a supergiant. Elemental abundance analyses indicate that it has not yet spent time as a red supergiant, which would have brought about convection of fusion products to the surface in a dredge-up.

ν Cephei is currently about 15 times as massive as the sun, 137 times as large, and 100,000 times as luminous. Its large size and luminosity cause it to be somewhat unstable and produce irregular pulsations. This is a common feature of class A and B supergiants, which are grouped as α Cygni variable stars. Variability was first reported by Helmut Abt in 1957. The brightness changes by at most a tenth of a magnitude. A variety of values for the variability period have been published, including 5 to 10 days, 7.6 days and 90 days.
