= Cepheus (constellation) =

Constellation in the northern celestial hemisphere

- Constellation
- List of stars in Cepheus
- Abbreviation: Cep
- Genitive: Cephei
- Pronunciation: /ˈsiːfiəs/ or /ˈsiːfjuːs/; genitive /ˈsiːfiaɪ/
- Symbolism: the King/King Cepheus
- Right ascension: 20^{h} 01^{m} 56.4481^{s}–09^{h} 03^{m} 19.7931^{s}
- Declination: 88.6638870°–53.3532715°
- Area: 588 sq. deg. (27th)
- Main stars: 7
- Bayer/Flamsteed stars: 43
- Stars brighter than 3.00^{m}: 1
- Stars within 10.00 pc (32.62 ly): 3
- Brightest star: α Cep (Alderamin) (2.45^{m})
- Nearest star: Kruger 60
- Messier objects: 0
- Meteor showers: 0
- Bordering constellations: Cygnus; Lacerta; Cassiopeia; Camelopardalis; Draco; Ursa Minor
- Visible at latitudes between +90° and −1°. Best visible at 21:00 (9 p.m.) during the month of November.

Cepheus is a constellation in the deep northern sky, named after Cepheus, a king of Aethiopia in Greek mythology. It is one of the 48 constellations listed by the second century astronomer Ptolemy, and it remains one of the 88 constellations in the modern times.

The constellation's brightest star is Alderamin (Alpha Cephei), with an apparent magnitude of 2.5. Delta Cephei is the prototype of an important class of star known as a Cepheid variable. RW Cephei, an orange hypergiant, together with the red supergiants Mu Cephei, MY Cephei, VV Cephei, V381 Cephei, and V354 Cephei are among the largest stars known. In addition, Cepheus also has the hyperluminous quasar S5 0014+81, which hosts an ultramassive black hole in its core, reported at 40 billion solar masses, about 10,000 times more massive than the central black hole of the Milky Way, making this among the most massive black holes currently known.

== History and mythology ==
Cepheus was the King of Aethiopia. He was married to Cassiopeia and was the father of Andromeda, both of whom are immortalized as modern day constellations along with Cepheus.

== Features ==
The constellation Cepheus showing the IAU boundaries, constellation stick figure, and labels for its brightest stars.

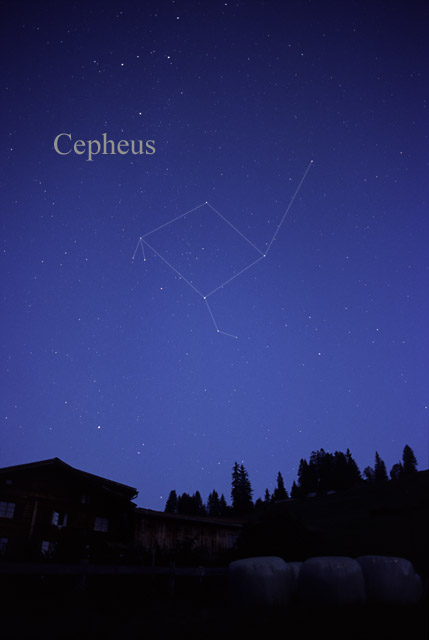
The constellation Cepheus as it may be seen by the naked eye. The 5 brightest stars make an asterism that is described as a child's drawing of a house

Alderamin, also known as Alpha Cephei, is the brightest star in the constellation, with an apparent magnitude of 2.51. Gamma Cephei, also known as Errai, is the second-brightest star in the constellation, with an apparent magnitude of 3.21. It is a binary star, made up by an orange giant or subgiant and a red dwarf. The primary component hosts one exoplanet, Gamma Cephei Ab (Tadmor). Delta Cephei is a yellow-hued supergiant star 980 light-years from Earth and the prototype of the class of the Cepheid variables. It was discovered to be variable by John Goodricke in 1784. It varies between 3.5^{m} and 4.4^{m} over a period of 5 days and 9 hours. The Cepheids are a class of pulsating variable stars; Delta Cephei has a minimum size of 40 solar diameters and a maximum size of 46 solar diameters. It is also a double star; the primary star also has a wide-set blue-hued companion of magnitude 6.3.

There are four red supergiants in the constellation that are visible to the naked eye. Mu Cephei is also known as the Garnet Star due to its deep red colour. It is a semiregular variable star with a minimum magnitude of 5.1 and a maximum magnitude of 3.4. Its period is approximately 2 years. The star's radius has been estimated to be from 972 solar radii (4.52 AU) to 1,420 solar radii (6.6 AU). If it were placed at the center of the Solar System, it would likely extend past the orbit of Jupiter. The second, VV Cephei A, is a semiregular variable star, located approximately 5,000 light-years from Earth. It has a minimum magnitude of 5.4 and a maximum magnitude of 4.8, and is paired with a blue main sequence star called VV Cephei B. The red supergiant primary is around 1,050 times larger than the Sun. VV Cephei is also an unusually long-period eclipsing binary, but the eclipses, which occur every 20.3 years, are too faint to be observed with the unaided eye. The third, Zeta Cephei, is not as large as Mu Cephei and VV Cephei A with a diameter less than 200 times that of the Sun; however, its surface would lie between the orbits of Venus and Earth if placed at the center of the Solar System. Zeta Cephei has an apparent magnitude of 3.35, being the fourth-brightest star in the constellation. The last and faintest is V381 Cephei Aa with a maximum magnitude of 5.5. It is part of a triple star system similar to VV Cephei, and has a diameter 980 times that of the Sun. All four stars have initial masses more than eight times that of the Sun and are accepted core-collapse supernova candidates.

Nu Cephei is a blue supergiant similar to Deneb with an initial mass of over 20 solar masses. It belongs to the Cepheus OB2 stellar association along with Mu Cephei and VV Cephei, which have similar initial masses.

There are several prominent double stars and binary stars in Cepheus. Omicron Cephei is a binary star with a period of 800 years. The system, 211 light-years from Earth, consists of an orange-hued giant primary of magnitude 4.9 and a secondary of magnitude 7.1. Xi Cephei is another binary star, 102 light-years from Earth, with a period of 4,000 years. It has a blue-white primary of magnitude 4.4 and a yellow secondary of magnitude 6.5.

Krüger 60 is an 11th-magnitude binary star consisting of two red dwarfs. The star system is one of the nearest, being only 13 light-years away from Earth. It was once proposed as a possible home system for 2I/Borisov, the first accepted interstellar comet, but this was later rejected.

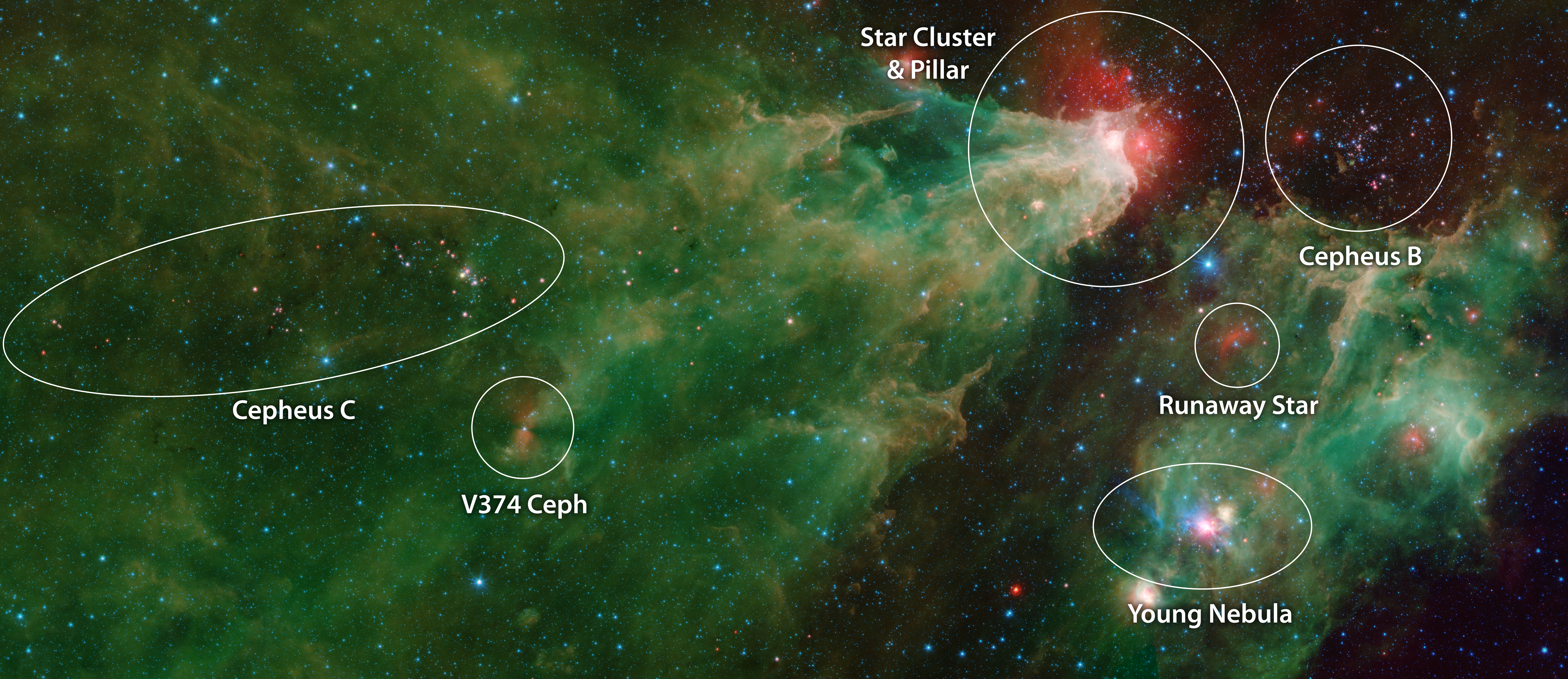
Annotated map of the Cepheus OB3 Molecular Cloud showing Cepheus A labeled as "Young Nebula", Cepheus B, & Cepheus C. A runaway star with a bow shock and V374 Cephei with a nebulosity are labelled here – Spitzer Space Telescope (30 May 2019)

=== Deep-sky objects ===
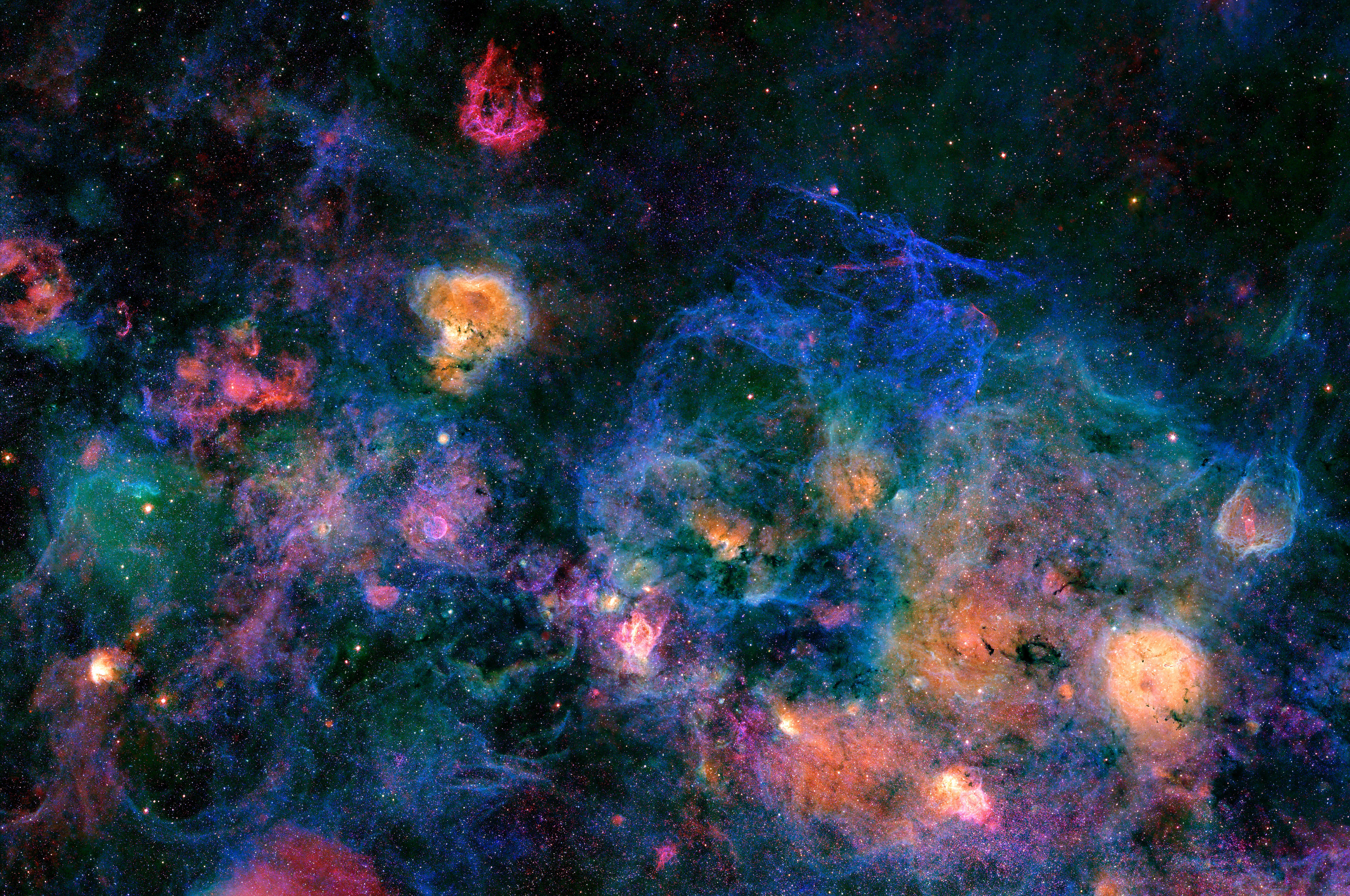
Emission nebula in Cepheus seen by the Northern Sky Narrowband Survey.

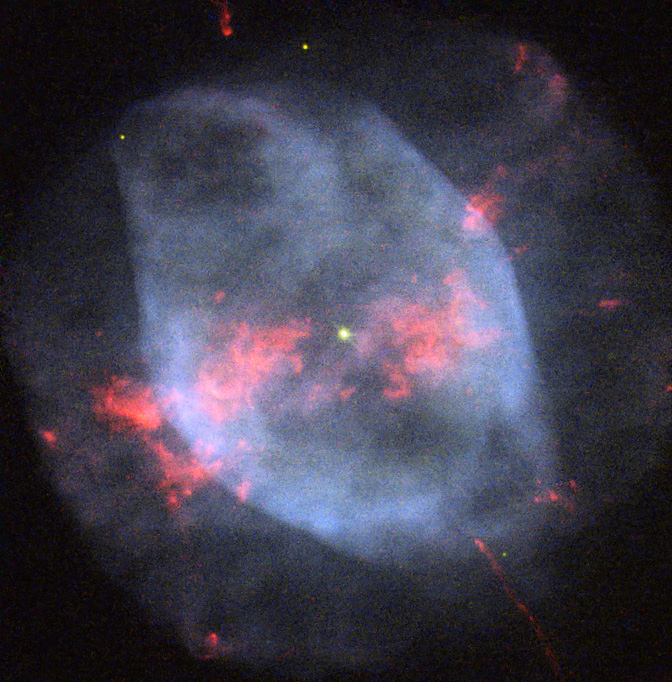
NGC 7354 is a planetary nebula located in the constellation Cepheus

The constellation Cepheus is rich in star-forming regions and emission nebulae of various kinds. Most of the structures visible in the wide-field view on the right (the image height is 22°) lie in the Orion Arm of the Milky Way, roughly 2,800 to 3,600 light-years away. The following is an overview of some prominent deep-sky objects:

- NGC 188 is an open cluster that has the distinction of being the closest open cluster to the north celestial pole, as well as one of the oldest-known open clusters.
- NGC 6946 is a spiral galaxy in which ten supernovae have been observed, more than in any other galaxy. It is sometimes called the Fireworks Galaxy.
- IC 469 is another spiral galaxy, characterized by a compact nucleus, of oval shape, with perceptible side arms.
- The nebula NGC 7538 is home to the largest-yet-discovered protostar.
- NGC 7023 is a reflection nebula with an associated star cluster (Collinder 429); it has an overall magnitude of 7.7 and is 1,400 light-years from Earth. The nebula and cluster are located near Beta Cephei and T Cephei.
- Sh 2-155, also known as the Cave Nebula, is a dim and very diffuse bright nebula within a larger nebula complex containing emission, reflection, and dark nebulosity.
- The quasar 6C B0014+8120 is one of the most powerful objects in the universe, powered by a supermassive black hole which is as massive as 40 billion Suns.
- Sh 2-131 is ionized by the stars of the cluster IC 1396(the two are often treated as essentially the same object). Embedded within it is a dark nebula known as the Elephant's Trunk.
- NGC 7822 (also known as Sh 2-171) is an H II region with an apparent diameter of about 3°

== Visualizations ==
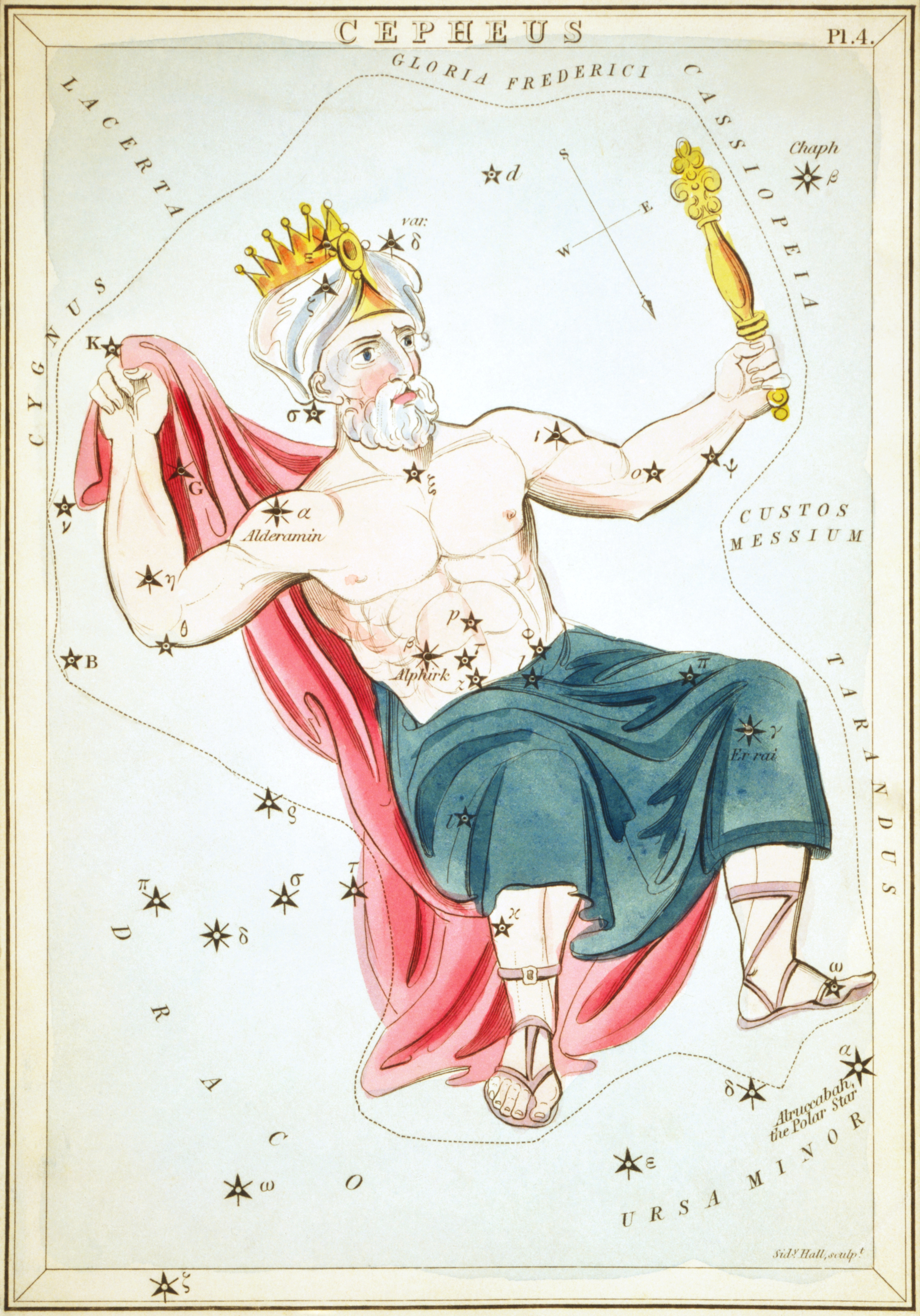
Cepheus as depicted in Urania's Mirror, a set of constellation cards published in London, c. 1825

Cepheus is most commonly depicted as holding his arms aloft, praying for the deities to spare the life of Andromeda. He also is depicted as a more regal monarch sitting on his throne.

== Equivalents ==
In Chinese astronomy, the stars of the constellation Cepheus are found in two areas: the Purple Forbidden enclosure (紫微垣, Zǐ Wēi Yuán) and the Black Tortoise of the North (北方玄武, Běi Fāng Xuán Wǔ).

== Namesakes ==
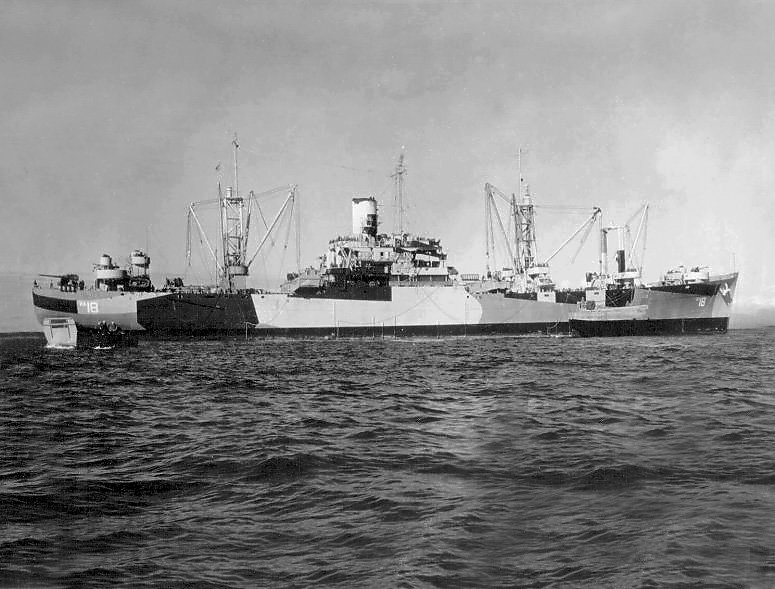
USS Cepheus (AKA-18), named after the constellation

- USS Cepheus (AKA-18) and USS Cepheus (AK-265), United States Navy ships.
- Update 3.4 "Cepheus" of the videogame Stellaris

== See also ==
- Cepheus in Chinese astronomy
- Cepheus OB2 Region
- Cepheus OB3 Region
- Cepheus OB4 Region
