= Albireo =

Double star system in the constellation Cygnus

- Location of Albireo (circled in red)

Observation data Epoch J2000.0 Equinox ICRS
- Constellation: Cygnus
- Albireo Aa
- Right ascension: 19^{h} 30^{m} 43.286^{s}
- Declination: +27° 57′ 34.84″
- Apparent magnitude (V): 3.21
- Albireo Ac
- Right ascension: 19^{h} 30^{m} 43.295^{s}
- Declination: +27° 57′ 34.62″
- Apparent magnitude (V): 5.85
- Albireo B
- Right ascension: 19^{h} 30^{m} 45.3962^{s}
- Declination: +27° 57′ 54.989″
- Apparent magnitude (V): 5.11

Characteristics

Albireo Aa
- Evolutionary stage: horizontal branch
- Spectral type: K2II
- B−V color index: +1.13
- V−R color index: +0.92

Albireo Ac
- Evolutionary stage: main sequence
- Spectral type: B8:p
- B−V color index: +0.09
- V−R color index: +0.09

Albireo B
- Evolutionary stage: main sequence
- Spectral type: B8Ve
- U−B color index: −0.32
- B−V color index: −0.10

Astrometry

Albireo A
| Radial velocity (R_{v}) | −23.54 km/s |
| Proper motion (μ) | RA: +4.915 mas/yr Dec.: −11.127 mas/yr |
| Parallax (π) | 8.9816±0.4474 mas |
| Distance | 364.8+15.6 −15.3 ly (111.9+4.8 −4.7 pc) |

Albireo Aa
| Absolute magnitude (M_{V}) | −2.45 |

Albireo Ac
| Absolute magnitude (M_{V}) | −0.25 |

Albireo B
| Radial velocity (R_{v}) | −25.158±0.019 km/s |
| Proper motion (μ) | RA: −1.078 mas/yr Dec.: −1.540 mas/yr |
| Parallax (π) | 8.1896±0.0781 mas |
| Distance | 395.4+2.9 −3.3 ly (121.3+0.9 −1 pc) |
| Absolute magnitude (M_{V}) | −0.32 |

Position (relative to Albireo A)
| Component | Albireo B |
| Epoch of observation | 2006 |
| Angular distance | 35.3″ |
| Position angle | 54° |

Orbit
| Primary | Aa |
| Secondary | Ac |
| Period (P) | 121.65+3.34 −2.90 yr |
| Semi-major axis (a) | 0.401+0.007 −0.006″ |
| Eccentricity (e) | 0.20+0.01 −0.02 |
| Inclination (i) | 156.15+2.90 −2.63° |
| Longitude of the node (Ω) | 84.43+5.27 −4.50° |
| Periastron epoch (T) | B2026.36 |
| Argument of periastron (ω) (secondary) | 54.72+1.88 −2.24° |
| Semi-amplitude (K_{1}) (primary) | 2.91+0.09 −0.12 km/s |

Orbit
| Primary | Aa |
| Secondary | Ad |
| Period (P) | 1.016 ± 0.015 yr |
| Semi-major axis (a) | 1.9 AU |
| Eccentricity (e) | 0.062±0.057 |
| Inclination (i) | 156° |
| Periastron epoch (T) | 2458867±1 JD |
| Semi-amplitude (K_{1}) (primary) | 0.341±0.025 km/s |

Details

Albireo Aa
| Mass | 5.2 M_{☉} |
| Radius | 58.69+2.83 −3.12 R_{☉} |
| Luminosity (bolometric) | 1,259 L_{☉} |
| Surface gravity (log g) | 1.68±0.03 cgs |
| Temperature | 4358±10 K |
| Metallicity [Fe/H] | −0.1 dex |
| Rotational velocity (v sin i) | 4.45±0.20 km/s |
| Age | 99 Myr |

Albireo Ac
| Mass | 2.7 M_{☉} |
| Radius | 3.0 (Note: Applying the Stefan–Boltzmann Law with a nominal solar effective temperature of 5,772 K: $$\sqrt{(5772/10000)^4 \cdot 79} = 2.96\ R_\odot$$) R_{☉} |
| Luminosity (bolometric) | 79 L_{☉} |
| Temperature | 10,000 K |

Albireo Ad
| Mass | 0.085±0.007 M_{☉} |

Albireo B
| Mass | 3.7±0.8 M_{☉} |
| Radius | 2.59 R_{☉} |
| Luminosity (bolometric) | 230±90 L_{☉} |
| Surface gravity (log g) | 4.00±0.15 cgs |
| Temperature | 13,200±600 K |
| Age | 100 Myr |

Other designations
- β Cygni, 6 Cygni, ADS 12540, CCDM J19307+2758, WDS 19307+2758
- Albireo A: β^{1} Cygni, NSV 12105, BD+27 3410, FK5 732, HD 183912/183913, HIP 95947, HR 7417, SAO 87301
- Albireo B: β^{2} Cygni, BD+27 3411, HD 183914, HIP 95951, HR 7418, SAO 87302

Database references
| SIMBAD | β Cyg (STF 4043) |
- Albireo A
- Albireo Aa
- Albireo Ab
- Albireo B

Albireo is a double star in the southern constellation of Cygnus. It has the Bayer designation Beta Cygni. The International Astronomical Union uses the name "Albireo" /ælˈbɪrioʊ/ specifically for the brightest star in the system. Although designated 'beta', it is fainter than Gamma Cygni, Delta Cygni, and Epsilon Cygni and is the fifth-brightest point of light in the constellation of Cygnus. Appearing to the naked eye to be a single star of magnitude 3, viewing through even a low-magnification telescope resolves it into its two components. The brighter yellow star, itself a very close trinary system, makes a striking colour contrast with its fainter blue companion.

== Nomenclature ==
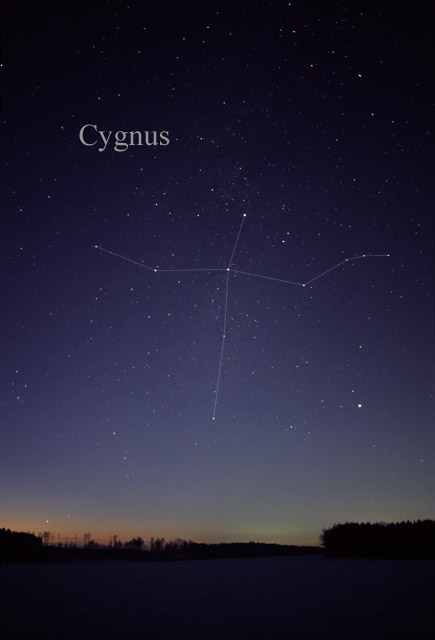
Albireo is the star in the head of the constellation of Cygnus (bottom).

β Cygni (Latinised to Beta Cygni) is the system's Bayer designation, which is abbreviated Beta Cyg or β Cyg. The brighter of the two components is designated β^{1} Cygni or Beta Cygni A and the fainter β^{2} Cygni or Beta Cygni B.

The origin of the star system's traditional name Albireo is unclear. Christian Ludwig Ideler traced it to the heading for the constellation we call Cygnus in Ptolemy's star catalog, in the translation of the Almagest by Gerard of Cremona: "Stellatio Eurisim: et est volans; et jam vocatur gallina. et dicitur eurisim quasi redolens ut lilium ab ireo" ("Constellation Eurisim: and it is the Flyer, and it is also called the Hen, and it is called Eurisim as if redolent like the lily from the 'ireo'"). (The original Greek just calls the constellation "Ορνιθος αστερισμος", "the constellation of the Bird".) The word "ireo" is obscure as well – Ideler suggests that Gerard took "Eurisim" to mean the plant Erysimum, which is called irio in Latin, but the ablative case of that is not "ireo" but irione. In any case, Ideler proposed that (somehow) the phrase "ab ireo" was applied to the star at the head of the bird, and this became "Albireo" when an "l" was mistakenly inserted as though it was an Arabic name. Ideler also supposed that the name Eurisim was a mistaken transliteration of the Arabic name "Urnis" for Cygnus (from the Greek "Ορνις").

In 2016, the International Astronomical Union (IAU) organized a Working Group on Star Names (WGSN) to catalog and standardize proper names for stars. The WGSN's first bulletin of July 2016 included a table of the first two batches of names approved by the WGSN; which included Albireo for β Cygni Aa. It is now so entered in the IAU Catalog of Star Names.

Medieval Arabic-speaking astronomers called Beta Cygni minqār al-dajāja^{h} (English: the hen's beak). The term minqār al-dajāja^{h} (منقار الدجاجة) or Menchir al Dedjadjet appeared in the catalogue of stars in the Calendarium of Al Achsasi Al Mouakket, which was translated into Latin as Rostrum Gallinae, meaning the hen's beak.

Since Cygnus is the swan, and Beta Cygni is located at the head of the swan, it is sometimes called the "beak star". With Deneb, Gamma Cygni (Sadr), Delta Cygni, and Epsilon Cygni (Gienah), it forms the asterism called the Northern Cross.

== Properties ==
Albireo A and B

Beta Cygni is about 420 light-years (129 pc) away from the Sun. When viewed with the naked eye, Albireo appears to be a single star. However, in a telescope it resolves into a double star consisting of β Cygni A (amber, apparent magnitude 3.1), and β Cygni B (blue-green, apparent magnitude 5.1). Separated by 35 seconds of arc, the two components provide one of the best contrasting double stars in the sky due to their different colors.

It is not known whether the two components β Cygni A and B are orbiting around each other in a physical binary system, or if they are merely an optical double. If they are a physical binary, their orbital period is probably at least 100,000 years. Some experts, however, support the optical double argument, based on observations that suggest different proper motions for the components, which implies that they are unrelated. The primary and secondary also have different measured distances from the Hipparcos mission – 434 ± 20 light-years (133 ± 6 pc) for the primary and 401 ± 13 light-years (123 ± 4 pc) for the secondary. More recently the Gaia mission has measured distances of about 330–390 light years (100–120 parsecs) for both components, but noise in the astrometric measurements for the stars means that data from Gaia's second data release is not yet sufficient to determine whether the stars are physically associated.

In around 3.87 million years, Albireo will become the brightest star in the night sky. It will peak in brightness with an apparent magnitude of –0.53 in 4.61 million years.

There are a further 10 faint companions listed in the Washington Double Star catalogue, all fainter than magnitude 10. Only one is closer to the primary than Albireo B, with the others up to 142" away.

=== Albireo A ===
The spectrum of Beta Cygni A was found to be composite when it was observed as part of the Henry Draper Memorial project in the late 19th century, leading to the supposition that it was itself double. This was supported by observations from 1898 to 1918 which showed that it had a varying radial velocity. In 1923, the two components were identified in the Henry Draper Catalogue as HD 183912 and HD 183913.

In 1976 speckle interferometry was used to resolve a companion using the 2.1-meter telescope at the Kitt Peak National Observatory. It was measured at a separation of 0.44", and it is noted that the observation was inconsistent with the Haute-Provence observations and hence not of the same star. Although these observations pre-dated those at Haute-Provence, they were not published until 1982 and this component is designated Ac in the Washington Double Star Catalog. It is designated as component C in the Catalog of Components of Double and Multiple Stars, not to be confused with component C in the Washington Double Star Catalog which is a faint optical companion. An orbit for the pair has since been computed using interferometric measurements, but as only approximately a quarter of the orbit has been observed, the orbital parameters must be regarded as preliminary. The period of this orbit is 214 years.

In 1978, speckle interferometry observations using the 1.93m telescope at the Haute-Provence Observatory alleged the detection of a companion at 0.125". This observation was published in 1980, and the companion is referred to as component Ab in the Washington Double Star Catalog. Similarly, a star at 0.045" was reported by speckle inferterometry in 2002. However, subsequent observations failed to confirm both stars, and the existence of Albireo Ab is now considered unlikely.

In 2022, a third component was found to be orbiting Albireo Aa, named Albireo Ad. It is a very-low-mass star with around 8.5% the Sun's mass and an orbital period of 371 days.

The diameter of the primary K-type giant star has been measured using interferometry from the Navy Precision Optical Interferometer. A limb-darkened angular diameter of 4.904 mas was measured. At the parallax-derived distance of 111.4 pc, a radius equivalent to 58.69 R_{☉} is calculated.

In 2023, the Gaia team announced that, during data analysis in preparation of Gaia DR4, they had confirmed a mass discrepancy in the Aa/Ac orbit. Gaia DR4 contains more data and improved binary star orbit analysis compared to previous releases; this enabled the first direct measurement of the acceleration upon Aa by Ac. The result is that Aa accelerates considerably more than can be explained by a 2.7 M_{☉} companion like Ac is presumed to be. Rather, Ac must be on the order of 5-7 M_{☉}. The most "obvious" possibilities are that Ac is itself a very tight unresolved binary, either with a stellar companion or a compact object. Further investigation is required. The Aa acceleration discrepancy (as measured by proper motion history) was first noted in 2018.

=== Albireo B ===
β Cygni B is a fast-rotating Be star, with an equatorial rotational velocity of at least 250 kilometers per second. Its surface temperature has been spectroscopically estimated to be about 13,200 K.

β Cygni B has been reported to be a very close double, but the observations appear to have been incorrect.

== Moving group ==
Analysis of Gaia Data Release 2 astrometry suggests that four fainter stars may form a moving group along with the brighter visible components. The four are 14th, 15th, 16th, and 17th magnitudes, and are respectively 0.8°, 0.4°, 0.4°, and 3.7° from Albireo. Analysis of their colours, brightnesses, and parallaxes shows all four to be cool stars much less luminous than the Sun.

== Namesakes ==
Albireo (AK-90) was a United States Navy Crater-class cargo ship named after the star.
