= Girl (Chinese constellation) =

Chinese constellation

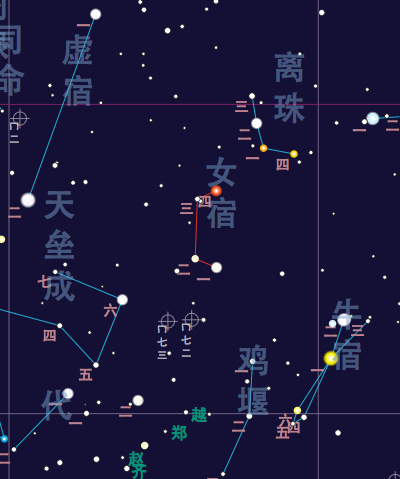
Nǚ Xiù map

The Girl mansion (女宿, pinyin: Nǚ Xiù) is one of the Twenty-eight mansions of the Chinese constellations. It is one of the northern mansions of the Black Tortoise.

== Asterisms ==
English name	Chinese name	European constellation	Number of stars	Representing
Girl	女	Aquarius	4	Women's matters, women weaving, the turtle or snake basaltic
Twelve States (Note: The Twelve States refer to these ancient states in the Spring and Autumn period and the Warring States period: Chu (楚), Dai (代), Han (韓), Jin (晉), Qi (齊), Qin (秦), Wei (魏), Yan (燕), Yue (越), Zhao (趙), Zheng (鄭), Zhou (周).)	十二國	Capricornus	16	Twelve states of Ancient China
Pearls on Ladies' Wear	離珠	Aquila/Aquarius	5	Women's social position and decorative beads
Rotten Gourd	敗瓜	Delphinus	5	Bad melon
Good Gourd	瓠瓜	Delphinus	5	One kind of green melon white
Celestial Ford (Note: The Celestial Ford refers to these stars: Gamma Cygni, Delta Cygni, 30 Cygni, Alpha Cygni, Nu Cygni, Tau Cygni, Upsilon Cygni, Zeta Cygni and Epsilon Cygni. Gamma Cygni is known as 天津一 (Tiān Jīn yī, English: the First Star of the Celestial Ford.).)	天津	Cygnus	9	Galaxy's ferry, a bridge across the Milky Way
Xi Zhong	奚仲	Cygnus	4	Xi Zhong was the inventor of chariots who lived during the Xia dynasty
Basket for Mulberry Leaves	扶筐	Draco	7	Mulberry leaf and equipment
