= Spring Triangle =

Pattern of stars in the Northern Hemisphere

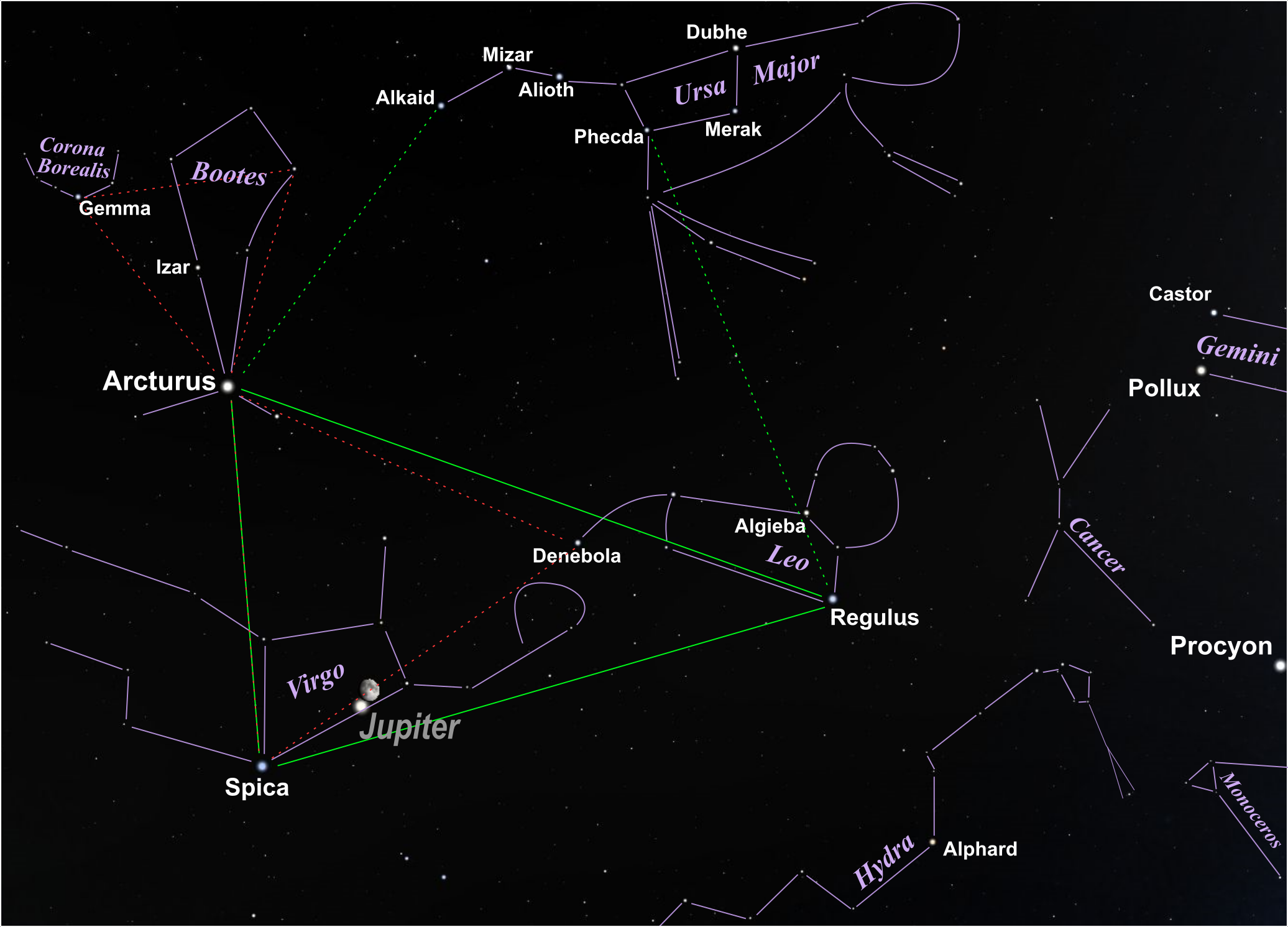
The Spring Triangle with Arcturus, Spica, Regulus, and Denebola

The Spring Triangle is an astronomical asterism involving an imaginary triangle drawn upon the celestial sphere, with its defining vertices at Arcturus, Spica, and Regulus. This triangle connects the constellations of Boötes, Virgo, and Leo. It is visible in the evening rising in the southeastern sky of the Northern Hemisphere between March and May and setting until August, while at morning rising and setting from November to the end of February.

George Lovi of Sky & Telescope magazine had a slightly different Spring Triangle, including the tail of Leo, with Denebola replacing Regulus. Although Denebola is dimmer, this triangle is more nearly equilateral. These stars, together with Cor Caroli, form parts of a larger spring asterism called the Great Diamond.

== The stars of the Spring Triangle ==
Constellation	Name	Apparent magnitude	Luminosity (L_{☉})	Spectral type	Distance (light years)
Boötes	Arcturus	−0.04	103.75	K1.5III	37
Virgo	Spica	1.04	1770	B1V + B4V	250
Leo	Regulus	1.35	134.28	B7V	79
Leo	Denebola	2.14	13.43	A3V	36

=== Arcturus (α Boötes) ===
Arcturus is a giant orange star in the constellation Boötes. Located only 37 light years away, it has an apparent magnitude of -0.04. It is the brightest star in the Northern Hemisphere and fourth brightest in the night sky.

Arcturus found in the constellation Boötes

Because it is spotted easily, Arcturus was identified by ancient humans and tied to mythological ideals. The star was given its name from the ancient Greek Ἀρκτοῦρος (Arktouros), which translates to "Guardian of the Bear." This name was selected because of the star's proximity to Ursa Major and Ursa Minor, surmising the two bear constellations were guarded by Arcturus.

Arcturus is thought to be around 6 to 8.5 billion years old, and has traveled up the red-giant branch of the Hertzsprung-Russell diagram as it has expanded in size. The star has a diameter of around 36 million km, making it about 26 times larger than the Sun. Despite this size difference, the mass of Arcturus is only 1.1 times that of the Sun.

With its high speed of 122 km/s (270,000 mph) and a path which crosses the galactic plane rather than residing within it, Arcturus may have formed outside of the Milky Way. The star is the namesake of a group of 52 other stars named the Arcturus moving group or Arcturus stream, all of which share a similar proper motion. It has been proposed that these stars are remnants of an ancient dwarf satellite galaxy that was assimilated into the Milky Way long ago.

=== Spica (α Virginis) ===
Spica is a binary blue-white star pair that appears as a single point of light from Earth, and is commonly if incorrectly referred to as a single star. The star system is 250 light years away and has an apparent magnitude of 1.04. It is the brightest star in the constellation Virgo, and is the 15th brightest star in the night sky. The name Spica is derived from a Latin phrase that describes the zodiac sign Virgo as holding an ear of grain, spīca virginis. Virgo the Maiden is often represented as a young woman holding this stalk of grain.

The best times of the year to view this star are during early spring to late summer in the Northern Hemisphere. To find this star easily, locate the Big Dipper and follow the curve of its handle. This curve will first lead to Arcturus. Finally, "drive a spike" directly to Spica.

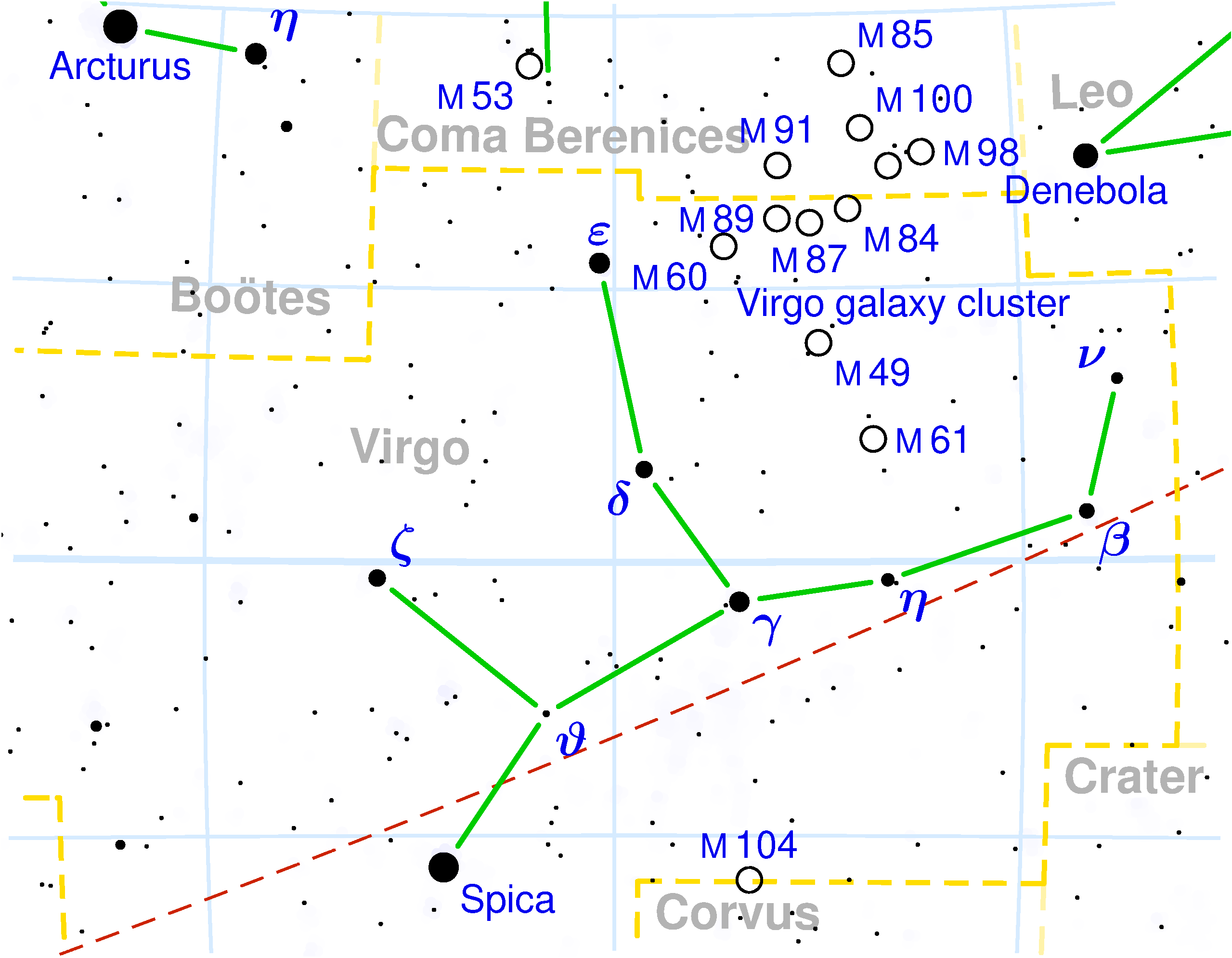
The constellation of Virgo

Spica is made up of two individual stars, Spica A and Spica B, with radii of 7.40 and 3.64 times the Sun's, respectively. Their sizes contribute greatly to the brightness of the stars. Spica A's luminosity is 12,100 times that of the Sun, while Spica B has a luminosity of 1,500. Their sizes lead to respective surface temperatures of 22,400 K and 18,500 K, much higher than the Sun. They are separated by a distance of only 0.12 AU with an orbital period of only four days. This proximity gravitationally distorts each star into an egg shape, with the pointed ends facing each other.

=== Regulus (α Leonis) ===
Regulus, the brightest object in the constellation Leo, is a quadruple star system made up of two separate pairs of stars. At 79 light years away and an apparent magnitude of 1.35, Regulus is the 21st brightest star in the sky. The name Regulus, which translates to "little king" in Latin, was given to the system by Polish astronomer Nicolaus Copernicus in the 16th century. The star can be seen at the base of the head of Leo that looks like a backwards question mark, which is also referred to as the Sickle.

The brighter pair of stars is called Regulus A, which is made up of a large visible bright blue star and its companion, Regulus D, which is possibly a white dwarf, though this is unconfirmed. This smaller companion has a mass of only 0.3 solar masses, while the mass of the larger is 3.8 solar masses. The pair are close at 0.35 AU apart, with a short orbital period of 40.11 days around a center mass. The other two stars are the main sequence orange dwarf Regulus B and its red dwarf companion Regulus C. With apparent magnitudes of 8.13 and 13.50, they can't be seen with naked eye. This means the entire system is named after its brightest star.

Regulus A appears egg-shaped due to an extreme rotational speed. While the Sun rotates on its axis once every 27 days at a speed of 7,242 kph (4,500 mph), Regulus rotates every 16 hours at 1.1 million kph (700,000 mph). Astronomers have determined that if the star rotated 10% faster it would rip itself apart.

=== Denebola (β Leonis) ===
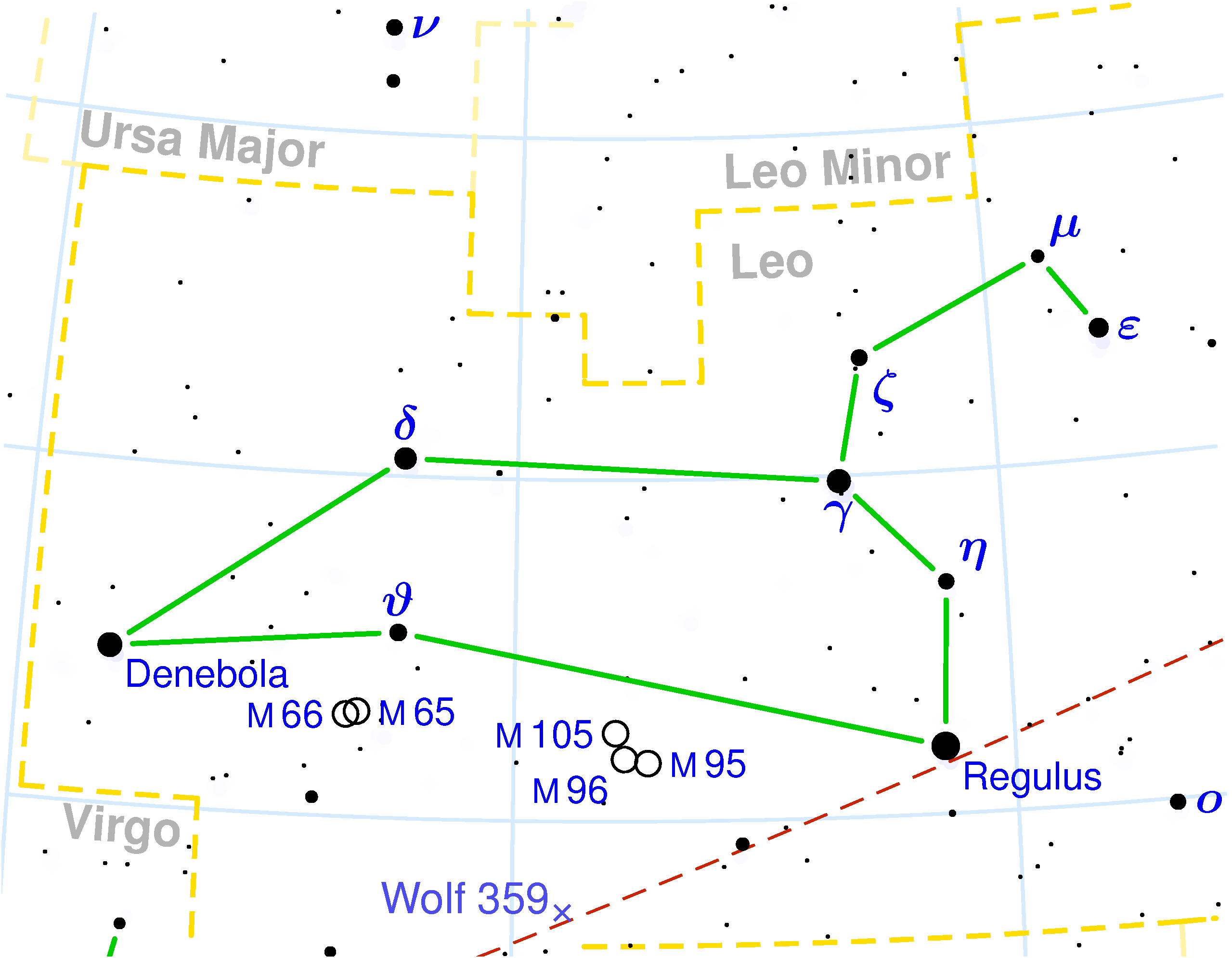
Positions of stars Denebola and Regulus in Leo

Denebola is a white main sequence star in the constellation Leo. With a distance of 36 light years from Earth, and an apparent magnitude of 2.14, it is the third brightest star in the constellation and the 62nd in the night sky. This star has often taken the place of Regulus in the Spring Triangle. While Regulus has a higher magnitude, Denebola makes the triangle more equilateral in appearance.

The star's name comes from the Arabic phrase Deneb Elased, or ðanab al-asad, meaning "the tail of the lion." This refers to the star's position in the constellation at the lion's tail end. Denebola has a mass of 1.78 solar masses and a radius of 1.728 solar radii, making it almost twice the size of the Sun. It may be a Delta Scuti type variable star due to its variations in brightness; about 10 times a day the star's brightness fluctuates in magnitudes around 0.025.

== Deep Sky Objects ==
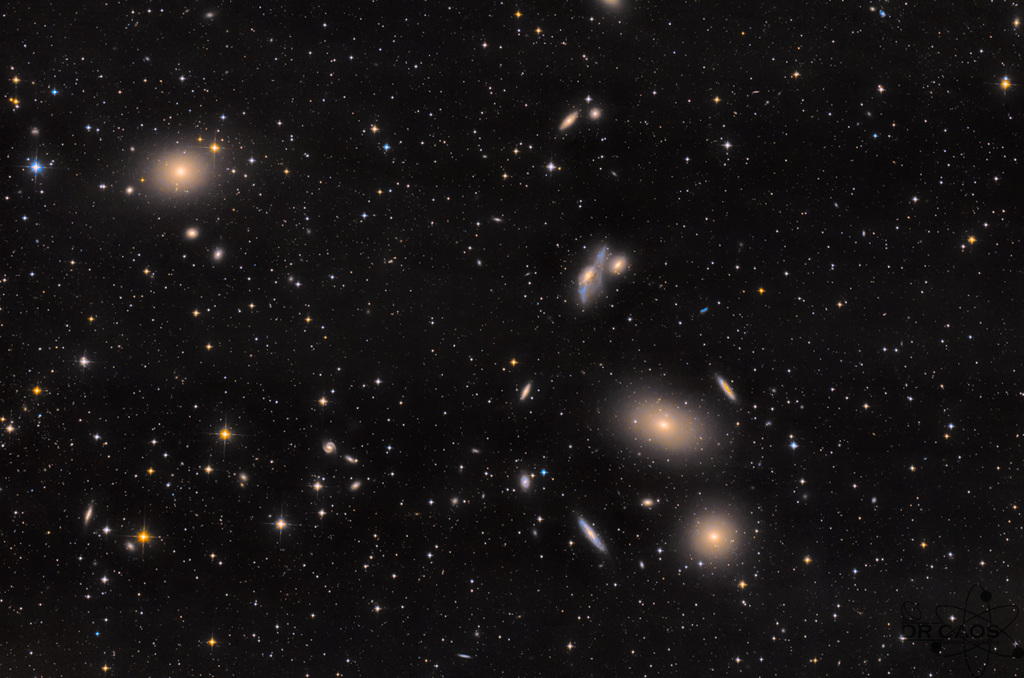
The Virgo Cluster

The Spring Triangle contains multiple objects of note, with a large amount of them belonging to the Virgo Cluster. This cluster contains around 1,500 galaxies and can be seen between the stars Denebola and Vindemiatrix, with many being notable Messier objects.

=== Messier 87 ===
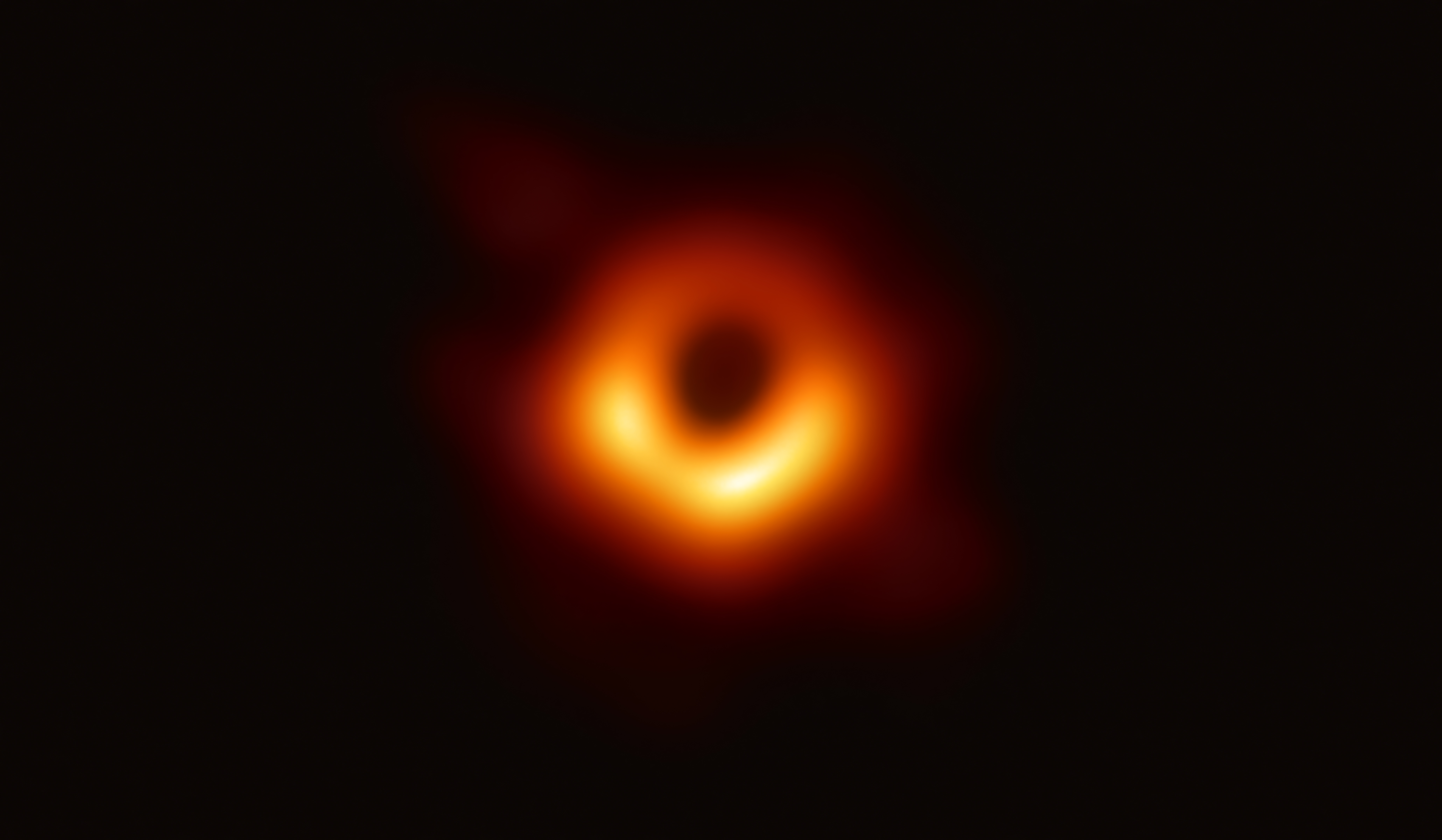
Supermassive black hole at the center of M87

The brightest galaxy seen in the cluster is the supergiant elliptical galaxy Messier 87. With an apparent magnitude of 9.6, the galaxy can be seen using a telescope, as it was first seen by Charles Messier in 1781. Located 54 million light years away and at 130,000 light years across, M87 houses several trillions of stars and around 15,000 globular star clusters. For comparison, the Milky Way is 105,700 light years across and contains around 200 billion stars.

At the center of this galaxy there is a supermassive black hole (of 6.5 billion solar masses) bearing a large blue jet of subatomic particles accelerated to speeds close to the speed of light. In 2019, an image of this black hole, designated M87*, was published by the Event Horizon Telescope collaboration -- the first picture of a black hole ever released.

=== Messier 49 ===
Messier 49 is the brightest galaxy in the Virgo group with an apparent magnitude of 9.4. This brightness allowed M49 to be the first observed in the group, by Nicolas Louis de Lacaille in 1752. The giant elliptical galaxy is located 56 million light years from Earth, and is around 157,000 light years across, with more than 200 billion stars.

=== Siamese Twins Galaxies (NGC 4567 and NGC 4568) ===
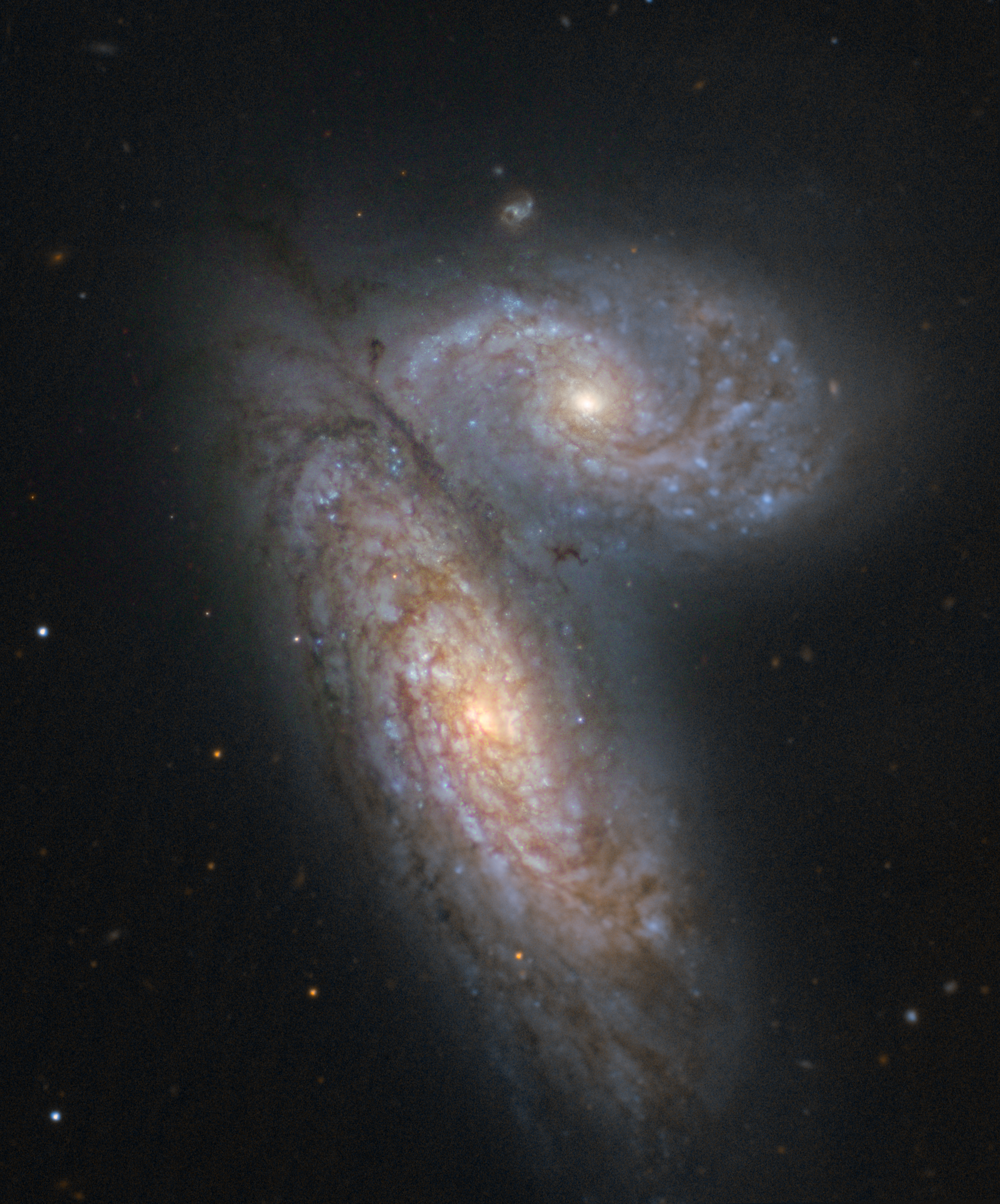
NGC 4567 and NGC 4568

Also known as the Butterfly Galaxies, NGC 4567 and 4586 are two unbarred spiral galaxies that are colliding. The pair were first discovered by astronomer William Herschel in 1784, but did not earn their name until observer Ralph Copeland called them the Siamese Twins in the late 1800s due to their almost identical shape and structure. The galaxies are located around 52 million light years away, with a separation between the cores of around 20,000 light years. The more distant galaxy, NGC 4567, has an apparent magnitude of 11.5 and is oriented almost completely face-on with our galaxy. The closer galaxy, NGC 4568, has an apparent magnitude of 11.2 and is oriented at a diagonal. It was originally believed that the two were simply passing directly behind each other in the same line of sight, but further observations and studies have observed a high rate of star formation where the galaxies overlap, confirming that they are undergoing the early phases of collision and merging.

=== Other objects ===
There are many other notable members in the triangle, including Messier 60, Messier 84, and Messier 86. Two named groups of galaxies are the Eyes Galaxies (NGC 4435 and NGC 4438) and the Leo Triplet (NGC 3628, Messier 65, Messier 66).

== See also ==
- Summer Triangle
- Winter Triangle
- Northern Cross
