= Northern Cross (asterism) =

Asterism

Northern Cross, shown in bold green

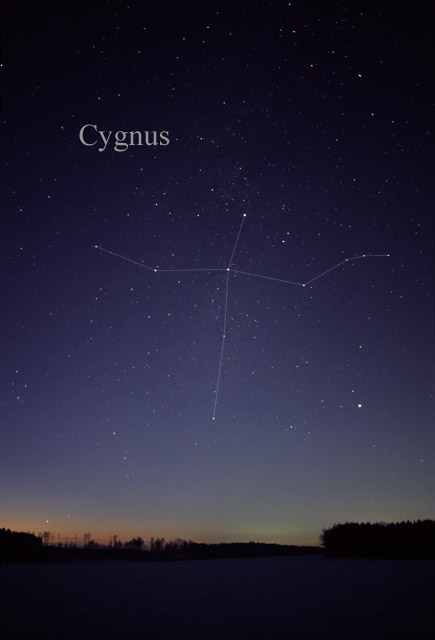
The constellation Cygnus. Sadr, the star in the center, and the four stars on its vertical and horizontal axes form the Northern Cross.

The Northern Cross is an astronomical asterism in the northern hemisphere of the celestial sphere, corresponding closely with the constellation Cygnus the swan. It is much larger than the Southern Cross and consists of the brightest stars in Cygnus: Deneb, Sadr, Epsilon Cygni (Aljanah, historically Gienah), Delta Cygni (Fawaris) and Albireo. The 'head' of the cross, Deneb, is also part of the Summer Triangle asterism.

Like the Summer Triangle, the Northern Cross is an indicator of the seasons. Near midnight, the Cross lies virtually overhead at mid-northern latitudes during the summer months; it can also be seen during spring in the early morning to the East. In autumn the cross is visible in the evening to the West until November. It never dips below the horizon at or above 45° north latitude, just grazing the northern horizon at its lowest point at such locations as Minneapolis, Montréal and Turin. From the Southern Hemisphere it appears upside down and low in the sky during the winter months.

In his Sixth Century guide to using the stars for monastic timekeeping, Bishop Gregory of Tours described a constellation which he called the Greater Cross, which can be identified with stars of the constellation Cygnus. Below the cross he placed lesser constellations which he called Alpha and Omega, which can be identified with part of Delphinus and Lyra. This reflects early medieval iconography, in which a cross is depicted with the letters Alpha and Omega below the arms of the cross.

In Johann Bayer's 17th-century star atlas, the Uranometria, it was suggested that Alpha, Beta and Gamma Cygni formed the pole of the Christian Cross, while Delta and Epsilon formed the cross beam. The variable star P Cygni was then considered to be the body of Christ.

== Member stars ==
Name	Bayer designation	Apparent magnitude	Luminosity (× solar)	Spectral type	Distance (light years)
Deneb	α Cygni	1.25	200,000	A2	2615 ± 215
Albireo	β Cygni	3	1,200	K2II	430
Sadr	γ Cygni	2.23	33,000	F8 Iab	1600
Fawaris	δ Cygni	2.87	76	B9 III + F1 V	170
Aljanah	ε Cygni	2.48	52	K0III-IV	72

== See also ==
- Big Dipper
- Crux
- Great Diamond
- Heavenly Market enclosure
- Winter Hexagon
- Winter Triangle
