= Sadir =

Sadir or Sadeer may refer to:

- Salih Sadeer, Iraqi footballer
- 'Sadeer attam', the ancient name of Bharata Natyam, an Indian classical dance
- Sadir (or Gamma Cygni), a star in the northern constellation Cygnus
