= Summer Triangle =

Asterism

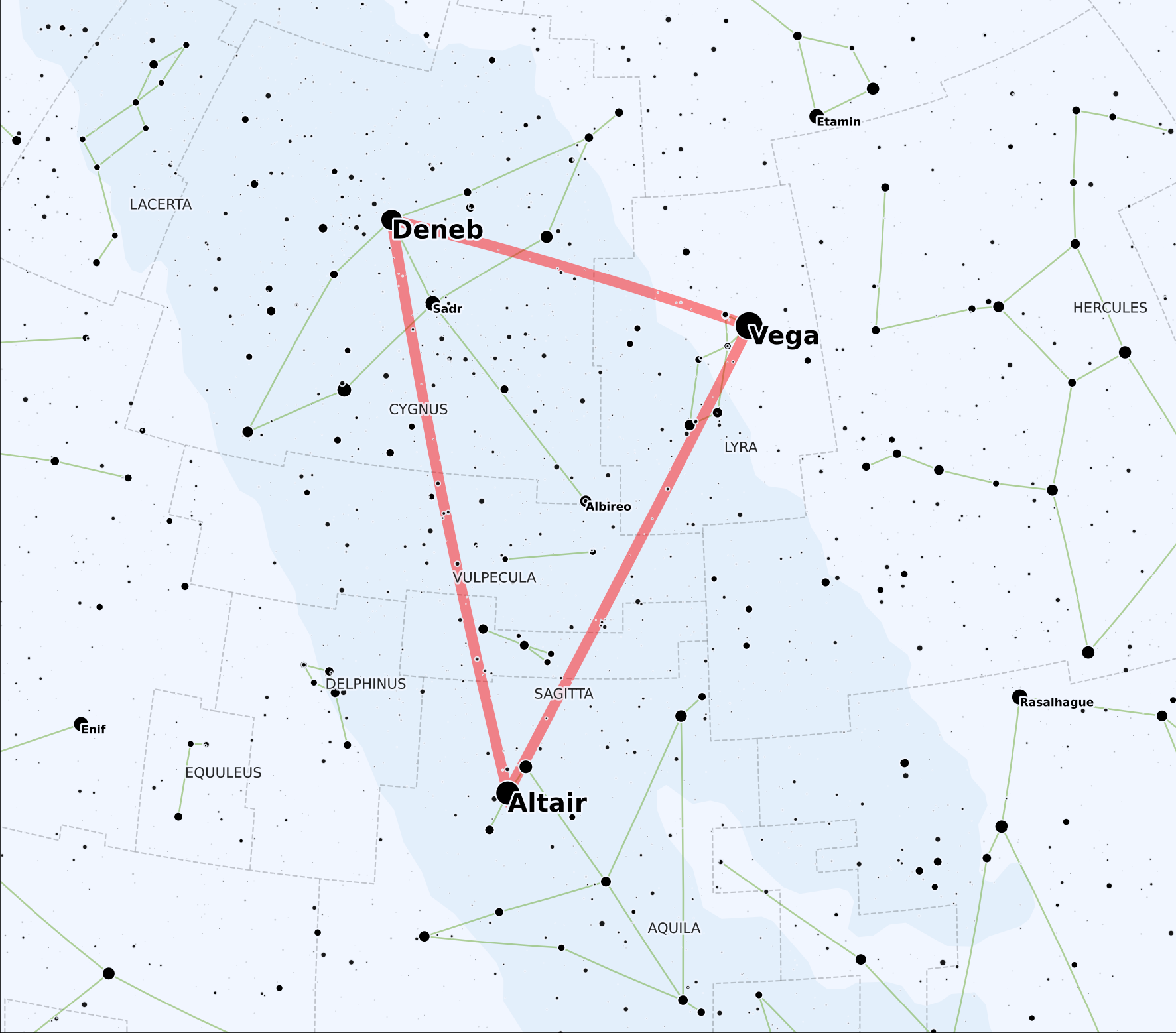
Map of the Summer Triangle

The Summer Triangle is an astronomical asterism in the northern celestial hemisphere. Its defining vertices form a triangle and are Altair, Deneb, and Vega, each the brightest star of its constellation (Aquila, Cygnus, and Lyra, respectively). The greatest declination is +45° and the lowest is +9°, meaning the three stars can be seen from all parts of the Northern Hemisphere and from much of the Southern Hemisphere. The stars in Aquila and Cygnus represent the head of an eagle and tail of a swan, respectively, which appear inscribed within the triangle and form its altitude of the triangle. Two small constellations, Sagitta and Vulpecula, lie between Aquila in the south of the triangle and Cygnus and Lyra to the north.

== History ==
The term was popularized by the American author H. A. Rey and the British astronomer Patrick Moore in the 1950s. The name can be found in constellation guidebooks as far back as 1913. The Austrian astronomer Oswald Thomas described these stars as Grosses Dreieck (Great Triangle) in the late 1920s and Sommerliches Dreieck (Summerly Triangle) in 1934. The asterism was remarked upon by Joseph Johann von Littrow, who described it as the "conspicuous triangle" in the text of his atlas (1866), and Johann Elert Bode connected the stars in a map in a book in 1816, although without a label. These are the same stars recognized in the Chinese legend of The Cowherd and the Weaver Girl, a story dating back some 2,600 years, celebrated in the Qixi Festival. The stars also bear ceremonial significance in the related celebrations of Tanabata, Chilseok, and Thất Tịch, derived from Qixi. In the mid- to late-20th century, before inertial navigation systems and other electronic and mechanical equipment took their places in military aircraft, the United States Air Force navigators referred to this asterism as the "Navigator's Triangle".

== Visibility ==
The Summer Triangle in the context of the night sky, with dimmer stars fading out first and then fading in last

From mid-to-tropical northern latitudes:

- the centre of the triangle appears about overhead around solar midnight during summer, and exactly so at about the 27th parallel north. This means it rises at sunset in the east and sets at sunrise in the west.
- it is visible in the eastern sky in early mornings during spring.
- In autumn and winter evenings, it is visible in the western sky until January.

From mid-southern latitudes, the asterism is in the north during the culmination season described above.

== The stars of the Summer Triangle ==
Both Altair and Vega are bluish-white, rapidly-rotating A-type main sequence stars in the local neighbourhood of the sun. However, Deneb is a white supergiant star over 100 times as distant, and one of the most luminous stars in the entire galaxy.

Name	Constellation	Apparent magnitude	Luminosity (L_{☉})	Spectral type	Distance (light years)	Radius (R_{☉})
Vega	Lyra	0.03	52	A0 V	25	2.36 to 2.82
Deneb	Cygnus	1.25	200,000	A2 Ia	2550	203 ± 17
Altair	Aquila	0.77	10	A7 V	16.6	1.63 to 2.03

== See also ==
- Northern Cross
- Spring Great Diamond
- Spring Triangle
- Winter Triangle
- Winter Hexagon
- Heavenly Market enclosure
