= Psi Cygni =

Star in the constellation Cygnus

- Location of ψ Cygni (circled in red)

Observation data Epoch J2000.0 Equinox J2000.0 (ICRS)
- Constellation: Cygnus
- Right ascension: 19^{h} 55^{m} 37.789^{s}
- Declination: +52° 26′ 20.180″
- Apparent magnitude (V): 4.91 (5.05 + 7.61)

Characteristics

A
- Spectral type: A4 Vn
- U−B color index: +0.05
- B−V color index: +0.124±0.006

B
- Spectral type: F4 V

Astrometry
| Radial velocity (R_{v}) | −10 km/s |
| Proper motion (μ) | RA: −37.044 mas/yr Dec.: −27.970 mas/yr |
| Parallax (π) | 11.5546±0.3168 mas |
| Distance | 282 ± 8 ly (87 ± 2 pc) |
| Absolute magnitude (M_{V}) | +0.23 |

Orbit
| Primary | Aa |
| Secondary | Ab |
| Period (P) | 54.08 yr |
| Semi-major axis (a) | 0.141″ |
| Eccentricity (e) | 0.484 |
| Inclination (i) | 112.0° |

Details

ψ Cyg Aa
| Luminosity | 62 L_{☉} |
| Temperature | 7,971 K |
| Rotational velocity (v sin i) | 207 km/s |

ψ Cyg B
| Rotational velocity (v sin i) | 120 km/s |

Other designations
- ψ Cyg, 24 Cygni, BD+52°2572, HD 189037, HIP 98055, HR 7619, SAO 32114, WDS 19556+5226

Database references
| SIMBAD | data |

Psi Cygni is a triple star system in the constellation of Cygnus. Its name is a Bayer designation that is Latinized from ψ Cygni and is abbreviated Psi Cyg or ψ Cyg. With a combined apparent visual magnitude of 4.92, it is visible to the naked eye as a point of light. Based upon an annual parallax shift of 11.55 mas, Psi Cygni is located at a distance of around 282 light years from the Sun.

As of 2002, the inner pair, components Aa and Ab, had an angular separation of 0.10 arc seconds along a position angle of 77.6°. Their combined visual magnitude is 5.05. Relative to this pair, the third member of the system, magnitude 7.61 component B, had an angular separation of 2.87 arc seconds along a position angle of 175.6° as of 2010.

The brighter member of the system, presumably component Aa, displays the spectrum of an A-type main sequence star with a stellar classification of A4 Vn, where the 'n' notation indicates "nebulous" absorption lines due to rapid rotation. It is spinning rapidly with a projected rotational velocity of 207 km/s. The component is radiating 62 times the solar luminosity from its outer atmosphere at an effective temperature of 7,971 K.

Component B has a spectral class of F4 V, matching an F-type main-sequence star. It is spinning with a high projected rotational velocity of 120 km/s.
