= Delta Cygni =

Third-magnitude star in the constellation Cygnus

- Location of δ Cygni (circled)

Observation data Epoch J2000 Equinox ICRS
- Constellation: Cygnus
- Right ascension: 19^{h} 44^{m} 58.47854^{s}
- Declination: +45° 07′ 50.9161″
- Apparent magnitude (V): 2.87

Characteristics
- Spectral type: A0 IV (B9 III + F1 V)
- U−B color index: −0.10
- B−V color index: −0.02
- Variable type: Suspected

Astrometry
| Radial velocity (R_{v}) | −20.1 km/s |
| Proper motion (μ) | RA: +44.07 mas/yr Dec.: +48.66 mas/yr |
| Parallax (π) | 19.77±0.48 mas |
| Distance | 165 ± 4 ly (51 ± 1 pc) |
| Absolute magnitude (M_{V}) | −0.74 |

Orbit
| Primary | A |
| Name | B |
| Period (P) | 780.27 yr |
| Semi-major axis (a) | 3.0″ |
| Eccentricity (e) | 0.4670 |

Details
| Mass | 2.93 M_{☉} |
| Radius | 4.81±0.36 R_{☉} |
| Luminosity | 155 L_{☉} |
| Surface gravity (log g) | 3.4±0.25 cgs |
| Temperature | 10400±400 K |
| Rotational velocity (v sin i) | 142 km/s |

Other designations
- Fawaris, δ Cyg, 18 Cygni, 18 Cyg, BD+44°3234, GC 27347, HD 186882, HIP 97165, HR 7528, SAO 48796, WDS J19450+4508AB

Database references
| SIMBAD | data |

Delta Cygni is a binary star system of a combined third-magnitude in the northern constellation of Cygnus. It is part of the Northern Cross asterism whose brightest star is Deneb. Its name is a Bayer designation that is Latinized from δ Cygni, and abbreviated Delta Cyg or δ Cyg. Based upon parallax measurements obtained during the Hipparcos mission, Delta Cygni is located roughly 165 light-years (51 parsecs) distant from the Sun.

Delta Cygni's two components are designated Delta Cygni A (officially named Fawaris /fəˈwɛərɪs/) and B. More widely separated is a faint third component, a 12th magnitude star that is moving along with the others. Together they form a triple star system.

== Nomenclature ==
δ Cygni (Latinised to Delta Cygni) is the binary's Bayer designation. The designations of the two components as Delta Cygni A and B derive from the convention used by the Washington Multiplicity Catalog (WMC) for multiple star systems, and adopted by the International Astronomical Union (IAU).

Traditionally, Delta Cygni had no proper name. It belonged to the Arabic asterism al-Fawāris (الفوارس), meaning "the Riders" in indigenous Arabic, together with Zeta, Epsilon, and Gamma Cygni, the transverse of the Northern Cross. In 2016, the IAU organized a Working Group on Star Names (WGSN) to catalog and standardize proper names for stars. The WGSN decided to attribute proper names to individual stars rather than entire multiple systems. It approved the name Fawaris for the component Delta Cygni A on 1 June 2018 and it is now so included in the List of IAU-approved Star Names.

In Chinese, 天津 (Tiān Jīn), meaning Celestial Ford, refers to an asterism consisting of Delta Cygni, Gamma Cygni, 30 Cygni, Alpha Cygni (Deneb) and Nu, Tau, Upsilon, Zeta and Epsilon Cygni. Consequently, the Chinese name for Delta Cygni itself is 天津二 (Tiān Jīn èr, English: the Second Star of Celestial Ford).

== Properties ==
The primary, Delta Cygni A, is a blue-white giant star of spectral class B9, with a temperature of 10,400 K. It is nearing the end of its main-sequence life stage with a luminosity 155 times that of the Sun, a radius of 4.81 solar radii, and a mass approximately 2.93 solar masses. Like many hot stars, it spins rapidly, at least 135 kilometers per second at the equator, about 60 times that of the Sun.

The close companion Delta Cygni B is a yellow-white F-type main-sequence star of the sixth magnitude (6.33) with a luminosity about 6 times that of the Sun, and a mass about 1.5 times the Sun's. The two stars orbit each other at an average distance of 157 AU and a period of 780 years.

The much more distant third companion is an orange (class K) twelfth magnitude star, and only two thirds as massive.

The two main stars together appear with a spectral type of A0 IV. As seen from Earth, the entire triple star system of Delta Cygni shines at a combined apparent magnitude of 2.87. Both δ Cygni A and B have been suspected to vary in brightness. δ Cygni A was reported in 1951 as varying between magnitudes 2.85 and 2.89, and δ Cygni B was reported in 1837 to vary between magnitudes 6.3 and 8.5. The variability of the stars has not been confirmed.

== Pole Star ==
Delta Cygni is a visible star located within 3° of the precessional path traced across the celestial sphere by the Earth's North pole. For at least four centuries around 11,250 AD it will probably be considered a pole star, a title currently held by Polaris which is just 0.5° off of the precessional path.

| Preceded by | Pole Star | Succeeded by |
|---|---|---|
| Deneb | ~11,000 AD to ~11,500 AD | Vega |
