= IC 1318 =

Nebula near the star Sadr

Emission nebula
- H II region
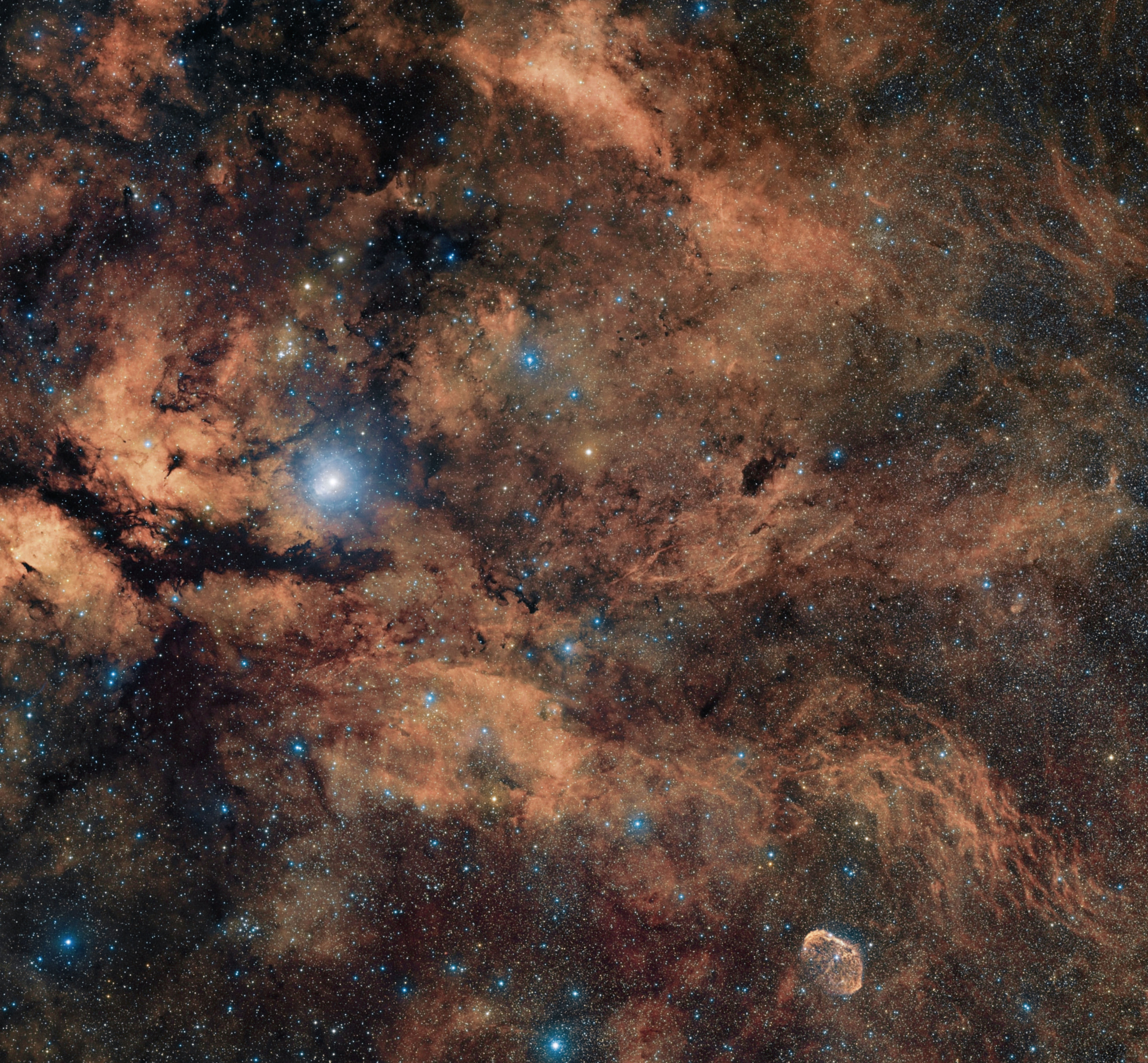
- Image of IC 1318 with Crescent Nebula in the lower right side and Gamma Cygni star in the upper left side as well as some other nebulous regions

Observation data: J2000 epoch
- Right ascension: 20^{h} 16^{m} 48.0^{s}
- Declination: +41° 57′ 24″
- Constellation: Cygnus
- Designations: IC 1318, Gamma Cyg Nebula, Sadr Region

IC 1318 (also known as Gamma Cygni Nebula) is the diffuse emission nebula and a H II region surrounding the star Sadr (γ Cygni) at the center of Cygnus's cross thus getting a nickname Sadr Region. The Sadr Region is one of the surrounding nebulous regions; others include the Butterfly Nebula and the Crescent Nebula. It contains many dark nebulae in addition to the emission diffuse nebulae.

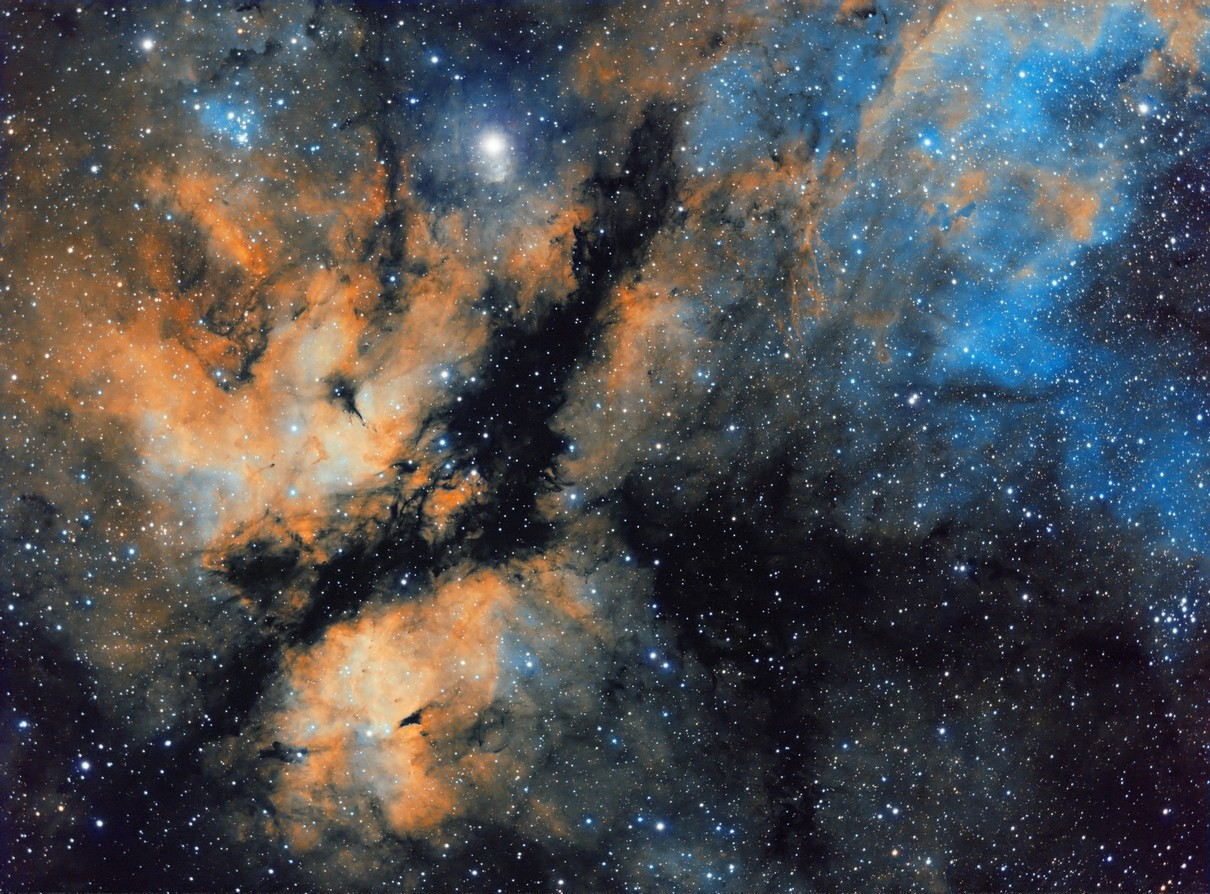
Butterfly Nebula in narrow band image SHO (north is approximately to the left)

== See also ==
- NGC 6910
