= Gamma Cygni =

Star in the constellation Cygnus

- Location of γ Cyg (circled)

Observation data Epoch J2000 Equinox ICRS
- Constellation: Cygnus
- Right ascension: 20^{h} 22^{m} 13.70184^{s}
- Declination: +40° 15′ 24.0450″
- Apparent magnitude (V): 2.23

Characteristics
- Spectral type: F8 Iab
- U−B color index: +0.54
- B−V color index: +0.67
- Variable type: suspected

Astrometry
Radial velocity (R_{v})	−7.5 km/s
Proper motion (μ)	RA: +2.39 mas/yr Dec.: −0.91 mas/yr
Parallax (π)	1.78±0.27 mas
Distance	approx. 1,800 ly (approx. 560 pc)
Absolute magnitude (M_{V})	−4.54

Details
Mass	14.5±1.1 M_{☉}
Radius	183 R_{☉}
Luminosity (bolometric)	33,023 L_{☉}
Surface gravity (log g)	1.02±0.10 cgs
Temperature	5,790±100 K
Metallicity [Fe/H]	+0.02 dex
Rotational velocity (v sin i)	15 km/s
Age	12 Myr

Other designations
- Sadr, Sadir, Sador, γ Cyg, 37 Cyg, BD+39°4159, FK5 765, HD 194093, HIP 100453, HR 7796, SAO 49528, WDS J20222+4015A

Database references
SIMBAD	data

Gamma Cygni is a star in the northern constellation of Cygnus, forming the intersection of an asterism of five stars called the Northern Cross. It is officially named Sadr /ˈsædər/; Gamma Cygni is its Bayer designation. Based upon parallax measurements obtained during the Hipparcos mission, it is approximately 1,800 light-years (560 parsecs) from the Sun.

It forms the primary or 'A' component of a multiple star system designated WDS J20222+4015 (the secondary or 'BCD' component is WDS J20222+4015BCD, a close triplet of stars 41" away from γ Cygni).

== Nomenclature ==
γ Cygni (Latinized to Gamma Cygni) is the star's Bayer designation, and is abbreviated Gamma Cyg or γ Cyg. WDS J20222+4015A is its designation in the Washington Double Star Catalog.

It bore the traditional name Sadr (also rendered Sadir /ˈseɪdər/ or Sador), derived from the Arabic صدر ṣadr "chest", the same word which gave rise to the star Schedar (Alpha Cassiopeiae). In 2016, the International Astronomical Union organized a Working Group on Star Names (WGSN) to catalogue and standardize proper names for stars. The WGSN decided to attribute proper names to individual stars rather than entire multiple systems. It approved the name Sadr for Gamma Cygni on 21 August 2016 and it is now so included in the List of IAU-approved Star Names.

In the catalogue of stars in the Calendarium of Al Achsasi al Mouakket, this star was designated Sadr al Dedjadjet, (صدر الدجاجة / ṣadr al-dajāja), which was translated into Latin as Pectus Gallinǣ, meaning the hen's chest.

In Chinese, 天津 (Tiān Jīn), meaning Celestial Ford, refers to an asterism consisting of Gamma Cygni, Delta Cygni, 30 Cygni, Alpha Cygni, Nu Cygni, Tau Cygni, Upsilon Cygni, Zeta Cygni and Epsilon Cygni. Consequently, the Chinese name for Gamma Cygni itself is 天津一 (Tiān Jīn yī, English: the First Star of Celestial Ford).

== Properties ==
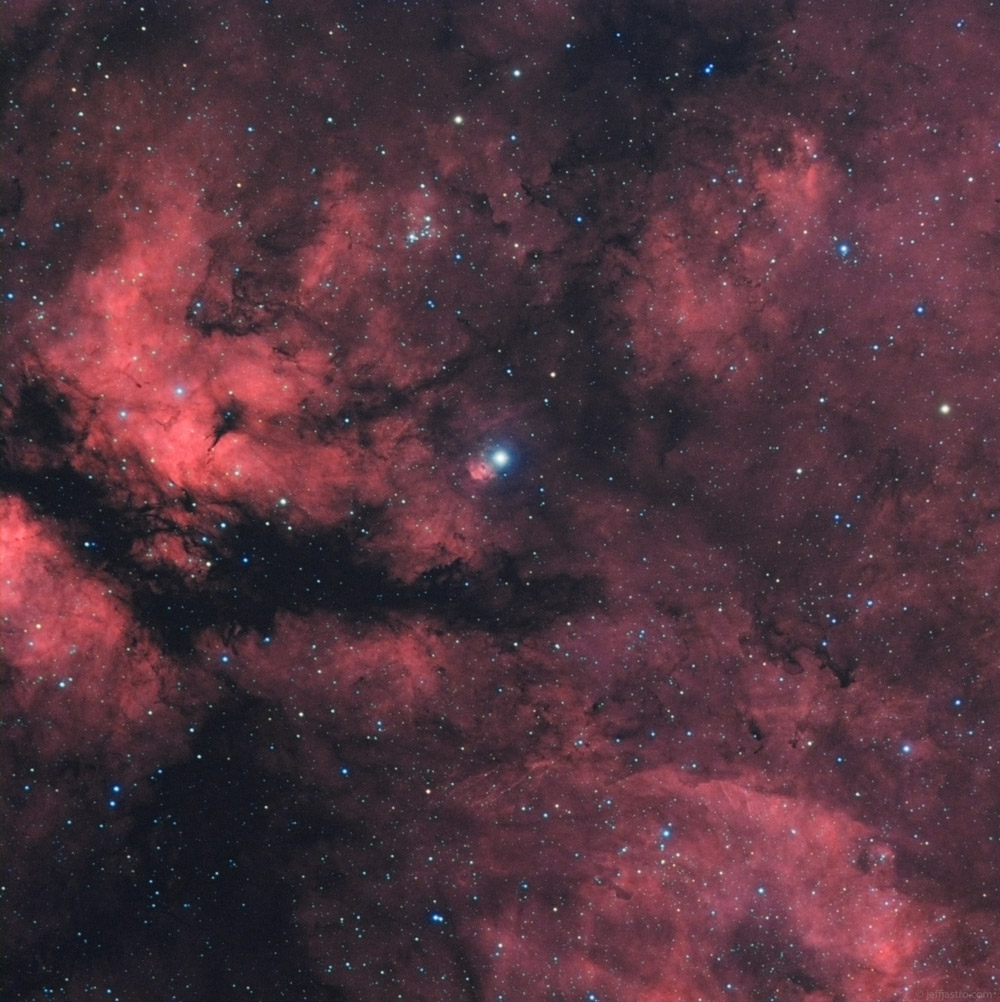
γ Cygni (center star) and surroundings. Image by Jeff Johnson.

With an apparent visual magnitude of 2.23, Gamma Cygni is among the brighter stars visible in the night sky. The stellar classification of this star is F8 Iab, indicating that it has reached the supergiant stage of its stellar evolution. Since 1943, the spectrum of this star has served as one of the stable anchor points by which other stars are classified.

Compared to the Sun this is an enormous star, with 14.5 times the Sun's mass and about 180 times the Sun's radius. It is emitting over 33,000 times as much energy as the Sun, at an effective temperature of 5,790 K in its outer envelope. This temperature is what gives the star the characteristic yellow-white hue of an F-type star. Massive stars such as this consume their nuclear fuel much more rapidly than the Sun, so the estimated age of this star is only about 12 million years old. Gamma Cygni has sufficient mass to explode as a supernova.

The spectrum of this star shows some unusual dynamic features, including variations in radial velocity of up to 2 km/s, occurring on a time scale of 100 days or more. Indeed, on the Hertzsprung–Russell diagram, Gamma Cygni lies close to the instability strip and its spectrum is markedly like that of a Cepheid variable. This star is surrounded by a diffuse nebula called IC 1318, or the Gamma Cygni region.
