= Winter Triangle =

Asterism

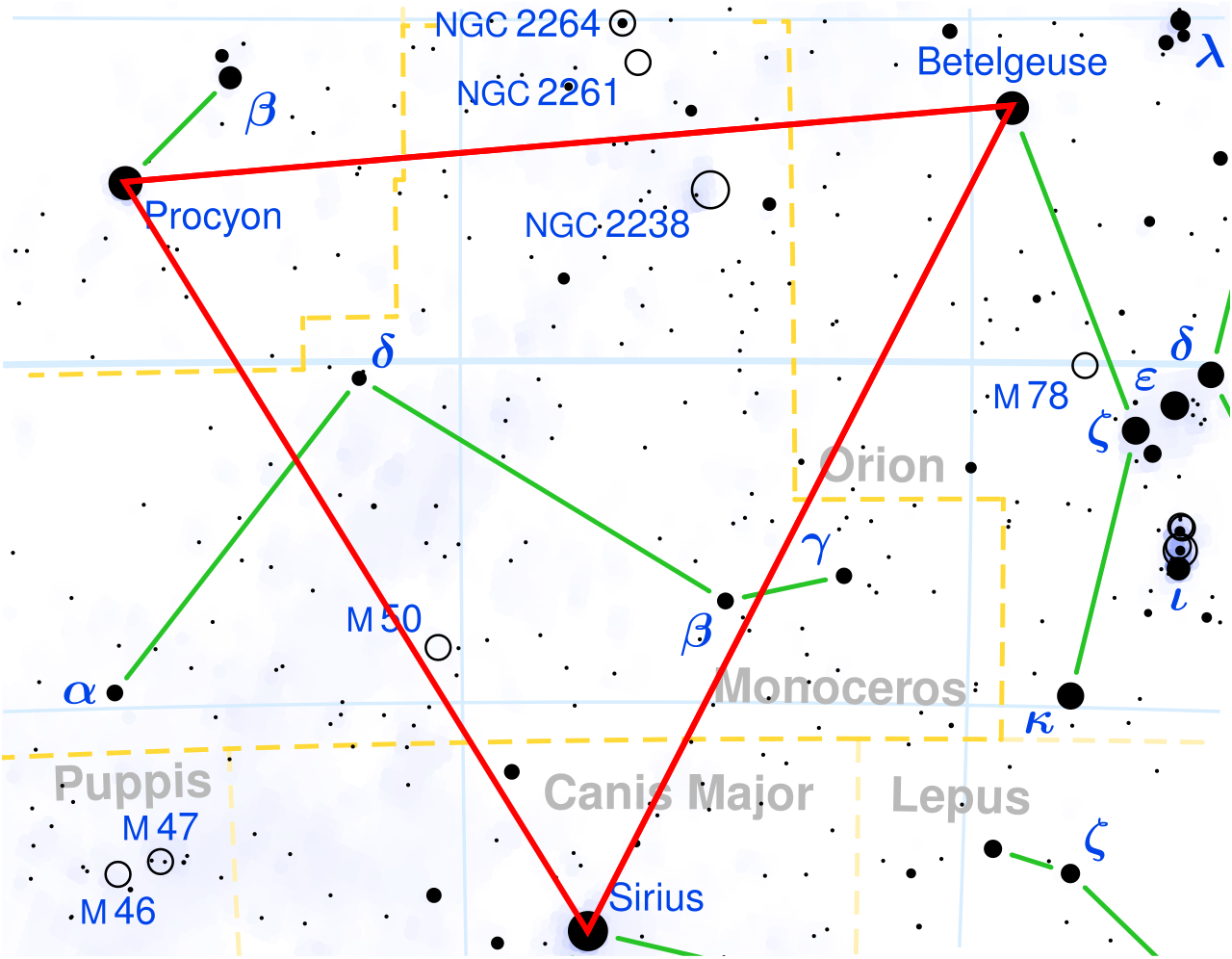
Winter Triangle

The Winter Triangle is an astronomical asterism formed from three of the brightest stars in the winter sky. It is an imaginary isosceles triangle (Note: Procyon-Sirius and Procyon-Betelgeuse are within 0.3° of one another but Sirius-Betelgeuse is significantly longer, so that the largest angle is 78.8°.) drawn on the celestial sphere, with its defining vertices at Sirius, Betelgeuse, and Procyon, the primary stars in the three constellations of Canis Major, Orion, and Canis Minor, respectively.

== Visibility ==
For much of the night in the northern winter, the Winter Triangle is high in the sky at mid-northern latitudes, but can also be seen during autumn in the early morning to the East. In the spring, the winter triangle is visible early in the evening to the West before its stars set below the horizon. From the Southern Hemisphere it appears upside down and lower in the sky during the summer months.

The Winter Triangle surrounds most of the faint constellation Monoceros, although its brightest stars are of fourth magnitude and hardly noticeable to the naked eye. The triangle includes two first magnitude stars, while Sirius is even brighter. Other bright stars of the winter sky around the triangle include Rigel in Orion, Aldebaran in Taurus, Castor and Pollux in Gemini, and Capella in Auriga.

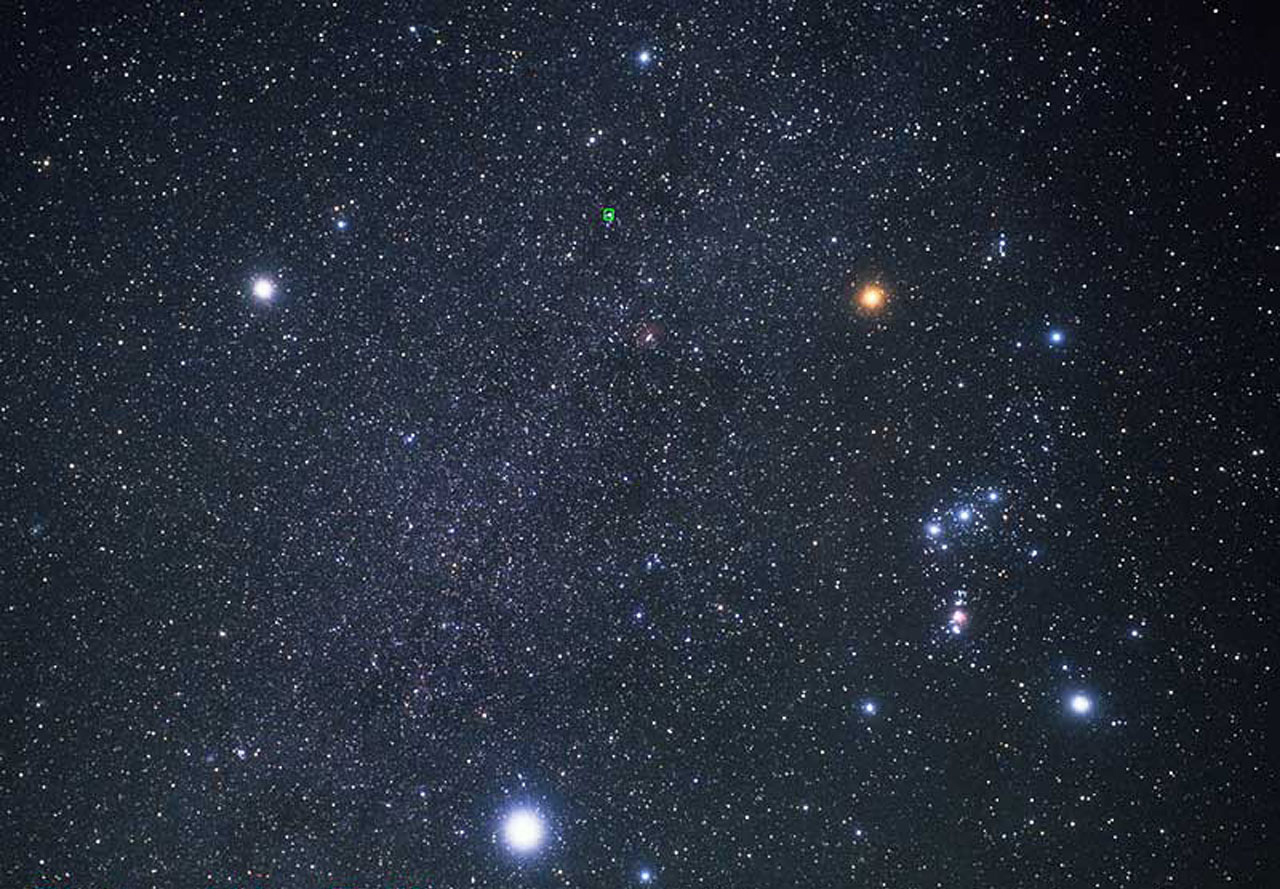
Winter Triangle stars

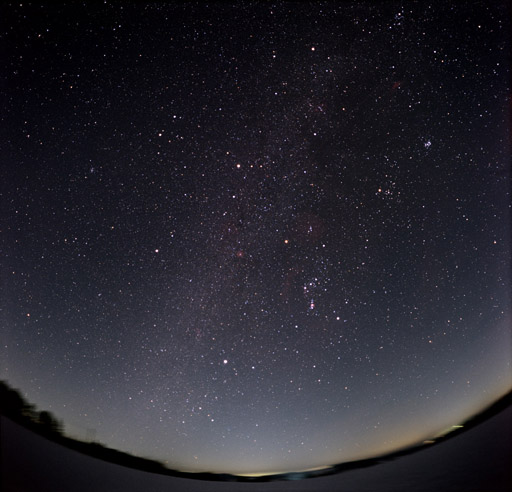
Wide view (forming a kite shape with Saturn above)

== Star data ==
Name	Constellation	Apparent magnitude	Luminosity (L_{☉})	Spectral type	Distance (ly)
Sirius	Canis Major	−1.46	25.4	A1 V	8.6
Betelgeuse	Orion	0.50	90,000 - 150,000	M2 Iab	640
Procyon	Canis Minor	0.34	6.93	F5 IV-V	11.5

== See also ==
- Northern Cross
- Great Diamond
- Summer Triangle
- Winter Hexagon
