= Epsilon Cygni =

Star in the constellation Cygnus

- Location of ε Cyg (circled)

Observation data Epoch J2000 Equinox ICRS
- Constellation: Cygnus
- Right ascension: 20^{h} 46^{m} 12.68236^{s}
- Declination: +33° 58′ 12.9250″
- Apparent magnitude (V): 2.480

Characteristics
- Evolutionary stage: Horizontal branch
- Spectral type: K0 III
- U−B color index: +0.860
- B−V color index: +1.030

Astrometry
Radial velocity (R_{v})	−12.41 km/s
Proper motion (μ)	RA: 355.66 mas/yr Dec.: 330.60 mas/yr
Parallax (π)	44.86±0.12 mas
Distance	72.7 ± 0.2 ly (22.29 ± 0.06 pc)
Absolute magnitude (M_{V})	+0.74 ± 0.02

Orbit
Primary	ε Cyg Aa
Name	ε Cyg Ab
Period (P)	53.693+0.321 −0.328 yr
Semi-major axis (a)	15.8±0.2 AU
Eccentricity (e)	0.9295±0.0003
Argument of periastron (ω) (primary)	275.30±0.06°
Semi-amplitude (K_{1}) (primary)	4.6 km/s

Details

A
Mass	1.103±0.042 M_{☉}
Radius	11.13 R_{☉}
Luminosity	56.4±0.6 L_{☉}
Surface gravity (log g)	2.79±0.23 cgs
Temperature	4,699 K
Metallicity [Fe/H]	−0.126 dex
Rotation	1.52 years
Rotational velocity (v sin i)	1.0±0.2 km/s
Age	9.62±0.12 Gyr

B
Mass	≥0.265±0.007 M_{☉}

Other designations
- Aljanah, Gienah, ε Cyg, 53 Cygni, BD+33°4018, FK5 780, GJ 806.1, GJ 9707, HD 197989, HIP 102488, HR 7949, SAO 70474, WDS 20462+3358, LHS 5358

Database references
SIMBAD	data

Epsilon Cygni is a binary star system in the constellation of Cygnus. Its name is a Bayer designation. With an apparent visual magnitude of 2.48, it is readily visible to the naked eye at night, and is the third-brightest star in the constellation. Based upon parallax measurement, Epsilon Cygni is about 73 light-years distant.

The system has two confirmed constituents, Epsilon Cygni Aa (officially named Aljanah /ˈældʒənə/) and Ab. Additionally, a visual companion (Epsilon Cygni C) is likely bound to the system.

== Nomenclature ==
ε Cygni (Latinised to Epsilon Cygni) is the system's Bayer designation, abbreviated Epsilon Cyg, ε Cyg. The designations of the three constituents as Epsilon Cygni A, B and C, and those of A's components - Epsilon Cygni Aa and Ab - derive from the convention used by the Washington Multiplicity Catalog (WMC) for multiple star systems, and adopted by the International Astronomical Union (IAU).

Epsilon Cygni bore the traditional name Gienah from the Arabic al janāħ (Arabic: جناح) meaning "the wing". However that name was more usually applied to Gamma Corvi. For reasons of disambiguation it was sometimes called Gienah Cygni. In 2016, the IAU organized a Working Group on Star Names (WGSN) to catalog and standardize proper names for stars. The WGSN decided to attribute proper names to individual stars rather than entire multiple systems. It approved the name Aljanah for the component Epsilon Cygni Aa on 30 June 2017. It had previously approved the name Gienah for Gamma Corvi A on 6 November 2016. Both are now so included in the List of IAU-approved Star Names.

In Chinese astronomy, the "Celestial Ford" (Chinese: 天津; pinyin: Tiān Jīn) refers to an asterism consisting of Epsilon Cygni, Gamma Cygni, Delta Cygni, 30 Cygni, Alpha Cygni, Nu Cygni, Tau Cygni, Upsilon Cygni and Zeta Cygni. Consequently, the Chinese name for Epsilon Cygni is "the Ninth Star of Celestial Ford" (Chinese: 天津九; pinyin: Tiān Jīn jiǔ).

== Companions ==
Epsilon Cygni A has an optical companion, Epsilon Cygni B, with which it is not physically associated, and a 13th magnitude candidate common proper motion companion, Epsilon Cygni C, at an angular separation of 78 arcseconds. If the latter star is gravitationally bound to Epsilon Cygni A, then they are currently separated by 1,700 AU or more, and have an orbital period of at least 50,000 years.

== Properties ==
ε Cygni appears north of the Veil Nebula towards the bottom left

Epsilon Cygni A is a single-lined spectroscopic binary. The components take 53 years to complete an orbit and are in a highly eccentric orbit, which put their distances from 1.1 astronomical units in apoapsis to 30.5 astronomical units in periapsis. (Note: Calculated using semi-major axis of 15.8 AU and eccentricity of 0.93 via the equations SMA(1−e) for apoastron and SMA(1+e) for periastron.) Its main component is a giant star with a stellar classification of K0 III. This indicates that the star has left the main sequence and has begun the final stages in its stellar evolution. After passing through the red-giant branch stage, it underwent a helium flash event and is now a horizontal branch star generating energy through the thermonuclear fusion of helium at its core. The effective temperature of its photosphere is 4,700 K, giving an orange hue that is a characteristic of K-type stars. Being 10% more massive than the Sun and nine billion years old, it has 11 times the radius of the Sun and is about 56 times more luminous.

The secondary has never been observed directly, its existence was inferred solely on astronomical spectroscopy. Based on this data, it should have a mass of at least 0.265 M_{☉}.

Since 1943, the spectrum of Epsilon Cygni A has served as one of the stable anchor points by which other stars are classified.

== Veil Nebula ==
ε Cygni lies about three degrees north of the Veil Nebula, a probable ancient supernova remnant. The nebula is far more distant than the star.
