= Cygnus (constellation) =

Constellation in the northern celestial hemisphere

- Constellation
- List of stars in Cygnus
- Abbreviation: Cyg
- Genitive: Cygni
- Pronunciation: /ˈsɪɡnəs/ SIG-nəss, genitive /ˈsɪɡnaɪ/ SIG-nye
- Symbolism: the Swan or Northern Cross
- Right ascension: 20.62^{h}
- Declination: +42.03°
- Quadrant: NQ4
- Area: 804 sq. deg. (16th)
- Main stars: 9
- Bayer/Flamsteed stars: 84
- Stars brighter than 3.00^{m}: 4
- Stars within 10.00 pc (32.62 ly): 3
- Brightest star: Deneb (α Cyg) (1.25^{m})
- Nearest star: 61 Cyg
- Messier objects: 2
- Meteor showers: October Cygnids; Kappa Cygnids
- Bordering constellations: Cepheus; Draco; Lyra; Vulpecula; Pegasus; Lacerta
- Visible at latitudes between +90° and −30°. Best visible at 21:00 (9 p.m.) during the month of September.

Cygnus is a northern constellation on the plane of the Milky Way, deriving its name from the Latinized Greek word for "swan". Cygnus is one of the most recognizable constellations of the northern summer and autumn, and it features a prominent asterism known as the Northern Cross. Cygnus was among the 48 constellations listed by the 2nd-century astronomer Ptolemy, and it remains one of the 88 modern constellations.

Cygnus contains Deneb, one of the brightest stars in the night sky, as its "tail star" and one corner of the Summer Triangle. It also has some notable X-ray sources and the giant stellar association of Cygnus OB2. One of the stars of this association, NML Cygni, is one of the largest stars known. The constellation is also home to Cygnus X-1, a distant X-ray binary containing a supergiant and unseen massive companion that was the first object widely held to be a black hole. Many star systems in Cygnus have known planets as a result of the Kepler Mission observing one patch of the sky, an area around Cygnus.

Most of the east has part of the Hercules–Corona Borealis Great Wall in the deep sky, a giant galaxy filament that is the largest known structure in the observable universe, covering most of the northern sky.

== History and mythology ==
=== In Eastern and World astronomy ===
In Polynesia, Cygnus was often recognized as a separate constellation. In Tonga it was called Tuula-lupe, and in the Tuamotus it was called Fanui-tai. In New Zealand it was called Mara-tea, in the Society Islands it was called Pirae-tea or Taurua-i-te-haapa-raa-manu, and in the Tuamotus it was called Fanui-raro. Beta Cygni was named in New Zealand; it was likely called Whetu-kaupo. Gamma Cygni was called Fanui-runga in the Tuamotus.

Whilst being represented as a swan in the west, the constellation is known as ad-Dajājah in Arabic, meaning the hen. Cygnus's brightest star, known in the western world as deneb, gains its name from the Arabic name dhaneb, meaning "tail", from the phrase Dhanab ad-Dajājah or the tail of the hen.

=== In Western astronomy ===
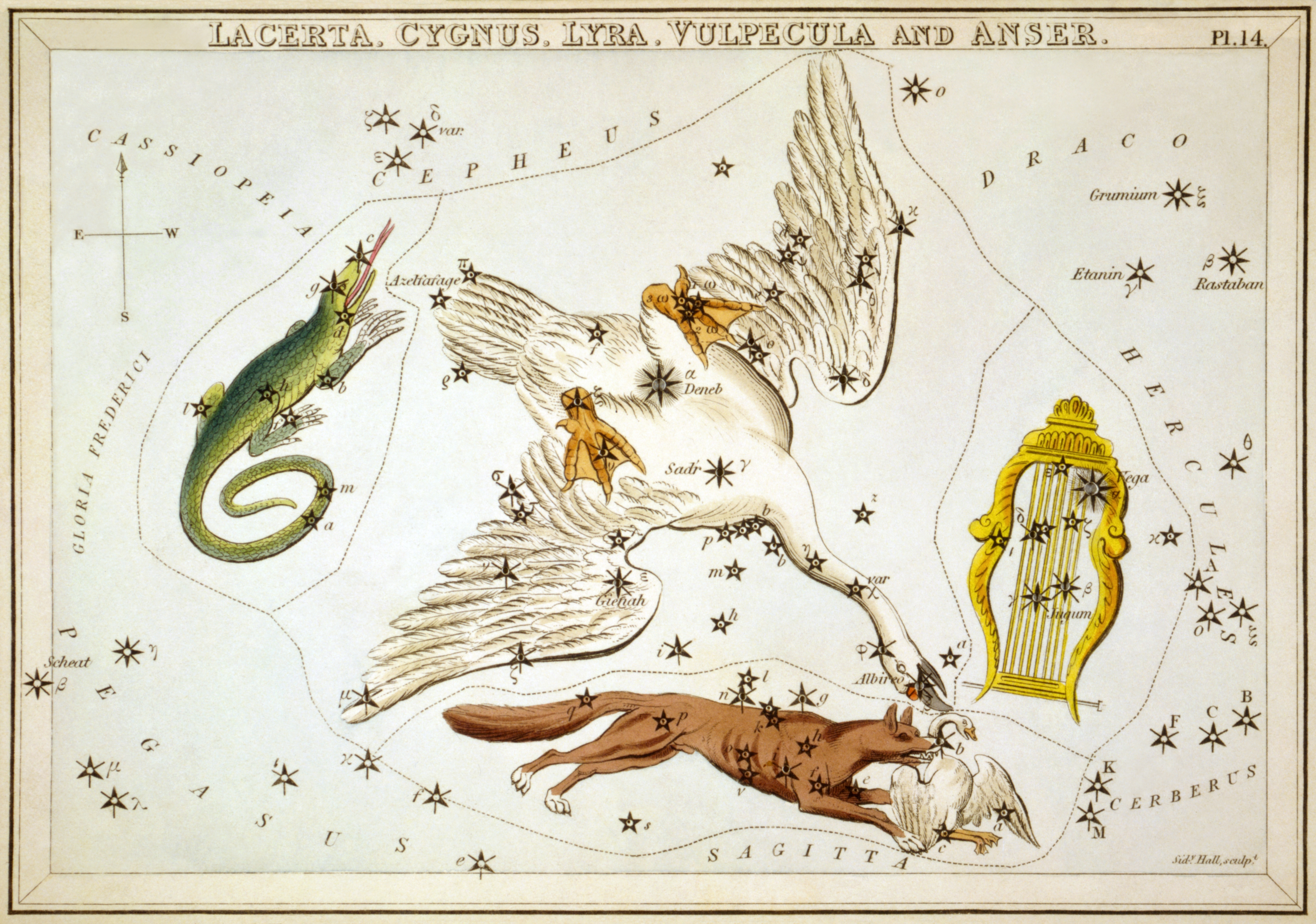
Cygnus as depicted in Urania's Mirror, a set of constellation cards published in London c.1825. Surrounding it are (from left) Lacerta, Vulpecula, and Lyra.

In Greek mythology, Cygnus has been identified with several different legendary swans. Zeus disguised himself as a swan to seduce Leda, Spartan king Tyndareus's wife, who gave birth to the Gemini, Helen of Troy, and Clytemnestra, and Orpheus was transformed into a swan after his murder and said to have been placed in the sky next to his lyre (Lyra).

Later Romans also associated this constellation with the tragic story of Phaethon, the son of Helios the sun god, who demanded to ride his father's sun chariot for a day. Phaethon, however, was unable to control the reins, forcing Zeus to destroy the chariot (and Phaethon) with a thunderbolt, causing it to plummet to the earth into the river Eridanus. According to the myth, Phaethon's close friend or lover, Cygnus of Liguria, grieved bitterly and spent many days diving into the river to collect Phaethon's bones to give him a proper burial. The gods were so touched by Cygnus's devotion that they turned him into a swan and placed him among the stars.

In Ovid's Metamorphoses, there are three people named Cygnus, all of whom are transformed into swans. Alongside Cygnus, noted above, he mentions a boy from Aetolia who throws himself off a cliff when his companion Phyllius refuses to give him a tamed bull that he demands, but he is transformed into a swan and flies away. He also mentions a son of Poseidon, an invulnerable warrior in the Trojan War who is eventually killed by Achilles, but Poseidon saves him by transforming him into a swan.

Together with other avian constellations near the summer solstice, Vultur cadens and Aquila, Cygnus may be a significant part of the origin of the myth of the Stymphalian Birds, one of The Twelve Labours of Hercules.

== Characteristics ==
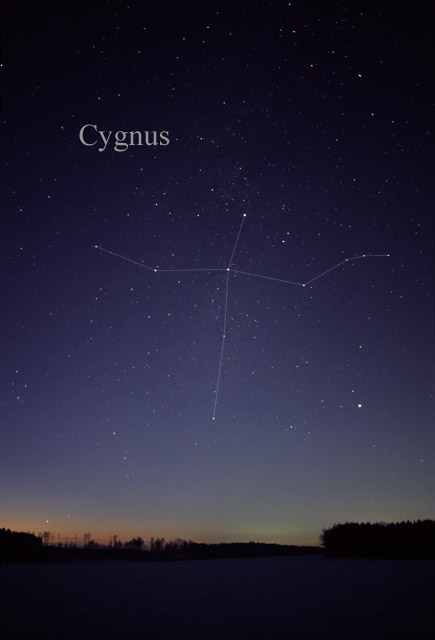
Cygnus in the night sky

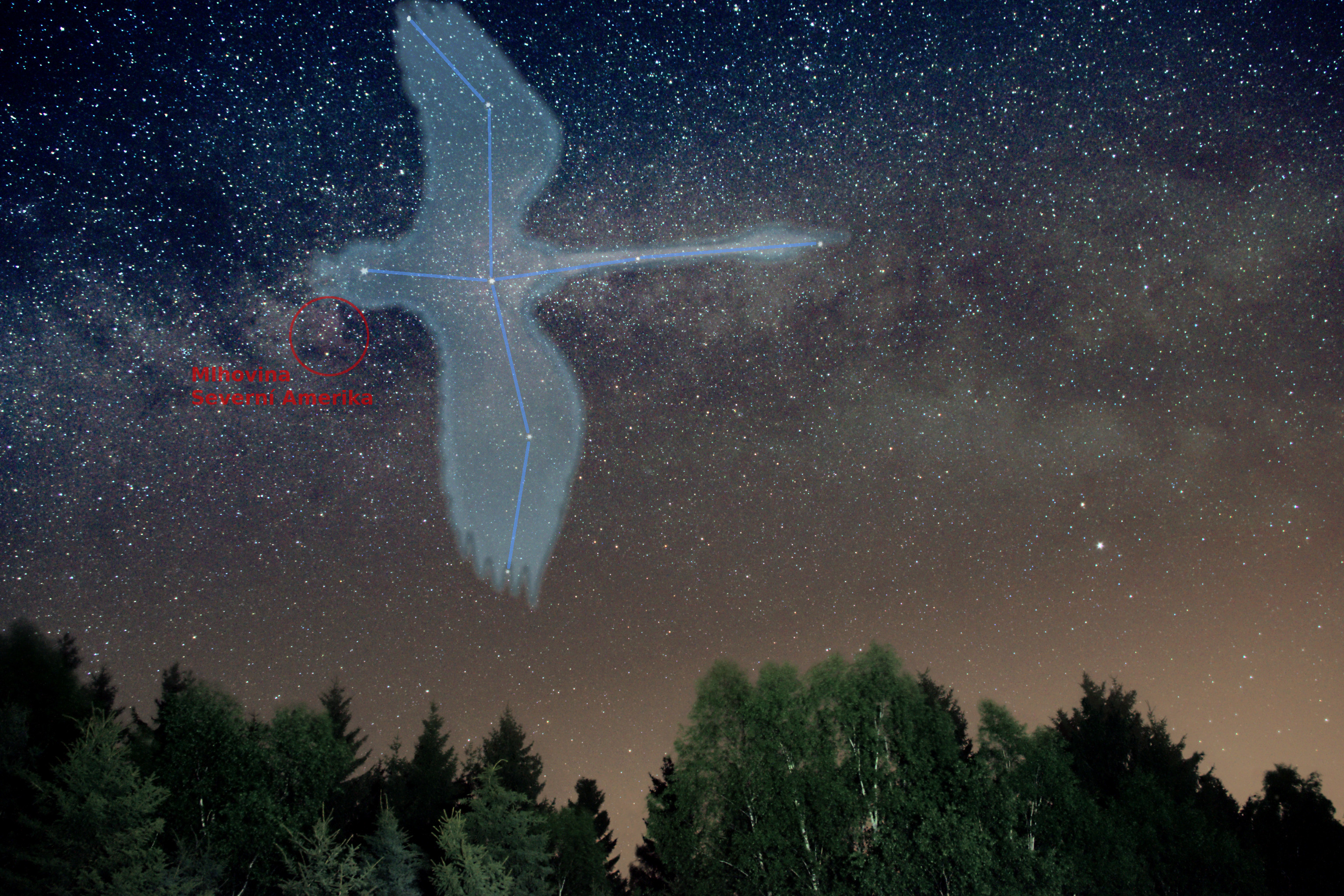
A swan superimposed over Cygnus

A very large constellation, Cygnus is bordered by Cepheus to the north and east, Draco to the north and west, Lyra to the west, Vulpecula to the south, Pegasus to the southeast and Lacerta to the east. The three-letter abbreviation for the constellation, as adopted by the IAU in 1922, is "Cyg". The official constellation boundaries, as set by Belgian astronomer Eugène Delporte in 1930, are defined as a polygon of 28 segments. In the equatorial coordinate system, the right ascension coordinates of these borders lie between 19^{h} 07.3^{m} and 22^{h} 02.3^{m} , while the declination coordinates are between 27.73° and 61.36°. Covering 804 square degrees and around 1.9% of the night sky, Cygnus ranks 16th of the 88 constellations in size.

Cygnus culminates at midnight on 29 June, and is most visible in the evening from the early summer to mid-autumn in the Northern Hemisphere.

Normally, Cygnus is depicted with Delta and Epsilon Cygni as its wings. Deneb (ذنب, translit. ḏanab, tail), the brightest in the constellation, is at its tail, with Albireo at the tip of its beak. Deneb, one corner of the Summer Triangle, is also one of the brightest stars in the night sky and the most distant first-magnitude star.

There are several asterisms in Cygnus. In the 17th-century German celestial cartographer Johann Bayer's star atlas the Uranometria, Alpha, Beta and Gamma Cygni form the pole of a cross, while Delta and Epsilon form the cross beam. The nova P Cygni was then considered to be the body of Christ.

== Features ==
There is an abundance of deep-sky objects, with many open clusters, nebulae of various types and supernova remnants found in Cygnus due to its position on the Milky Way.

Its molecular clouds form the Cygnus Rift dark nebula constellation, comprising one end of the Great Rift along the Milky Way's galactic plane. The rift begins around the Northern Coalsack, and partially obscures the larger Cygnus molecular cloud complex behind it, which the North America Nebula is part of.

=== Stars ===
Bayer catalogued many stars in the constellation, giving them the Bayer designations from Alpha to Omega and then using lowercase Roman letters to g. John Flamsteed added the Roman letters h, i, k, l and m (these stars were considered informes by Bayer as they lay outside the asterism of Cygnus), but were dropped by Francis Baily.

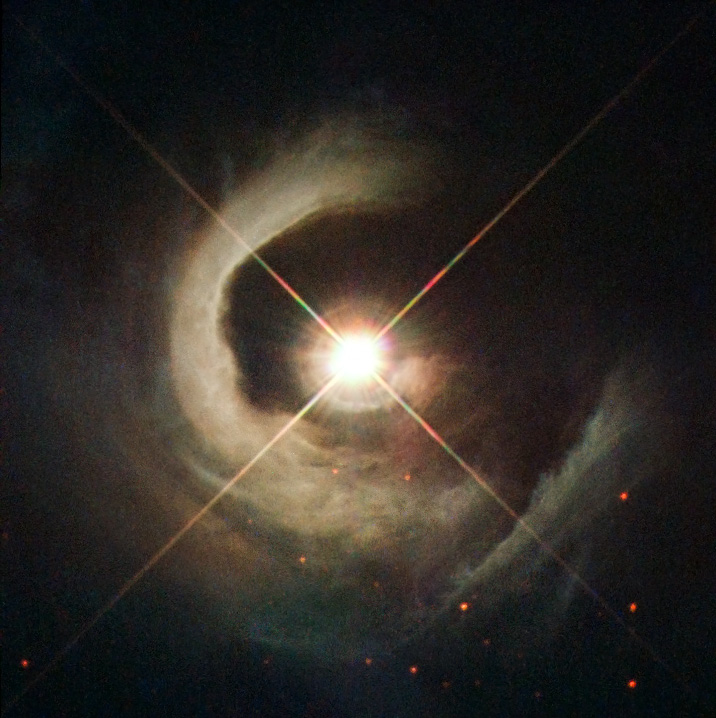
V1331 Cygni is located in the dark cloud LDN 981.

There are several bright stars in Cygnus. α Cygni, called Deneb, is the brightest star in Cygnus. It is a white supergiant star of spectral type A2Iae that varies between magnitudes 1.21 and 1.29, one of the largest and most luminous A-class stars known. It is located about 2600 light-years away. Its traditional name means "tail" and refers to its position in the constellation. Albireo, designated β Cygni, is a celebrated binary star among amateur astronomers for its contrasting hues. The primary is an orange-hued giant star of magnitude 3.1 and the secondary is a blue-green hued star of magnitude 5.1. The system is 430 light-years away and is visible in large binoculars and all amateur telescopes. γ Cygni, traditionally named Sadr, is a yellow-tinged supergiant star of magnitude 2.2, 1800 light-years away. Its traditional name means "breast" and refers to its position in the constellation. δ Cygni (properly named Fawaris) is another bright binary star in Cygnus, 166 light-years with a period of 800 years. The primary is a blue-white hued giant star of magnitude 2.9, and the secondary is a star of magnitude 6.6. The two components are visible in a medium-sized amateur telescope. The fifth star in Cygnus above magnitude 3 is Aljanah, designated ε Cygni. It is an orange-hued giant star of magnitude 2.5, 72 light-years from Earth.

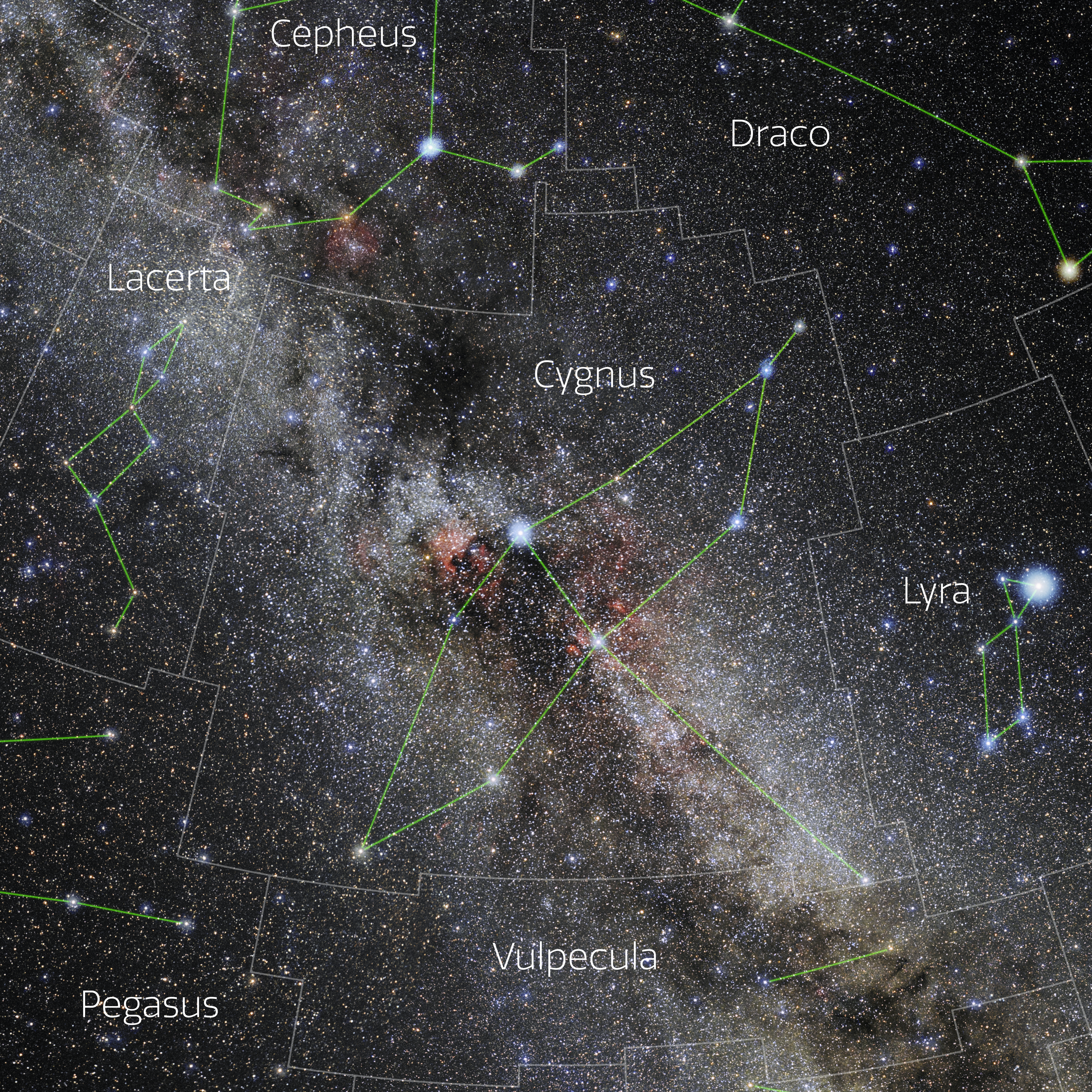
Cygnus showing the IAU boundaries and labels for its brightest stars. Astrophotograph by Eckhard Slawik, from NOIRLab's 88 Constellations project.

There are several other dimmer double and binary stars in Cygnus. μ Cygni is a binary star with an optical tertiary component. The binary system has a period of 790 years and is 73 light-years from Earth. The primary and secondary, both white stars, are of magnitude 4.8 and 6.2, respectively. The unrelated tertiary component is of magnitude 6.9. Though the tertiary component is visible in binoculars, the primary and secondary currently require a medium-sized amateur telescope to split, as they will through the year 2020. The two stars will be closest between 2043 and 2050, when they will require a telescope with larger aperture to split. The stars 30 and 31 Cygni form a contrasting double star similar to the brighter Albireo. The two are visible in binoculars. The primary, 31 Cygni, is an orange-hued star of magnitude 3.8, 1400 light-years from Earth. The secondary, 30 Cygni, appears blue-green. It is of spectral type A5IIIn and magnitude 4.83, and is around 610 light-years from Earth. 31 Cygni itself is a binary star; the tertiary component is a blue star of magnitude 7.0. ψ Cygni is a binary star visible in small amateur telescopes, with two white components. The primary is of magnitude 5.0 and the secondary is of magnitude 7.5. 61 Cygni is a binary star visible in large binoculars or a small amateur telescope. It is 11.4 light-years from Earth and has a period of 750 years. Both components are orange-hued dwarf (main sequence) stars; the primary is of magnitude 5.2 and the secondary is of magnitude 6.1. 61 Cygni is significant because Friedrich Wilhelm Bessel determined its parallax in 1838, the first star to have a known parallax.

Located near η Cygni is the X-ray source Cygnus X-1, which is now thought to be caused by a black hole accreting matter in a binary star system. This was the first X-ray source widely believed to be a black hole. It is located approximately 2.2 kiloparsecs from the Sun. There is also a supergiant variable star in the system which is known as HDE 226868.

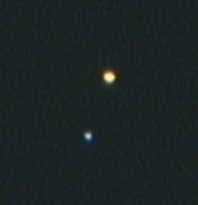
The two component stars of Albireo are easily distinguished, even in a small telescope.

Cygnus also contains several other noteworthy X-ray sources. Cygnus X-3 is a microquasar containing a Wolf–Rayet star in orbit around a very compact object, with a period of only 4.8 hours. The system is one of the most intrinsically luminous X-ray sources observed. The system undergoes periodic outbursts of unknown nature, and during one such outburst, the system was found to be emitting muons, likely caused by neutrinos. While the compact object is thought to be a neutron star or possibly a black hole, it is possible that the object is instead a more exotic stellar remnant, possibly the first discovered quark star, hypothesized due to its production of cosmic rays that cannot be explained if the object is a normal neutron star. The system also emits cosmic rays and gamma rays, and has helped shed insight on to the formation of such rays. Cygnus X-2 is another X-ray binary, containing an A-type giant in orbit around a neutron star with a 9.8-day period. The system is interesting due to the rather small mass of the companion star, as most millisecond pulsars have much more massive companions. Another black hole in Cygnus is V404 Cygni, which consists of a K-type star orbiting around a black hole of around 12 solar masses. The black hole, similar to that of Cygnus X-3, has been hypothesized to be a quark star. 4U 2129+ 47 is another X-ray binary containing a neutron star which undergoes outbursts, as is EXO 2030+ 375.

Cygnus is also home to several variable stars. SS Cygni is a dwarf nova which undergoes outbursts every 7–8 weeks. The system's total magnitude varies from 12th magnitude at its dimmest to 8th magnitude at its brightest. The two objects in the system are incredibly close together, with an orbital period of less than 0.28 days. χ Cygni is a red giant and the second-brightest Mira variable star at its maximum. It ranges between magnitudes 3.3 and 14.2, and spectral types S6,2e to S10,4e (MSe) over a period of 408 days; it has a diameter of 300 solar diameters and is 350 light-years from Earth. P Cygni is a luminous blue variable that brightened suddenly to 3rd magnitude in 1600 AD. Since 1715, the star has been of 5th magnitude, despite being more than 5000 light-years from Earth. The star's spectrum is unusual in that it contains very strong emission lines resulting from surrounding nebulosity. W Cygni is a semi-regular variable red giant star, 618 light-years from Earth.It has a maximum magnitude of 5.10 and a minimum magnitude 6.83; its period of 131 days. It is a red giant ranging between spectral types M4e-M6e(Tc:)III, NML Cygni is an extremely luminous OH/IR red hypergiant semi-regular variable star located at 5,300 light-years away from Earth. It is one of the most extreme and largest stars currently known in the galaxy, and is usually compared to another similar star, VY Canis Majoris, in terms of properties, with a radius exceeding at least that of the orbit of Jupiter. Its magnitude is around 16.6, its period is about 940 days.

The star KIC 8462852 (Tabby's Star) has received widespread press coverage because of unusual light fluctuations.

=== Exoplanets ===
Cygnus is one of the constellations that the Kepler satellite surveyed in its search for exoplanets, and as a result, there are about a hundred stars in Cygnus with known planets, the most of any constellation. One of the most notable systems is the Kepler-11 system, containing six transiting planets, all within a plane of approximately one degree. It was the first system with six exoplanets to be discovered. With a spectral type of G6V, the star is somewhat cooler than the Sun. All the planets are more massive than Earth, and all have low densities; and all but one are closer to Kepler-11 than Mercury is to the Sun. The naked-eye star 16 Cygni, a triple star approximately 70 light-years from Earth composed two Sun-like stars and a red dwarf, contains a planet orbiting one of the sun-like stars, found due to variations in the star's radial velocity. Gliese 777, another naked-eye multiple star system containing a yellow star and a red dwarf, also contains a planet. The planet is somewhat similar to Jupiter, but with slightly more mass and a more eccentric orbit. The Kepler-22 system is also notable for having the most Earth-like exoplanet when it was discovered in 2011.

=== Star clusters ===
The rich background of stars of Cygnus can make it difficult to make out open clusters.

M39 (NGC 7092) is an open cluster 950 light-years from Earth that is visible to the unaided eye under dark skies. It is loose, with about 30 stars arranged over a wide area; their conformation appears triangular. The brightest stars of M39 are of the 7th magnitude. M29 (NGC 6913) is an open cluster over 5000 light-years distant, just south of the central bright star Gamma Cygni. Another open cluster in Cygnus is NGC 6910, also called the Rocking Horse Cluster, possessing 16 stars with a diameter of 5 arcminutes visible in a small amateur instrument; it is of magnitude 7.4. The brightest of these are two gold-hued stars, which represent the bottom of the toy it is named for. A larger amateur instrument reveals 8 more stars, nebulosity to the east and west of the cluster, and a diameter of 9 arcminutes. The nebulosity in this region is part of the Gamma Cygni Nebula. The other stars, approximately 3700 light-years from Earth, are mostly blue-white and very hot.

Other open clusters in Cygnus include Dolidze 9, Collinder 421, Dolidze 11, and Berkeley 90. Dolidze 9, 2800 light-years from Earth and relatively young at 20 million years old, is a faint open cluster with up to 22 stars visible in small and medium-sized amateur telescopes. Nebulosity is visible to the north and east of the cluster, which is 7 arcminutes in diameter. The brightest star appears in the eastern part of the cluster and is of the 7th magnitude; another bright star has a yellow hue. Dolidze 11 is an open cluster 400 million years old, farthest away of the three at 3700 light-years. More than 10 stars are visible in an amateur instrument in this cluster, of similar size to Dolidze 9 at 7 arcminutes in diameter, whose brightest star is of magnitude 7.5. It, too, has nebulosity in the east. Collinder 421 is a particularly old open cluster at an age of approximately 1 billion years; it is of magnitude 10.1. 3100 light-years from Earth, more than 30 stars are visible in a diameter of 8 arcseconds. The prominent star in the north of the cluster has a golden color, whereas the stars in the south of the cluster appear orange. Collinder 421 appears to be embedded in nebulosity, which extends past the cluster's borders to its west. Berkeley 90 is a smaller open cluster, with a diameter of 5 arcminutes. More than 16 members appear in an amateur telescope.

=== Deep-sky objects ===
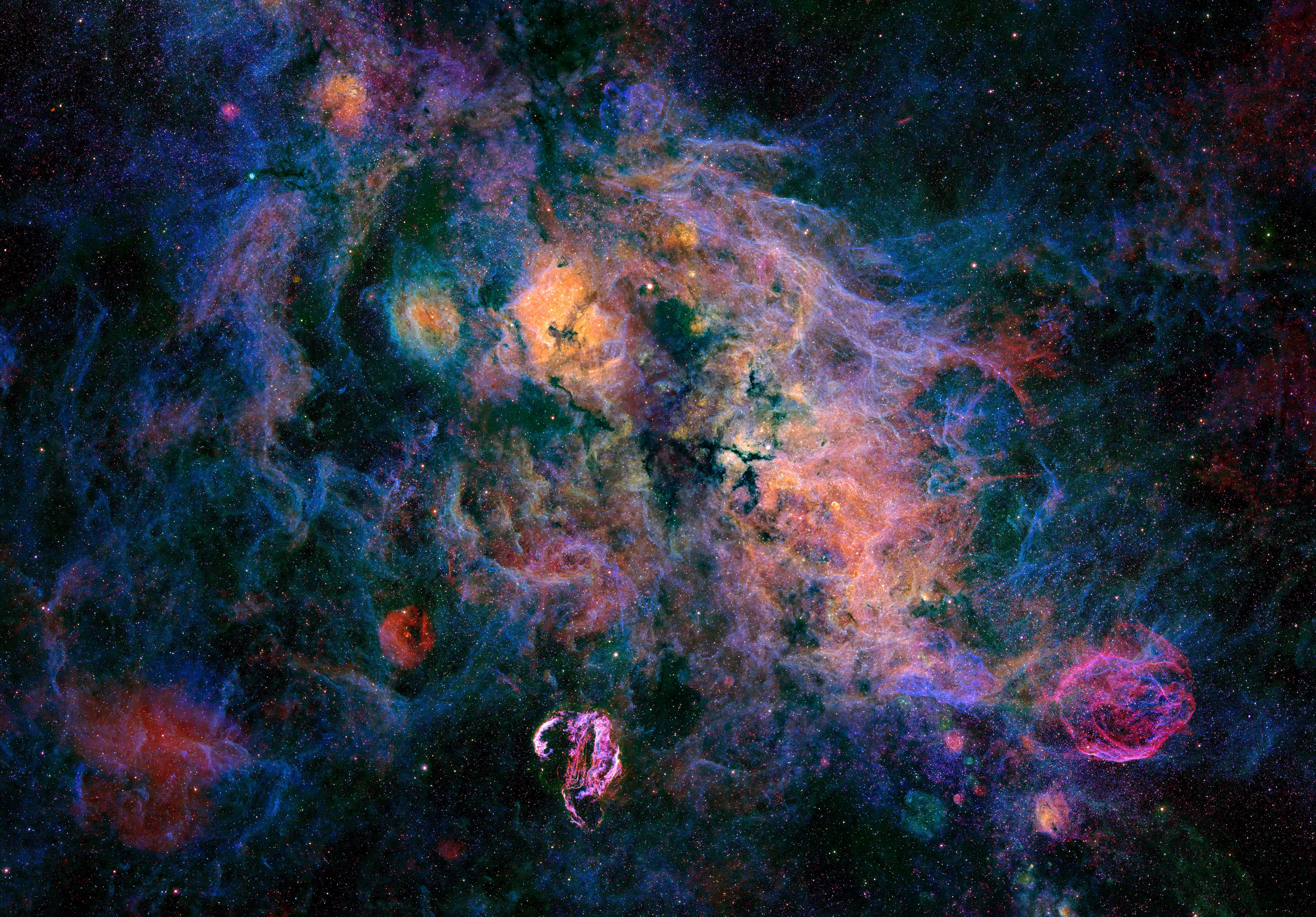
Overview image of the Cygnus region in emission lines, as seen by the Northern Sky Narrowband Survey. (Click "More details" for annotations.)

The Milky Way toward Cygnus is highly active and contains numerous star-forming regions, supernova remnants, H II regions, and planetary nebulae (see the image on the left). In the past, based on X-ray observations (see the eROSITA image above), many of these objects were thought to be part of a single large structure known as the Cygnus Superbubble. However, detailed studies have shown that these objects are located at different distances, suggesting that the Cygnus Superbubble is likely an illusion.

NGC 6826, the Blinking Planetary Nebula, is a planetary nebula with a magnitude of 8.5, 3200 light-years from Earth. It appears to "blink" in the eyepiece of a telescope because its central star is unusually bright (10th magnitude). When an observer focuses on the star, the nebula appears to fade away. Less than one degree from the Blinking Planetary is the double star 16 Cygni.

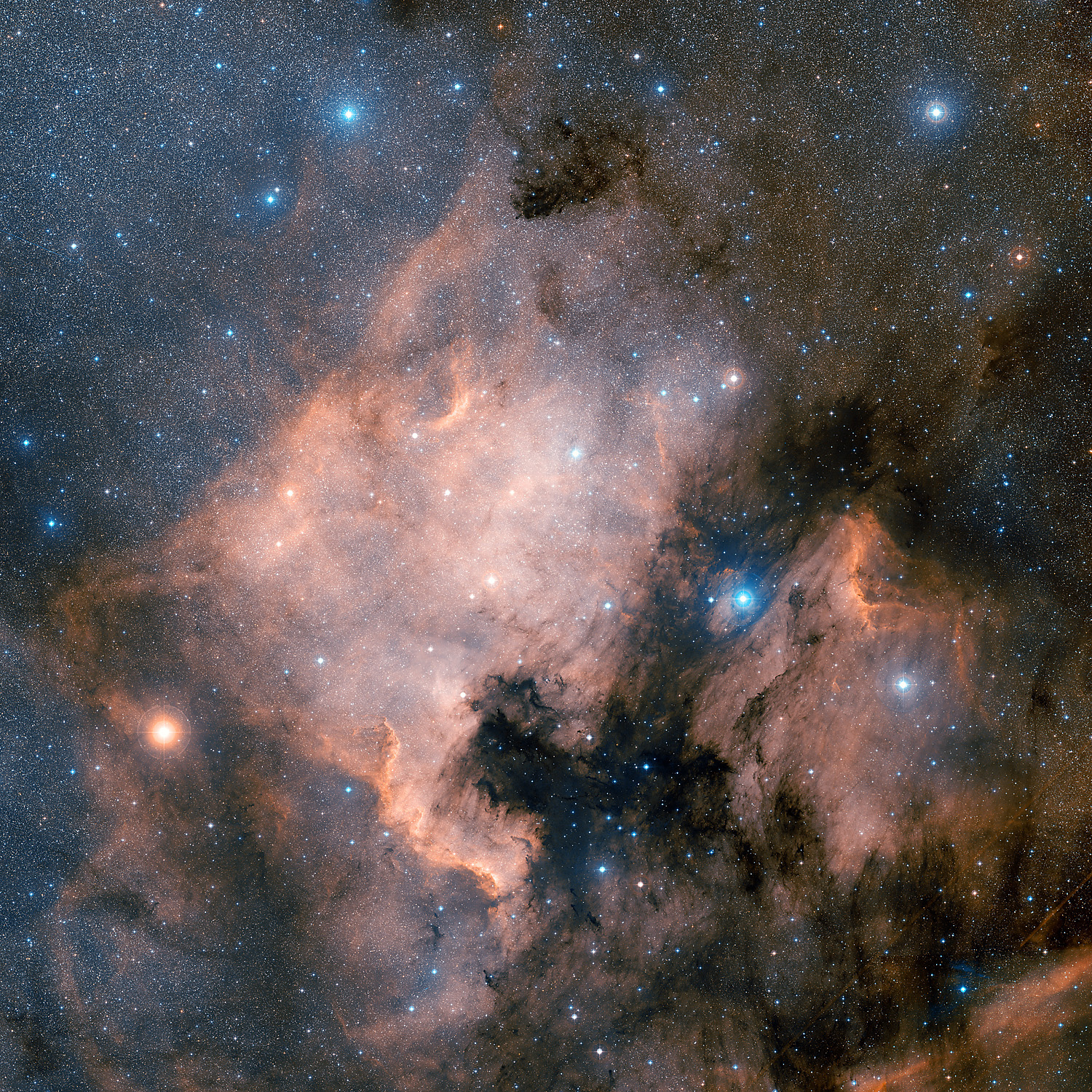
Sh 2-117, consisting of the North America Nebula (NGC 7000, left) and the Pelican Nebula (IC 5070, right), is one of the most well-known nebulae in Cygnus.

The North America Nebula (NGC 7000) is one of the most well-known nebulae in Cygnus, because it is visible to the unaided eye under dark skies, as a bright patch in the Milky Way. However, its characteristic shape is only visible in long-exposure photographs; it is difficult to observe in telescopes because of its low surface brightness. It has low surface brightness because it is so large; at its widest, the North America Nebula is 2 degrees across. Illuminated by a hot embedded star of magnitude 6, NGC 7000 is 1500 light-years from Earth.

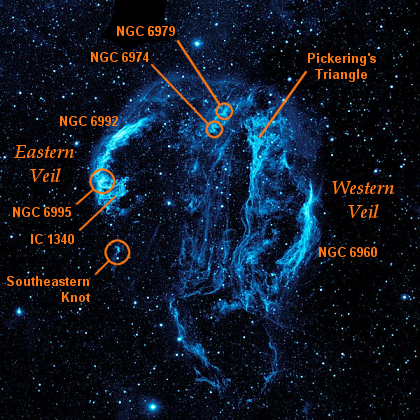
GALEX image of the Cygnus Loop. The brightest parts visible in optical light are known as the Veil Nebula.

To the south of Epsilon Cygni is the Veil Nebula (NGC 6960, 6979, 6992, and 6995), a 5,000-year-old supernova remnant covering approximately 3 degrees of the sky - it is over 50 light-years long. Because of its appearance, it is also called the Cygnus Loop. The Loop is only visible in long-exposure astrophotographs. However, the brightest portion, NGC 6992, is faintly visible in binoculars, and a dimmer portion, NGC 6960, is visible in wide-angle telescopes.

The DR 6 cluster is also nicknamed the "Galactic Ghoul" because of the nebula's resemblance to a human face;

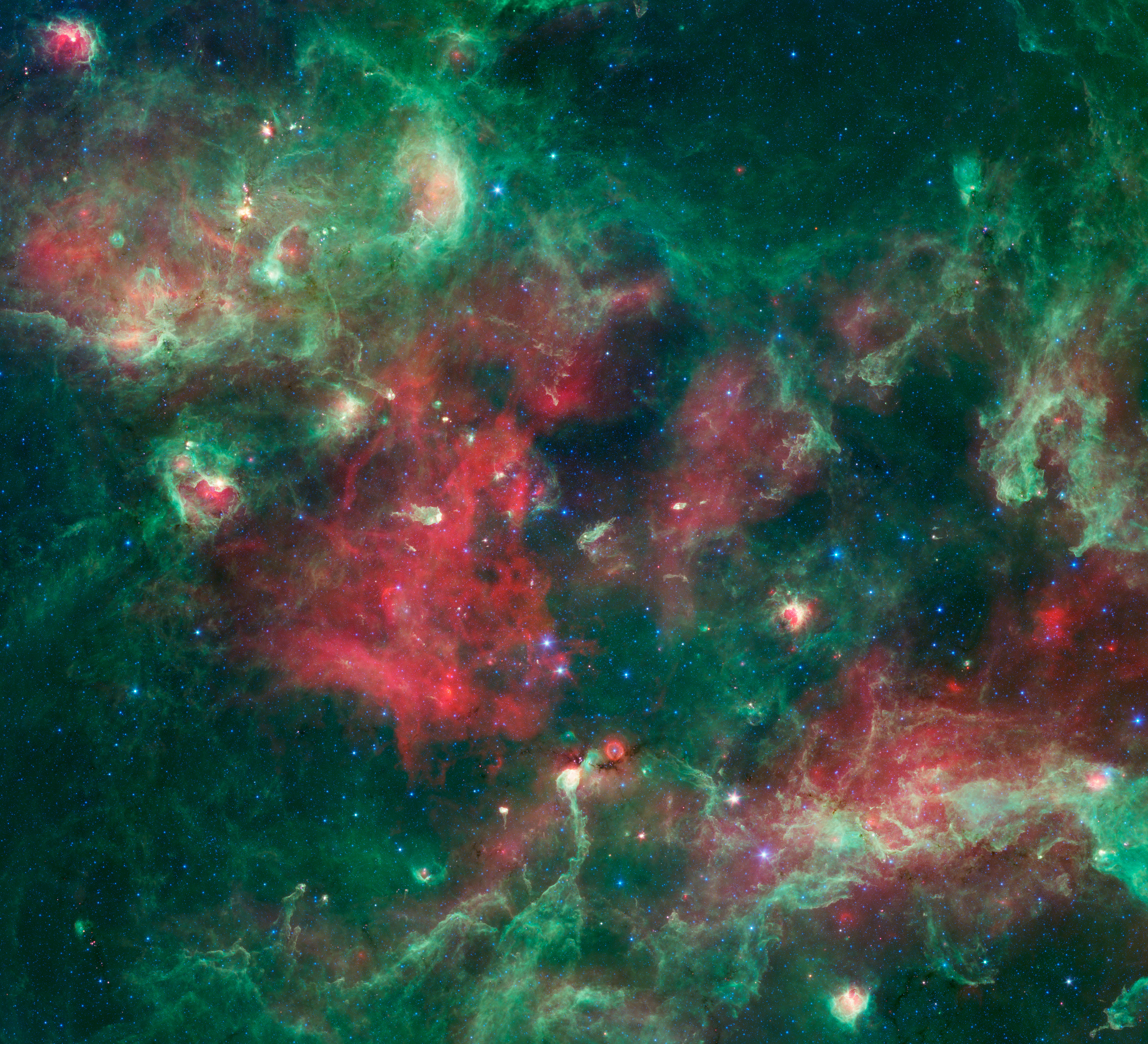
Cygnus X, a large region of star-formation in Cygnus

The Gamma Cygni Nebula (IC 1318) includes both bright and dark nebulae in an area of over 4 degrees. DWB 87 is another of the many bright emission nebulae in Cygnus, 7.8 by 4.3 arcminutes. It is in the Gamma Cygni area. Two other emission nebulae include Sharpless 2-112 and Sharpless 2-115. When viewed in an amateur telescope, Sharpless 2–112 appears to be in a teardrop shape. More of the nebula's eastern portion is visible with an O III (doubly ionized oxygen) filter. There is an orange star of magnitude 10 nearby and a star of magnitude 9 near the nebula's northwest edge. Further to the northwest, there is a dark rift and another bright patch. The whole nebula measures 15 arcminutes in diameter. Sharpless 2–115 is another emission nebula with a complex pattern of light and dark patches. Two pairs of stars appear in the nebula; it is larger near the southwestern pair. The open cluster Berkeley 90 is embedded in this large nebula, which measures 30 by 20 arcminutes.

Between Gamma and Eta Cygni lies the Crescent Nebula (NGC 6888), an emission nebula formed by the Wolf–Rayet star WR 136 at a distance of about 5,650 ly (1,700 pc). Near Eta Cygni, the Tulip nebula (Sh 2-101) and the Cygnus X-1 nebula are located. The latter is formed by jets ejected from a binary system thought to consist of a black hole and a blue supergiant.

In recent years, amateur astronomers have made some notable Cygnus discoveries. The "Soap bubble nebula" (PN G75.5+1.7), near the Crescent nebula, was discovered on a digital image by Dave Jurasevich in 2007. In 2011, Austrian amateur Matthias Kronberger discovered a planetary nebula (Kronberger 61, now nicknamed "The Soccer Ball") on old survey photos, confirmed recently in images by the Gemini Observatory; both of these are likely too faint to be detected by eye in a small amateur scope.

But a much more obscure and relatively 'tiny' object—one which is readily seen in dark skies by amateur telescopes, under good conditions—is the newly discovered nebula (likely reflection type) associated with the star 4 Cygni (HD 183056): an approximately fan-shaped glowing region of several arcminutes' diameter, to the south and west of the fifth-magnitude star. It was first discovered visually near San Jose, California and publicly reported by amateur astronomer Stephen Waldee in 2007, and was confirmed photographically by Al Howard in 2010. California amateur astronomer Dana Patchick also says he detected it on the Palomar Observatory survey photos in 2005 but had not published it for others to confirm and analyze at the time of Waldee's first official notices and later 2010 paper.

Cygnus X is the largest star-forming region in the solar neighborhood and includes not only some of the brightest and most massive stars known (such as Cygnus OB2-12), but also Cygnus OB2, a massive stellar association classified by some authors as a young globular cluster.

Cygnus A is the first radio galaxy discovered; at a distance of 730 million light-years from Earth, it is the closest powerful radio galaxy. In the visible spectrum, it appears as an elliptical galaxy in a small cluster. It is classified as an active galaxy because the supermassive black hole at its nucleus is accreting matter, which produces two jets of matter from the poles. The jets' interaction with the interstellar medium creates radio lobes, one source of radio emissions.

Diagram of the Milky Way's spiral arms

=== Other features ===
Cygnus is also the apparent source of the WIMP-wind due to the orientation of the solar system's rotation through the galactic halo.

The local Orion-Cygnus Arm and the distant Cygnus Arm are two minor galactic arms named after Cygnus for lying in its background.

== See also ==
- Cygnus in Chinese astronomy
- Cygnus (spacecraft)
- Cygnus Molecular Nebula Complex

== Bibliography ==
- Allen, R. H. (1963). Star Names: Their Lore and Meaning (Reprint ed.). New York, NY: Dover Publications Inc. ISBN 978-0-486-21079-7.
- Levy, David H. (2005). Deep Sky Objects. Prometheus Books. ISBN 978-1-59102-361-6.
- Makemson, Maud Worcester (1941). The Morning Star Rises: an account of Polynesian astronomy. Yale University Press. Bibcode:1941msra.book.....M.
- Ridpath, Ian; Tirion, Wil (2001), Stars and Planets Guide, Princeton University Press, ISBN 978-0-691-08913-3
- Ian Ridpath and Wil Tirion (2007). Stars and Planets Guide, Collins, London. ISBN 978-0-00-725120-9. Princeton University Press, Princeton. ISBN 978-0-691-13556-4.
