= Nu Cygni =

Star in the constellation Cygnus

- Location of ν Cygni (circled)

Observation data Epoch J2000 Equinox ICRS
- Constellation: Cygnus
- Right ascension: 20^{h} 57^{m} 10.41907^{s}
- Declination: +41° 10′ 01.6991″
- Apparent magnitude (V): 3.94

Characteristics
- Spectral type: A0III n
- U−B color index: +0.00
- B−V color index: +0.02

Astrometry
| Radial velocity (R_{v}) | −27.60 km/s |
| Proper motion (μ) | RA: +9.64 mas/yr Dec.: −22.75 mas/yr |
| Parallax (π) | 8.71±0.34 mas |
| Distance | 370 ± 10 ly (115 ± 4 pc) |
| Absolute magnitude (M_{V}) | −1.36 |

Details

ν Cyg A
| Mass | 3.62±0.08 M_{☉} |
| Radius | 7.55 (Note: Radius calculated using temperature and luminosity) R_{☉} |
| Luminosity | 412 L_{☉} |
| Temperature | 9,462 K |
| Rotational velocity (v sin i) | 217 km/s |

Other designations
- ν Cyg, 58 Cyg, BD+40°4364, GC 29251, HD 199629, HIP 103413, HR 8028, SAO 50274, WDS J20572+4110AB

Database references
| SIMBAD | data |

Nu Cygni is a binary star system in the constellation Cygnus. Its name is a Bayer designation that is Latinized from ν Cygni and abbreviated Nu Cyg or ν Cyg. This system is visible to the naked eye as a point of light with a combined apparent visual magnitude of 3.94. It is located approximately 374 light years away from the Sun based on parallax, but is drifting closer with a line of sight velocity component of −27.6 km/s.

The brighter component is a magnitude 4.07 star with a stellar classification of A0III n, where the 'n' indicates broad "nebulous" absorption lines due to rapid rotation. This white-hued body presents as a giant star with an estimated 3.6 times the mass of the Sun and about 7.55 times the Sun's radius. It is radiating 412 times the Sun's luminosity from its photosphere at an effective temperature of 9,462 K. The magnitude 6.4 companion has an angular separation of 0.24" from the primary.
