= Tonk =

Tonk may refer to:

== Places ==
=== India ===
- Tonk, India, city in Rajasthan
  - Tonk (Lok Sabha constituency)
  - Tonk (Rajasthan Assembly constituency)
  - Tonk district
  - Tonk State, Indian princely state (1806–1949)
- Tonk, Raebareli, a village in Uttar Pradesh, India
- Tonk Khurd, a town in Madhya Pradesh

=== Pakistan ===
- Tonk, Pakistan

== Other uses ==
- Tonk (card game), a card game
- Tonk meteorite, a meteorite that landed near Tonk, India
- Tonk, an expression that lacks logical harmony
- Tonk, a derogatory term for people who cross the United States border illegally
- Tonk, short for Tonkinese, a breed of cat

== See also ==
- Honky Tonk (disambiguation)
- Tonka (disambiguation)
- Tonks, a surname
- Tonko
