= Scorpius OB1 =

OB association in the constellation Scorpius

The Scorpius OB1 region is a large nebular region of the Milky Way located on the Sagittarius Arm in the direction of the constellation Scorpius, where significant star formation phenomena have generated dozens of high-mass stars grouped into an extensive OB association.

The core of the association is easily visible with binoculars and even to the naked eye, coinciding with the young open cluster NGC 6231; surrounding it are other massive stars and a large number of low- and intermediate-mass stars, only a small fraction of which have likely been discovered and observed. These lower-mass stars generally appear older than their massive counterparts and may result from an earlier wave of star formation in the region.

Scorpius OB1 is surrounded by substantial amounts of gas and dust, much of it ionized, visible as H II regions cataloged as IC 4628 and Gum 55.

== Observation ==
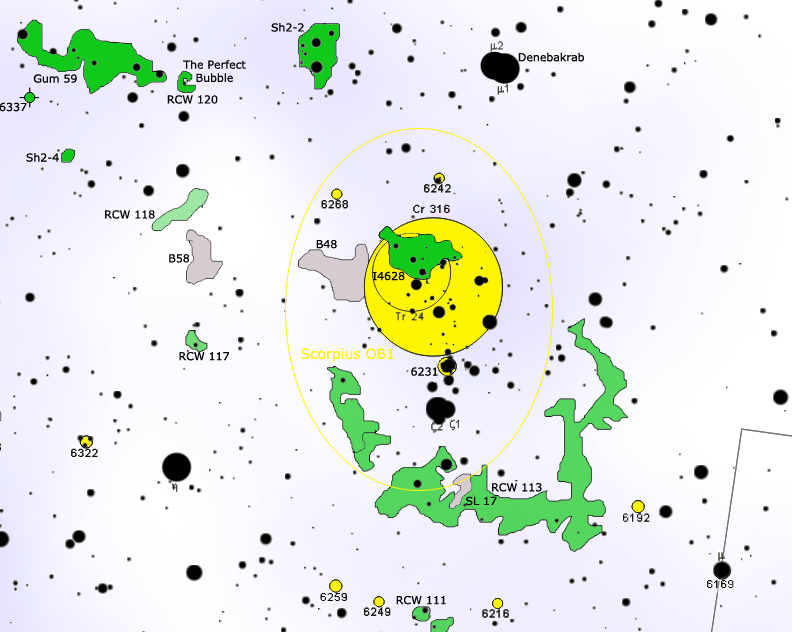
Map of Scorpius OB1.

The Scorpius OB1 region is easily observable even with a small instrument such as binoculars; its position is readily identifiable, lying just north of the star pair ζ^{1}–ζ^{2} Scorpii, which at fourth apparent magnitude is visible to the naked eye. Without instruments, the region's core—the bright open cluster NGC 6231, forming the central body of the association—appears as a hazy or granular patch. Medium-sized binoculars can resolve this cluster into dozens of closely packed components, surrounded by numerous blue stars immersed in a rich star field. Associated nebulae, particularly on the northern side, are detectable in long-exposure or composite photographs, which may also reveal filaments on the opposite side, south of the ζ Scorpii pair.

For observers in the Northern Hemisphere, visibility is somewhat limited: the declination of Scorpius OB1 is moderately southern, becoming visible above the southern horizon only from latitudes in southern Europe, well south of the 50th parallel north; good visibility occurs from lower temperate or tropical regions. The Southern Hemisphere offers ideal conditions, with the object visible for much of the year from all regions outside the tropics.

== Structure ==
The Scorpius OB1 association region is a highly extended group of young, massive stars belonging to the earliest spectral classes (O and B); it is located near the outer edge of the Sagittarius Arm, specifically on the side facing the Solar System, which resides in the Orion Arm, the galactic spiral arm immediately outward from the Sagittarius Arm. The central core of the association consists of the bright cluster NGC 6231, whose components emit substantial electromagnetic radiation that excites and ionizes gases in nearby nebular complexes, notably Gum 55. This large cloud lies on the southern edge of the region and has an unusual ring-like elongated shape centered near the stars of NGC 6231, extending up to 5°. Along the line of sight, several minor nebular areas overlap, actually located at distances of only 100–300 parsecs from the Sun and likely associated with the Lupus Cloud in the Orion Arm; these faint nebulae cause the slight extinction observed in Scorpius OB1 stars.

The distance to this prominent galactic region has been studied by various research groups, yielding occasionally conflicting values. Early studies based on photometry provided a distance of about 1,800 parsecs (5,870 light-years); subsequent research varied from a minimum of 600 parsecs, derived from parallax measurements of O-class stars (some yielding negative values, deemed implausible by the authors themselves), to 1,900 and 2,100 parsecs. The average and most commonly accepted distance, however, is approximately 1,600 parsecs, corresponding to 5,216 light-years.

The age of the central cluster has been estimated using data from various measurements, from the zero-age main sequence (ZAMS) to characteristics of the numerous Wolf–Rayet stars in the region; these agree that the stellar components are extremely young, averaging 2.5 to 4.5 million years for the most massive stars and 1 to 12 million years for low- and intermediate-mass components.

== Star formation phenomena ==
The most well-known and studied star formation phenomena in this region are concentrated on its western edge, in a protrusion of the Gum 55 cloud colloquially known as the Large Elephant Trunk (LET), similar to that in Cepheus; within it, three small reflection nebulae have been identified, designated vdBH 73a, 73b, and 73c, with the primary component, vdBH 73a, illuminated by the B-type main-sequence blue-white star CPD −41°7613. This large trunk-shaped structure is thought to have been sculpted by the combined action of the strong stellar wind from the most massive stars in NGC 6231, which, in addition to creating a large bubble—evident in the ring-like shape of Gum 55—has compressed gas in the outer regions, triggering a second wave of star formation observed in the Large Elephant Trunk.

The Large Elephant Trunk contains several denser gaseous globules; at the structure's tip, 16 faint sources with emissions in the Hα band have been observed, certainly coinciding with an equal number of young low- and intermediate-mass stars likely associated with the more massive stars illuminating the vdBH 73 components. Also at the trunk's tip, two radio sources have been identified, cataloged as SFO 82a and SFO 82b.

The northern cloud of the region, IC 4628 (RCW 116), is also the brightest; it directly receives radiation from the association's massive stars, particularly the connected cluster Trumpler 24. The primary ionizing star is believed to be the blue giant HD 152723, of spectral class O6; other sources suggest HD 322417, also O5 or O6 class, though it may lie at a greater distance from Scorpius OB1. The region hosts about sixty sources of various types, including 19 infrared sources identified by IRAS and 8 masers, comprising 5 hydroxyl , one water, and one methanol; the Be star MCW 1264 (HD 152291), a blue bright giant with strong emission lines in its spectrum, is also associated with the cloud. A 2003 study identified three young clusters deeply embedded in the cloud's gases, emitting infrared radiation; these clusters, the last of which appears less rich, are cataloged as [DBS2003] 113, 114, and 117.

== Stellar components ==
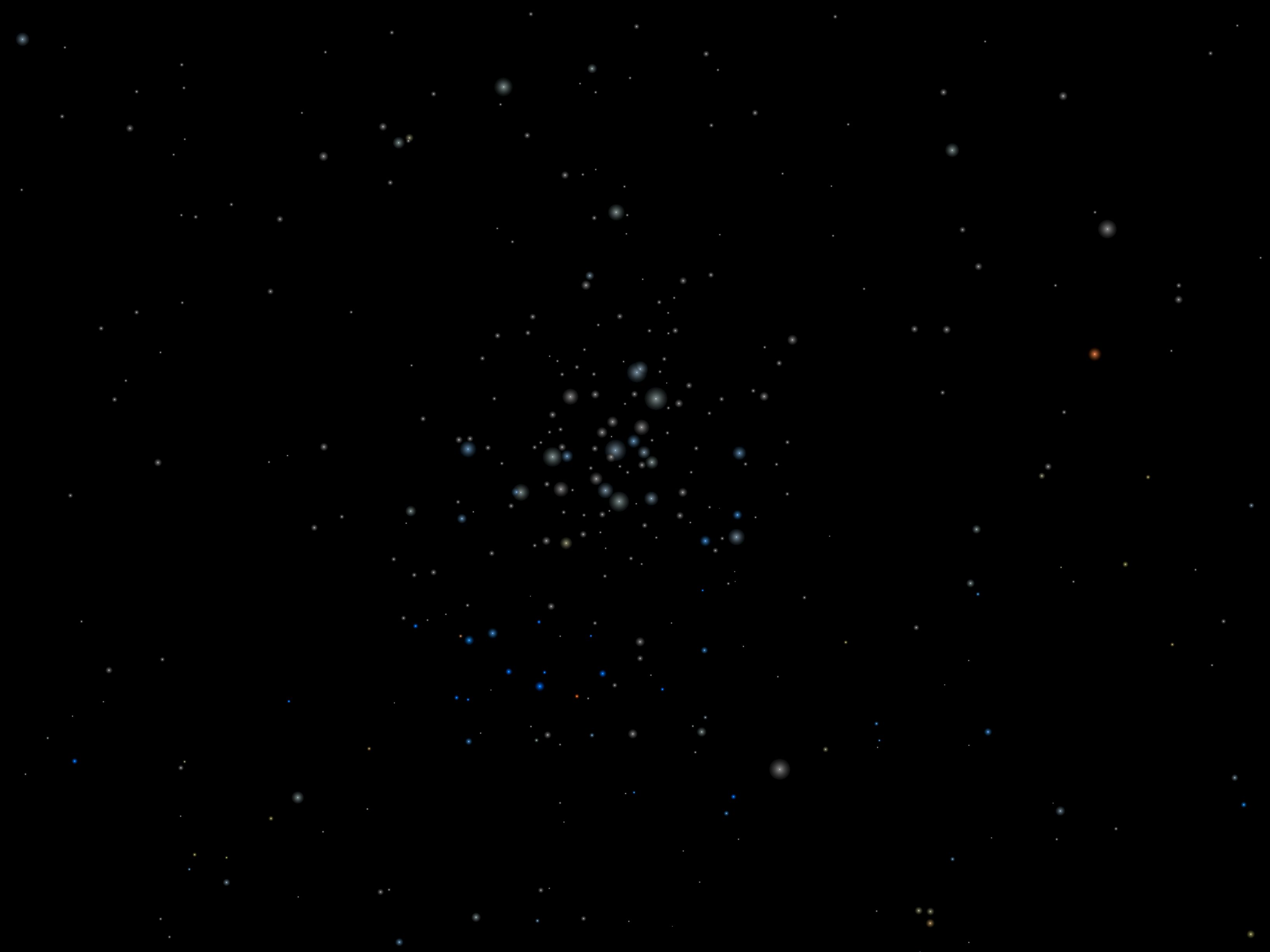
High-resolution detail of NGC 6231, the core of the Scorpius OB1 association

The massive stellar components of the region are grouped in the Scorpius OB1 association, a large and young OB association aged only 3–5 million years. The most massive stars include 28 giants and supergiants of the earliest spectral classes, prominently HD 151804 and HD 152236, two blue supergiants of classes O8Iaf and B1.5Ia, respectively. The core of Scorpius OB1 consists of and is represented by the massive cluster NGC 6231, which contains over 100 high-mass stars, including 15 blue O-class stars. The brightest component of NGC 6231 is HD 152248, also known by its variable star designation V1007 Sco; it is a strong X-ray source and a spectroscopic binary and eclipsing binary, with both components O-class and masses of nearly 30 M⊙. It is joined by two similar binaries, CPD −41°7742 and HD 152219.

The massive components of the association, particularly in NGC 6231, have proven in several cases to be spectroscopic binaries; it is believed that over half of the O-class stars in the region are close binaries with periods of less than 10 days. This phenomenon may be significant for studying the formation of massive stars. From Earth’s perspective, about a dozen of these stars have orbits oriented such that the components eclipse each other, producing apparent variability in the system. One original component of this cluster is thought to have departed at high velocity toward the cluster NGC 6281: the runaway star HD 153919, a blue supergiant bound to the strong X-ray source 4U1700-37; these two objects eclipse each other, forming a high-mass X-ray binary. The companion, particularly compact, is believed to be either a highly compact neutron star or a stellar black hole.

Given the young age of Scorpius OB1 stars, the low- and intermediate-mass young stars originating in this region should form a substantial population of T Tauri stars; however, their great distance hinders observation. Until the late 2000s, only a few hundred faint X-ray sources surrounding the core of NGC 6231 were known, seemingly originating from a sizable population of low- and intermediate-mass stars aged around 10 million years, mostly about to enter the main-sequence phase. These observations allow tracing the stages of star formation processes in the region; it likely began at least ten million years ago, producing low- and intermediate-mass stars, intensifying until a starburst event about 3–5 million years ago generated the massive stars now comprising Scorpius OB1.

A 2009 study analyzing data from the Chandra X-ray Observatory identified over 1,600 sources, about 90% of which coincide with stars truly associated with the region; most emissions come from low- to intermediate-mass stars down to 0.3 M⊙, aged 2 to 10 million years. The study also highlighted mass segregation, with the most massive stars concentrated in the cluster's central regions.

== See also ==
- OB association
- H II region

== Bibliography ==
=== General texts ===
- O'Meara, Stephen James (2007). Deep Sky Companions: Hidden Treasures. Cambridge University Press. ISBN 978-0-521-83704-0.
- Robert Burnham, Jr (1978). Burnham's Celestial Handbook: Volume Two. New York: Dover Publications, Inc.
- Thomas T. Arny (2007). Explorations: An Introduction to Astronomy (3 updated ed.). Boston: McGraw-Hill. ISBN 978-0-07-321369-9.
- The Universe – Great Encyclopedia of Astronomy. Novara: De Agostini. 2002.
- Gribbin, J. (2005). Encyclopedia of Astronomy and Cosmology. Milan: Garzanti. ISBN 88-11-50517-8.
- Owen, W. (2006). Illustrated Atlas of the Universe. Milan: Il Viaggiatore. ISBN 88-365-3679-4.

=== Specific texts ===
==== On stellar evolution ====
- Lada, C. J.; N. D. Kylafits (1999). The Origin of Stars and Planetary Systems. Kluwer Academic Publishers. ISBN 0-7923-5909-7.
- De Blasi, A. (2002). The Stars: Birth, Evolution and Death. Bologna: CLUEB. ISBN 88-491-1832-5.
- Abbondi, C. (2007). Universe in Evolution from the Birth to the Death of Stars. Sandit. ISBN 978-88-89150-32-0.

==== On the Scorpius OB1 association ====
- Reipurth, B. (December 2008). "Young Stars in NGC 6231 and the Sco OB1 Association". Handbook of Star Forming Regions, Volume II: The Southern Sky ASP Monograph Publications. Vol. 5. p. 401. Bibcode:2008hsf2.book..401R.

=== Star charts ===
- Toshimi Taki (2005). "Taki's 8.5 Magnitude Star Atlas". Archived from the original on November 5, 2018. – Freely downloadable celestial atlas in PDF format.
- Tirion; Rappaport; Lovi (1987). Uranometria 2000.0 – Volume II – The Southern Hemisphere to +6°. Richmond, Virginia, USA: Willmann-Bell, inc. ISBN 0-943396-15-8.
- Tirion; Sinnott (1998). Sky Atlas 2000.0 (2 ed.). Cambridge, USA: Cambridge University Press. ISBN 0-933346-90-5.
- Tirion (2001). The Cambridge Star Atlas 2000.0 (3 ed.). Cambridge, USA: Cambridge University Press. ISBN 0-521-80084-6.
