= HD 152408 =

Star in the constellation of Scorpius

- Location of WR 79a (circled)

Observation data Epoch J2000 Equinox ICRS
- Constellation: Scorpius
- Right ascension: 16^{h} 54^{m} 58.5051^{s}
- Declination: −41° 09′ 03.093″
- Apparent magnitude (V): 5.81 – 5.85

Characteristics
- Evolutionary stage: Wolf–Rayet
- Spectral type: WN9ha
- U−B color index: −0.8
- B−V color index: 0.017
- Variable type: WR

Astrometry
Radial velocity (R_{v})	−138 km/s
Proper motion (μ)	RA: +0.47 mas/yr Dec.: −2.25 mas/yr
Parallax (π)	0.5417±0.0506 mas
Distance	6,000 ± 600 ly (1,800 ± 200 pc)
Absolute magnitude (M_{V})	−7.1

Details
Mass	27.3 M_{☉}
Radius	45 R_{☉}
Luminosity (bolometric)	850,000 L_{☉}
Surface gravity (log g)	3.32 cgs
Temperature	35,481 K
Age	4.8 Myr

Other designations
- HD 152408, WR 79a, HR 6272, HIP 82775, SAO 227425, CD−40°10919, Trumpler 24 159

Database references
SIMBAD	data

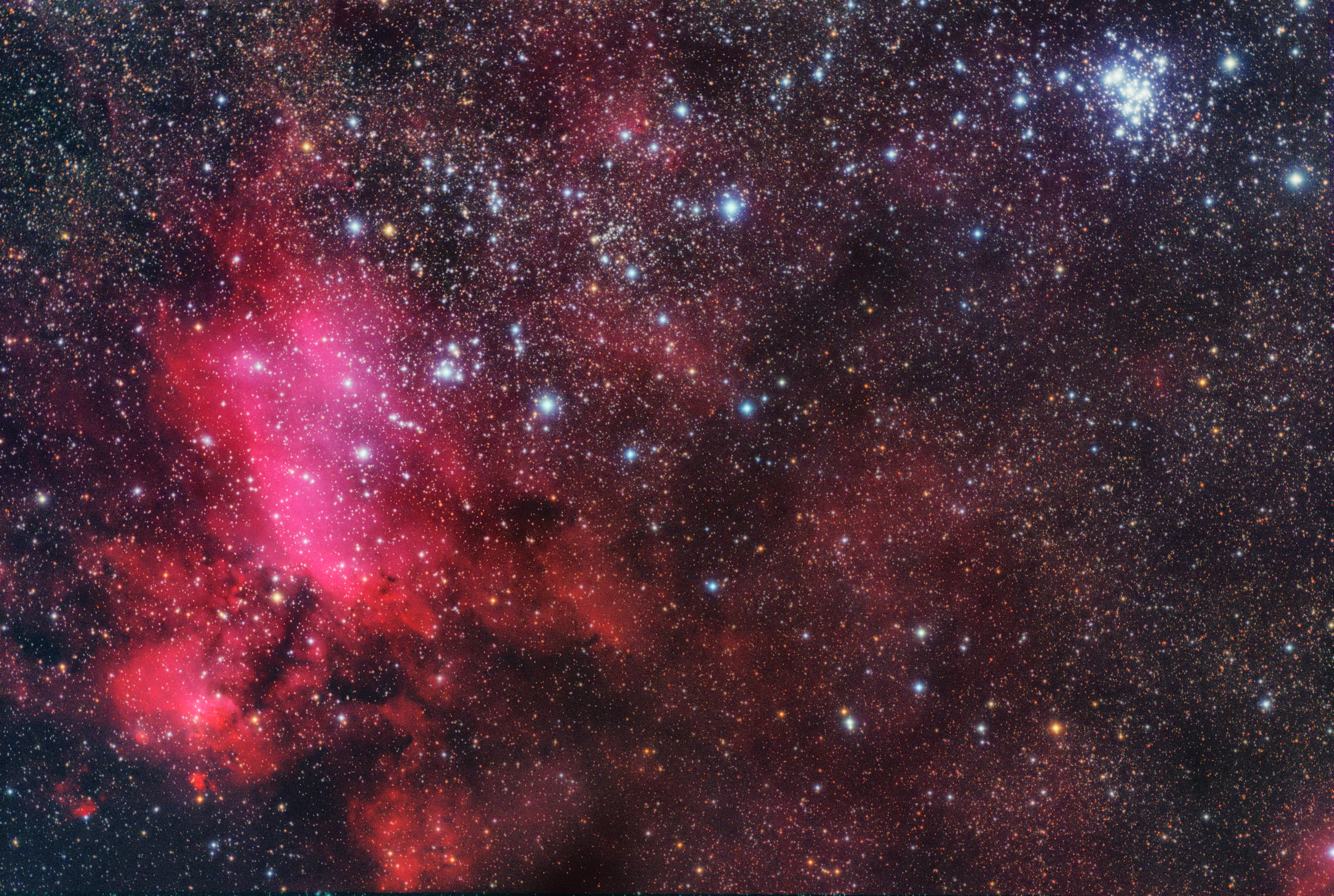
HD 152408 in Trumpler 24 is the brightest star (circled), between the Prawn Nebula on the left and NGC 6231 on the right.

HD 152408, also known as WR 79a, is a Wolf-Rayet star located in the constellation Scorpius, close to the galactic plane. Its distance is around 1,800 parsecs (6,000 light-years) away from the Earth.

HD 152408 lies in the north of the open cluster NGC 6231, the center of the OB association Scorpius OB1; it is not clear whether it is a part of the association or not. With an apparent magnitude of about 5.8, it is the third brightest Wolf-Rayet star and it can only be seen with the naked eye under excellent viewing conditions. The other Wolf-Rayet stars that can be seen with the naked eye are γ^{2} Velorum (WR 11), θ Muscae (WR 48), WR 22, WR 24 and HD 151932 (WR 78).

HD 152408 is over 20 times as massive as the Sun. Like most extremely massive stars, it is losing mass via its stellar wind. The total rate of mass loss is 2.4×10^{−5} M_{☉}/yr. With an effective temperature of 35,000 K, its bolometric luminosity is more than 600,000 L_{☉}.
