= Tunks =

Tunks is a surname, and may refer to:

- Jason Tunks (born 1975), international level discus thrower
- Julia Tunks (born 2006), Canadian discus thrower
- Leicester Tunks (1880-1935), operatic baritone and actor
- Lieja Tunks (born 1976), shot putter
- Peter Tunks (born 1958), Australian former professional rugby league footballer
- Roy Tunks (born 1951), professional footballer
- William Tunks (born 1816), Australian politician

== See also ==
- Tonks
- Trunks (disambiguation)
- Tunk
