= Troska (disambiguation) =

Troska is a village in Poland.

Troska may also refer to:

- 17776 Troska, main-belt asteroid

== People with the surname ==
- Jan Matzal Troska, Czech writer

== See also ==
- Toska (disambiguation)
- Trosky (disambiguation)
