= Tosca (disambiguation) =

Tosca is an opera by Giacomo Puccini.

Tosca may also refer to:

== Entertainment ==
- Tosca (1953 EMI recording), a recording of Puccini's opera conducted by Victor de Sabata
- Tosca (1941 film), an Italian film by Carl Koch
- Tosca (1956 film), an Italian musical melodrama film
- Tosca (2001 film), a French drama film
- Tosca (band), Austrian electronic band

== Science and technology ==
- TOSCA or TSCA, US Toxic Substances Control Act of 1976
- OASIS TOSCA (Topology and Orchestration Specification for Cloud Applications), a cloud computing standard
- Tricentis Tosca, a software testing tool
- TOSCA, a neutron spectrometer at the ISIS neutron source
- Project TOSCA (Toolbox for Surface Comparison and Analysis), a research project at the Technion – Israel Institute of Technology
- TOSCA (Tectonic Ocean Spreading at the Charlie-Gibbs fracture zone)

== Other uses ==
- La Tosca, an 1887 play by Victorien Sardou, from which Puccini's opera was adapted
  - La Tosca (disambiguation), several films based on Sardou's play
- Daewoo Tosca, an automobile model
- Uva Tosca or Tosca, a grape varietal
- Tosca (moth), a genus of moth
- Tosca, a fragrance by Mäurer & Wirtz
- Tosca, a Michelin-starred restaurant in The Ritz-Carlton, Hong Kong
- Tosca, North West

== People ==
- Carlos Tosca (born 1953), sport manager
- Tosca Kramer (1903–1976), violinist
- Tosca Lee (born 1969), author
- Tosca Musk (born 1974), filmmaker
- Tosca Reno (born 1959), fitness and nutrition author
- Tosca (born 1967), Italian singer and actress

== See also ==
- La Tosca Flats, an historic building in Cincinnati, Ohio, U.S.
- Sangiovese or Uva Tosca, a grape varietal
- Tosia, name
- Toska (disambiguation)
