= Tanka (disambiguation) =

Tanka is a form of Japanese poetry.

Tanka may also refer to:

- Tanka people, an ethnic group in China
- Tanka (Peru), a mountain in Peru
- Tanka (sword) or habaki, part of a Japanese bladed weapon
- Thangka or Tanka, a Tibetan silk painting with embroidery
- Tanka (coin), a silver coin used in South Asia

== See also ==
- Tanka movement, a militant agrarian struggle on behalf of the Hajong tribal people in East Bengal 1942-1950
- Bangladeshi taka, a currency named after the silver coin
- Tanca (disambiguation)
- Tonka (disambiguation)
- Thankam (disambiguation)
- Taanka, a type of underground cistern
- Wakan Tanka, Lakota religious concept
