= HD 151932 =

Star in the constellation of Scorpius

- Location of WR 78 (circled)

Observation data Epoch J2000 Equinox ICRS
- Constellation: Scorpius
- Right ascension: 16^{h} 52^{m} 19.24769^{s}
- Declination: −41° 51′ 16.2631″
- Apparent magnitude (V): 6.45 - 6.61

Characteristics
- Evolutionary stage: Wolf–Rayet
- Spectral type: WN7h
- U−B color index: −0.63
- B−V color index: +0.27
- Variable type: WR

Astrometry
Radial velocity (R_{v})	−25.00 km/s
Proper motion (μ)	RA: −1.914±0.169 mas/yr Dec.: −2.402±0.097 mas/yr
Parallax (π)	0.7679±0.0649 mas
Distance	1,250+150 −120 pc
Absolute magnitude (M_{V})	−5.83

Details
Mass	22 M_{☉}
Radius	10.14 R_{☉}
Luminosity (bolometric)	630,000 L_{☉}
Surface gravity (log g)	3.5 cgs
Temperature	50,100 K

Other designations
- HD 151932, WR 78, V919 Sco, HR 6249, HIP 82543, SAO 227328, CD−41°10972, Trumpler 24 322

Database references
SIMBAD	data

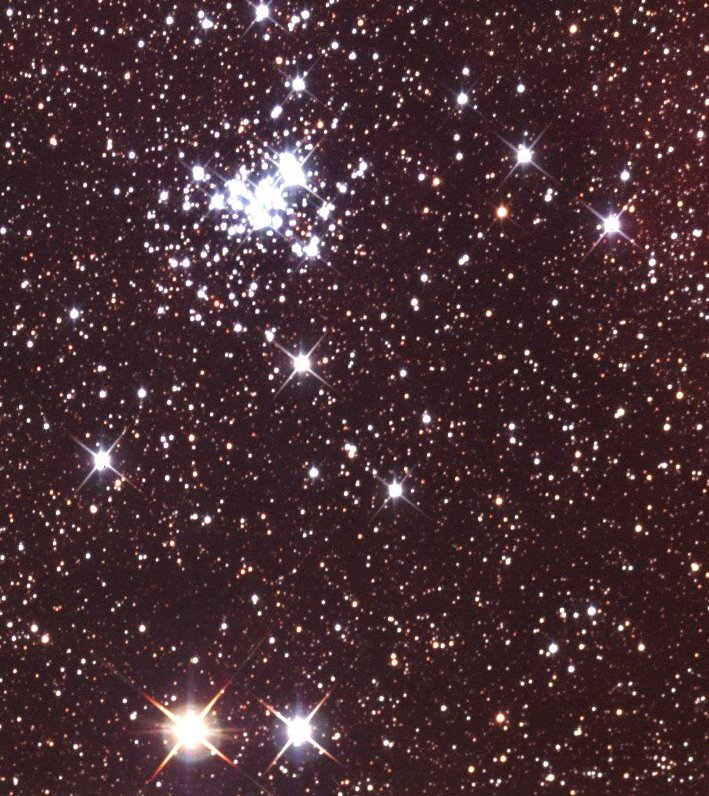
HD 151932 (circled in red) to the west of NGC 6231, with the bright pair ζ^{2} Scorpii and ζ^{1} Scorpii to the south

HD 151932, also known as WR 78, is a Wolf–Rayet star located in the constellation Scorpius, close to the galactic plane. Its distance is around 1,250 parsecs (4,100 light years) away from the Earth. Despite being a hot Wolf–Rayet star, it is extremely reddened by interstellar extinction, so its apparent magnitude is brighter for longer-wavelength passbands.

HD 151932 lies about 22′ west of the open cluster NGC 6231, the center of the OB association Scorpius OB1; it is not clear whether it is a part of the association or not. With an apparent magnitude of about 6.5, it is one of the few Wolf–Rayet stars that can be seen with the naked eye (although it can only be seen with the naked eye under excellent viewing conditions).

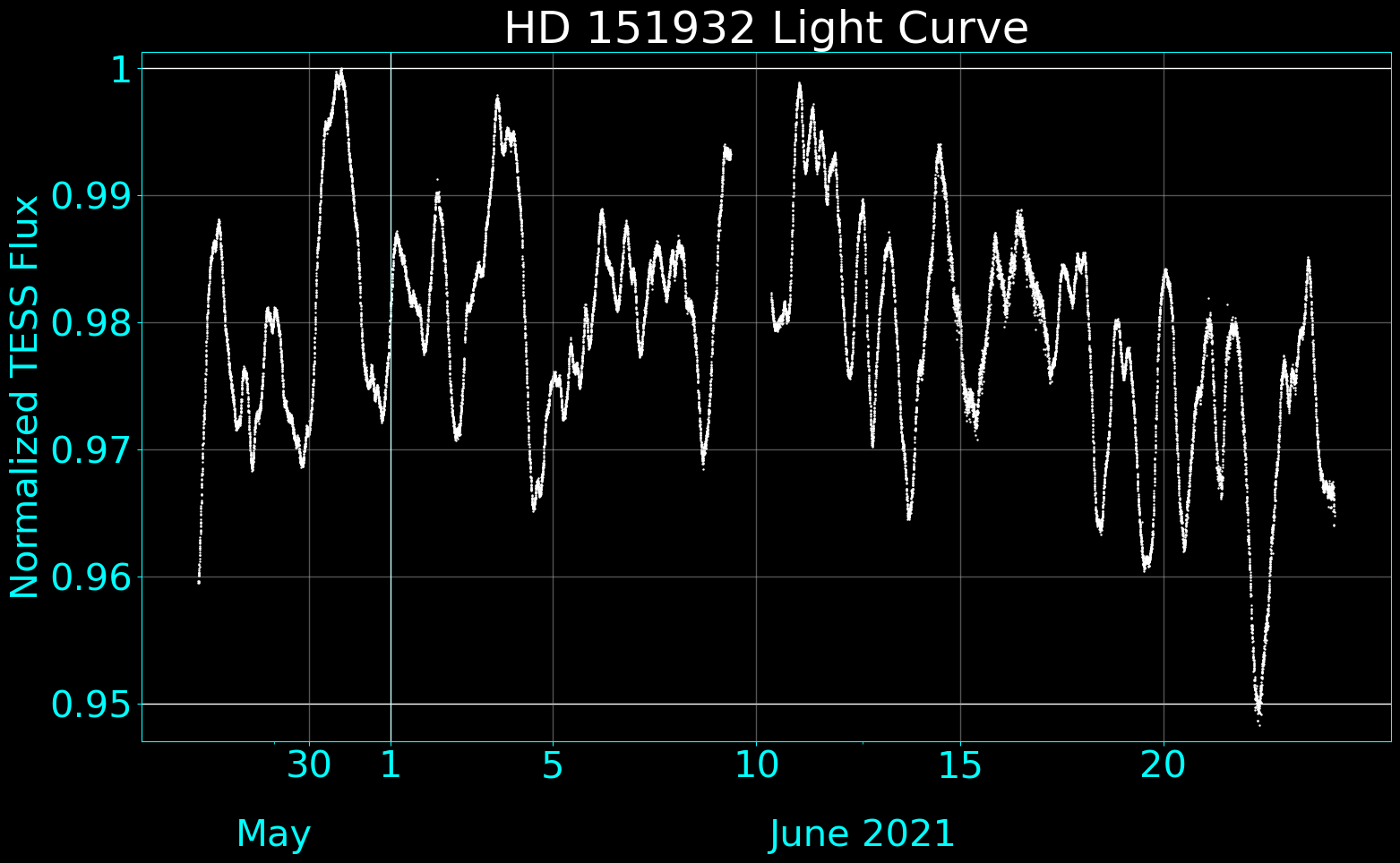
Light curve for HD 151932, plotted from TESS data.

In 1968, Alejandro Feinstein and Osvaldo E. Ferrer announced that HD 151932 is a variable star. It was given its variable star designation, V919 Scorpii, in 1981. Like most extremely massive stars, HD 151932 is losing mass via its stellar wind. The total rate of mass loss is 5×10^{−5} M_{☉}/yr. The multiplicity (i.e., whether the star is a single star or a binary star system) of HD 151932 has not been studied very much. A periodic shift in the spectrum with a period of 3.3 days (implying it is a spectroscopic binary) has been noticed, but it may be spurious; the star appears to be a single star but may be orbiting face-on and/or with a lower-mass companion.

The spectrum of HD 151932 is unusual: part of the He I absorption lines are known to be shifted towards the violet side of the electromagnetic spectrum – this has been interpreted as an expanding stellar shell. Related to this is the fact that the Si IV line varies irregularly in radial velocity, the nature of which is largely unknown. X-rays have been detected from this star, along with several other Wolf-Rayet stars such as WR 24 and WR 136.
