= Toska (disambiguation) =

Toska or Toskas may refer to the following:

== Places ==
- Toska, Island in Norway
- Toska, Struga, former village in North Macedonia
- Toska, Iran, village in Iran

== People ==
=== Surname Toska ===
- Ajet Toska (born 1961), Albanian hammer thrower
- David Toska (born 1975), Norwegian bank robber
- Haki Toska (1920–1994), Albanian politician
- Klajdi Toska (born 1994), Albanian footballer
- Leonard Toska (born 1961), Albanian weightlifting coach and former competitor
- Viron Toska (1956–2020), Albanian basketball coach and former player

=== Surname Toskas ===
- Apostolos Toskas (born 1947), Greek footballer
- Dimitrios Toskas (born 1991), Greek footballer
- Grigoris Toskas (born 1983), Greek footballer
- Nikos Toskas (born 1952), Greek general

== Other ==
- Toska, the transliterated (from Russian "Тоска") name of the Anton Checkov story that translates as "Misery"

== See also ==
- Toka (disambiguation)
- Tonka (disambiguation)
- Tosa (disambiguation)
- Tosca (disambiguation)
- Troska (disambiguation)
- Tuska (disambiguation)
- Tyska (disambiguation)
