= Tree trunk (disambiguation) =

Tree trunk is the stem and main wooden axis of a tree.

Tree trunk, or variants, may refer to:

- "Treetrunk" (song), by The Doors, 1972
- Tree Trunks, a fictional character in the American animated TV series Adventure Time
  - "Tree Trunks" (Adventure Time), an episode of the series

== See also ==
- Trunk (disambiguation)
- Cyanea copelandii, a flowering plant known as treetrunk cyanea
- Tree trunk spider
