= Trotsky (disambiguation) =

Leon Trotsky (1879–1940) was a Russian revolutionary, Soviet politician and political theorist.

Trotski, Trotskiy, Trotsky or Trotskiy may also refer to:

- Trotsky (surname)
- Trotsky (TV series), a 2017 Russian biographical TV series by Alexander Kott
- The Trotsky, a 2009 Canadian comedy film by Jacob Tierney
- Trotsky (film), a 1993 Russian biographical film by Leonid Maryagin
- Trotsky Marudu (born 1953), Indian visual artist
- Trotsky Vengarán, Uruguayan rock band

== See also ==
- Trosky (disambiguation)
- Troitsky (disambiguation)
