= Trunk =

Trunk may refer to:

== Biology ==
- Trunk (anatomy), synonym for torso
- Trunk (botany), a tree's central superstructure, and the stem of woody plants
- Trunk of corpus callosum, in neuroanatomy
- Elephant trunk, the proboscis of an elephant

== Computing ==
- Trunk (software), in revision control
- Trunk line, a system of shared network access
- VLAN, which uses a trunk port

== Entertainment and media ==
- Trunk (album), 2013 album by Ulf Lundell
- Trunk Records, a record label
- The Trunk (film), a 1961 British film
- "The Trunk" (The Twilight Zone), a television episode
- The Trunk (TV series), a 2024 South Korean television series

== Physical containers ==
- Trunk (car), a large storage compartment
- Trunk (luggage)
- Trunk (motorcycle), a storage compartment

== Other uses ==
- Trunk (surname), a German-language surname
- Trunk carrier, a type of airline regulated by the Civil Aeronautics Board of the United States up until 1978
- Trunk road, a major road
- Trunk shot, a cinematic shot from within a car trunk
- Trunk show, a merchandising event

== See also ==
- Trunks (disambiguation)
- Elephant's trunk (disambiguation)
