= IC 1396 =

Nebula in the constellation Cepheus

Emission nebula
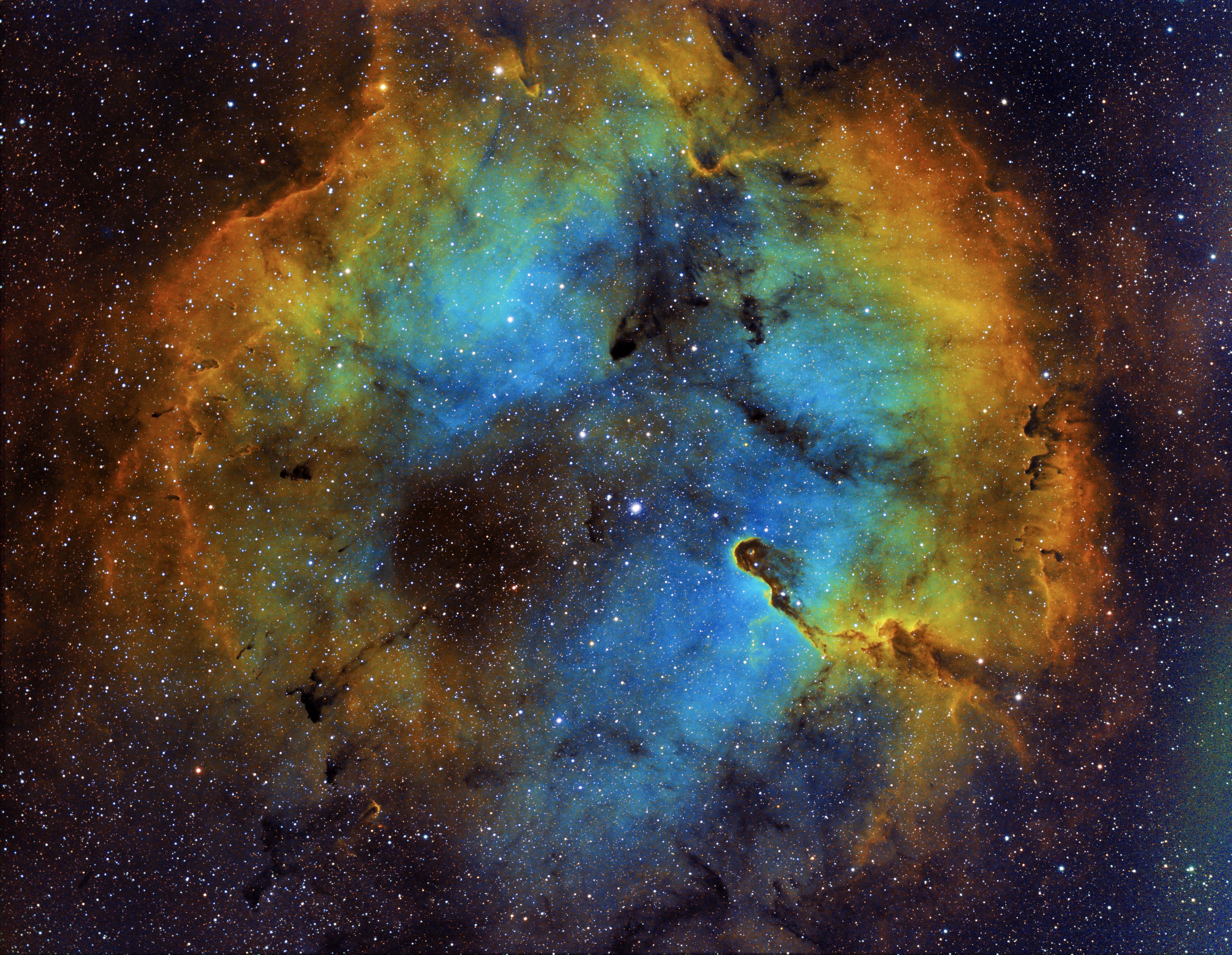

Observation data
- Distance: 2,400 ly
- Constellation: Cepheus

IC 1396 is a large emission nebula, a region of ionized gas, located in the constellation Cepheus about 2,400 light years away from Earth.

IC 1396 is illuminated and ionized by a very bright, massive multiple star HD 206267 at its center, except for dense globules that can protect themselves from the star's harsh ultraviolet rays. This hierarchical triple star system has two members that form a spectroscopic binary that orbit each other with a period of 3.7 days, while a third member lies further away—it is unclear whether this third member is gravitationally bound to the pair. The system is emitting a stellar wind that reaches an exceptional velocity of 3,225 km/s, among the highest measured for stars of this type.

Jutting from the rim of the nebula is IC 1396A, commonly called the Elephant's Trunk Nebula, a dark, dense globule with a bright, sinuous rim being illuminated by HD 206267.

The red supergiant or hypergiant Mu Cephei is located at the edge of the nebula. It is well known for being one of the largest known stars.

== See also ==
- List of largest nebulae
- Lists of nebulae

== Sources ==
- Osterbrock, D. E. (1957). "Comet-Tail Structures in Emission Nebulae". The Astrophysical Journal. 125. IOP: 622–635. Bibcode:1957ApJ...125..622O. doi:10.1086/146336.
- Schmidt, Edward G. (1974). "The Structure of Ionization Fronts in H II Regions". Monthly Notices of the Royal Astronomical Society. 169 (1): 97–116. doi:10.1093/mnras/169.1.97. ISSN 0035-8711.
