= NGC 7538 =

Diffuse nebula in the constellation Cepheus

Diffuse nebula
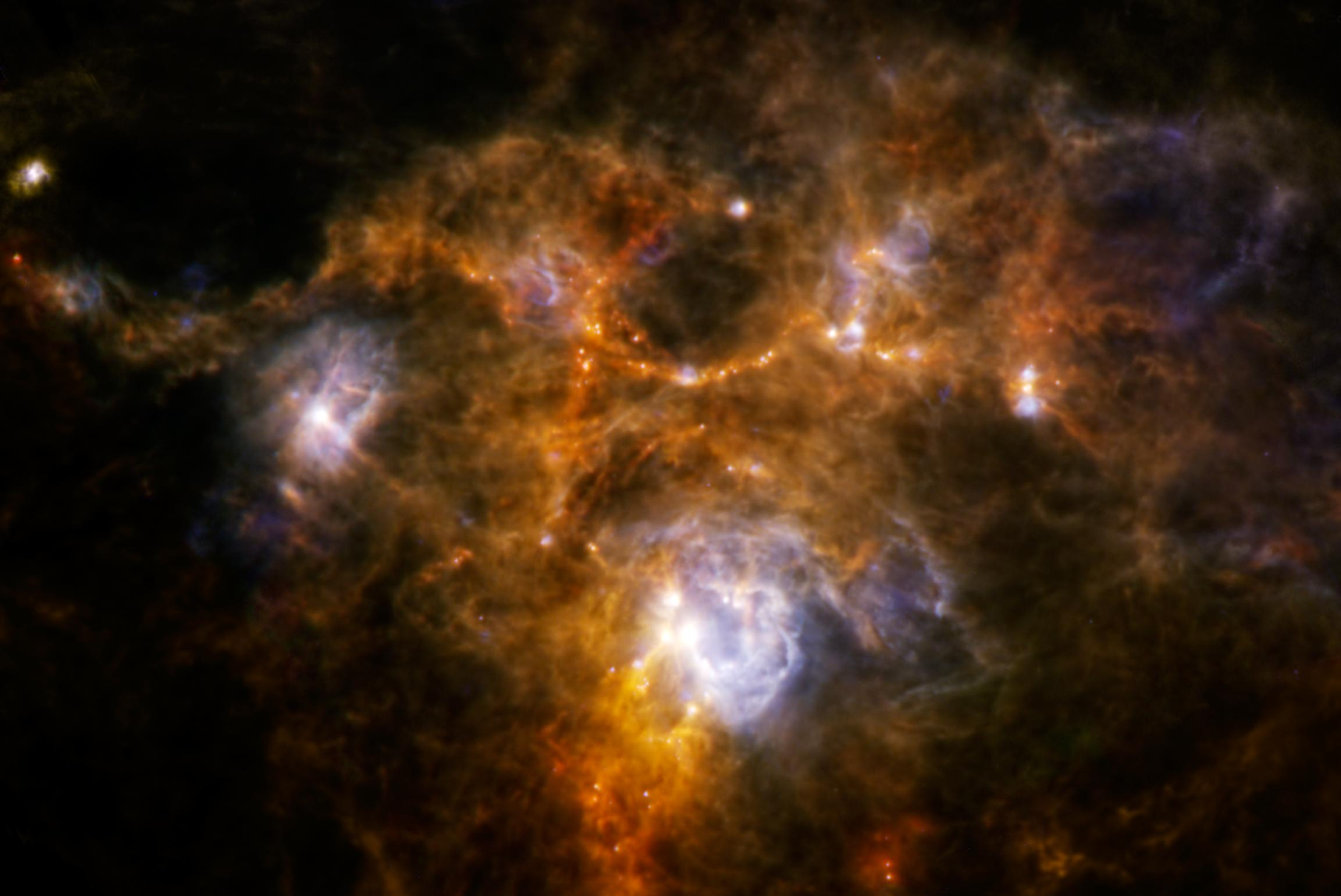
- NGC 7538; Herschel 250 μm = Red, Herschel 160 μm = Green, Herschel 70 μm = Blue

Observation data: J2000.0 epoch
- Subtype: emission or reflection
- Right ascension: 23^{h} 13^{m} 45.7^{s}
- Declination: +61° 28′ 21″
- Distance: 9,100 ly (2,800 pc)
- Apparent dimensions (V): 9′.00 × 6′.0
- Constellation: Cepheus
- Notable features: Contains largest known protostar
- Designations: Dreyer's Object, Sharpless 158

NGC 7538 (also known as the Northern Lagoon Nebula), near the more famous Bubble Nebula, is located in the constellation Cepheus. It is located about 9,100 light-years from Earth.

It is home to the biggest yet discovered protostar which is about 300 times the size of the Solar System. It is located in the Perseus Arm of the Milky Way and is probably part of the Cassiopeia OB2 complex. It is a region of active star formation including several luminous near-IR and far-IR sources. Stars in NGC 7538 are mainly low-mass pre-main-sequence stars.
