= Topia (disambiguation) =

Topia is a city and seat of the municipality of Topia, in the state of Durango, north-western Mexico.

Topia may also refer to:

- Topia Municipality, one of the municipalities in the state of Durango, north-western Mexico
- Topia (magazine), a Spanish, English-language lifestyle magazine
- Thopia family, one of the most powerful Albanian feudal families in the Late Middle Ages
  - Tanusio Thopia
  - Karl Thopia
  - George Thopia
  - Helena Thopia
  - Niketa Thopia
  - Andrea Thopia
  - Tanush Thopia
- Tane Topia (born 1976), New Zealand cricketer

== See also ==
- Thopia (disambiguation)
- Tosia, name
