= Tonka (disambiguation) =

Tonka is an American toy company.

Tonka may also refer to:

- Tonka (film), a 1958 Disney Western
- Tonka of the Gallows, a 1930 Czech movie
- Tonka (fuel), a rocket fuel
- Tonka (name)
- Tonka, Tombouctou Region, a town and commune in Mali
- Tonka beans (Dipteryx odorata), a spice
  - Tonka bean oil, extract from tonka bean
- Panavia Tornado A nickname given to the jet due to its virtually indestructible nature
- Tonka, given name of Bully XIX (2000–2011), Mississippi State Bulldogs mascot (2001–2009), English Bulldog
- Tonka, a word used by American rapper Yeat to refer to a full-size SUV

== See also ==
- Tanka (disambiguation)
- Toka (disambiguation)
- Tonda (disambiguation)
- Tonk (disambiguation)
- Tonna (disambiguation)
- Toska (disambiguation)
- Tonka Bay, Minnesota
- Ha Ha Tonka State Park, United States park
- Baba Tonka Cove, Antarctican cove
- Donogoo Tonka, 1936 German film
- Sens & Tonka, French publishing house
