= Tyska =

Tyska may refer to:

- Tyska brinken, street in Gamla stan, the old town in central Stockholm, Sweden
- Tyska brunnsplan, small, triangular public square in Gamla stan, the old town in central Stockholm, Sweden
- Tyska skolgränd, alley in Gamla stan, the old town in central Stockholm, Sweden, stretching from Svartmangatan to Baggensgatan
- Tyska stallplan, street in Gamla stan, the old town in central Stockholm, Sweden

== See also ==
- Toska (disambiguation)
