= S5 0014+81 =

Black Hole in the constellation Cepheus

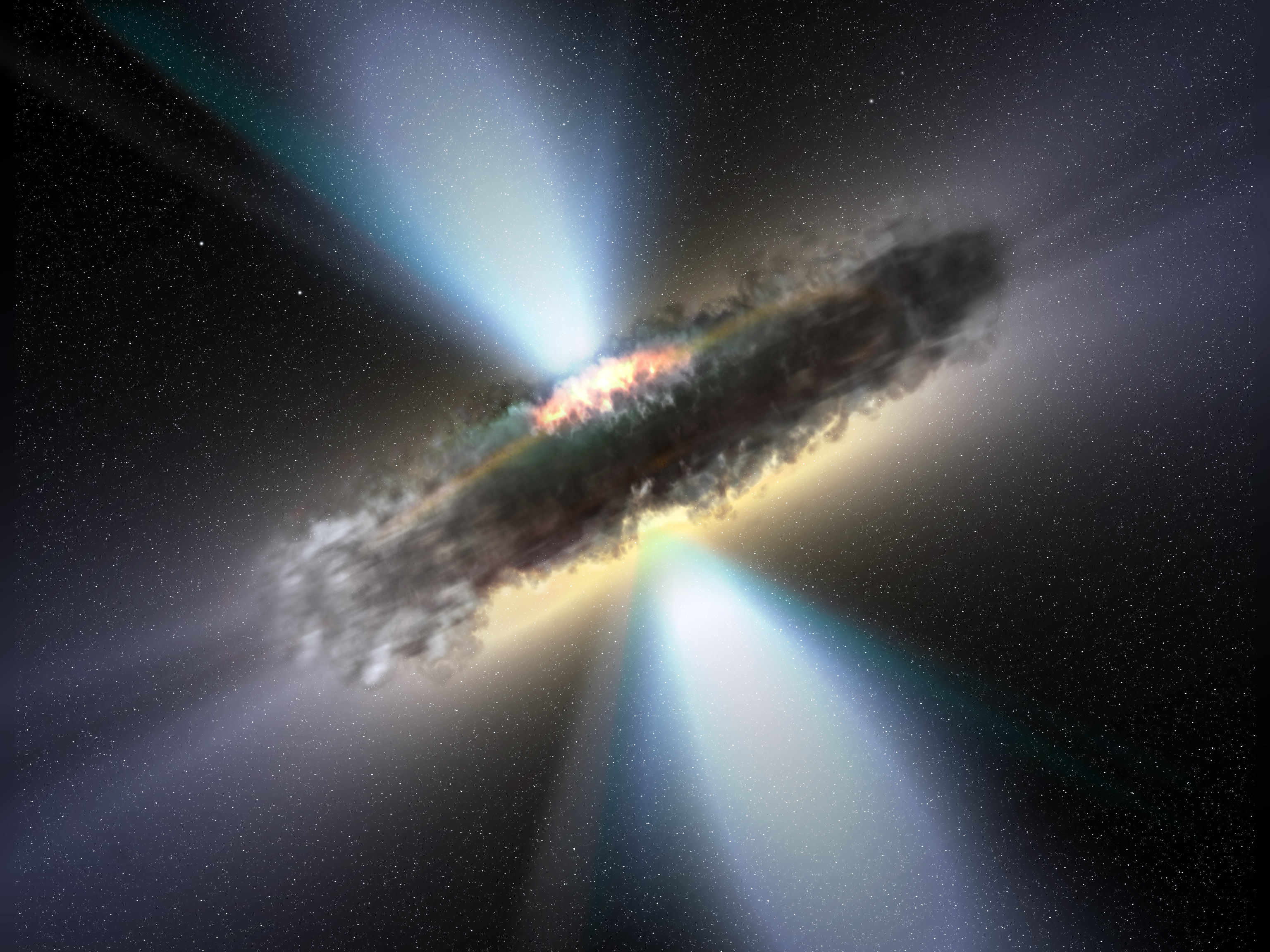
- Artist's impression of a hyperluminous quasar similar to S5 0014+81 surrounded by a thick accretion disk with two powerful jets

Observation data (Epoch )
- Constellation: Cepheus
- Right ascension: 00^{h} 17^{m} 08.5^{s}
- Declination: +81° 35′ 08″
- Redshift: 3.366
- Distance: 3.7 Gpc (1.2×10^{10} ly)
- Type: Quasar
- Apparent magnitude (V): 16.5
- Notable features: Hyperluminous quasar

Other designations
- 6C B0014+8120, Q0014+813

S5 0014+81 is a distant, compact, hyperluminous, broad-absorption-line quasar, or blazar, located near the high declination region of the constellation Cepheus, near the North Equatorial Pole.

== Characteristics ==
The object is an OVV (optically violent variable) quasar, a type of blazar. It belongs to the most energetic subclass of active galactic nuclei, which are produced by the rapid accretion of matter by a central supermassive black hole, changing gravitational energy to light energy that can be visible across cosmic distances.

In the case of S5 0014+81, it is one of the most luminous quasars known, with a total luminosity of over 10^{41} watts, equal to an absolute bolometric magnitude of −31.5. If the quasar were at a distance of 280 light-years from Earth, it would give out as much energy per square meter as the Sun does at Earth, despite being 18 million times more distant. The quasar's luminosity is therefore about 3 × 10^{14} (300 trillion) times that of the Sun, or over 25,000 times as luminous as all the 100 to 400 billion stars of the Milky Way combined, making it one of the most energetic objects in the observable universe. However, because of its huge distance of 12.1 billion light-years it can only be studied by spectroscopy. The central black hole of the quasar devours an extremely huge amount of matter, equivalent to 4,000 solar masses of material every year.

The quasar is also a very strong source of radiation, from gamma rays and X-rays down to radio waves. The quasar's designation, S5, is from the Fifth Survey of Strong Radio Sources, 0014+81 was its coordinates in epoch B1950.0. It also has the other designation 6C B0014+8120, from the Sixth Cambridge Survey of Radio Sources by the University of Cambridge.

The host galaxy of S5 0014+81 is a giant elliptical starburst galaxy, with the apparent magnitude of 24.

== Supermassive black hole ==
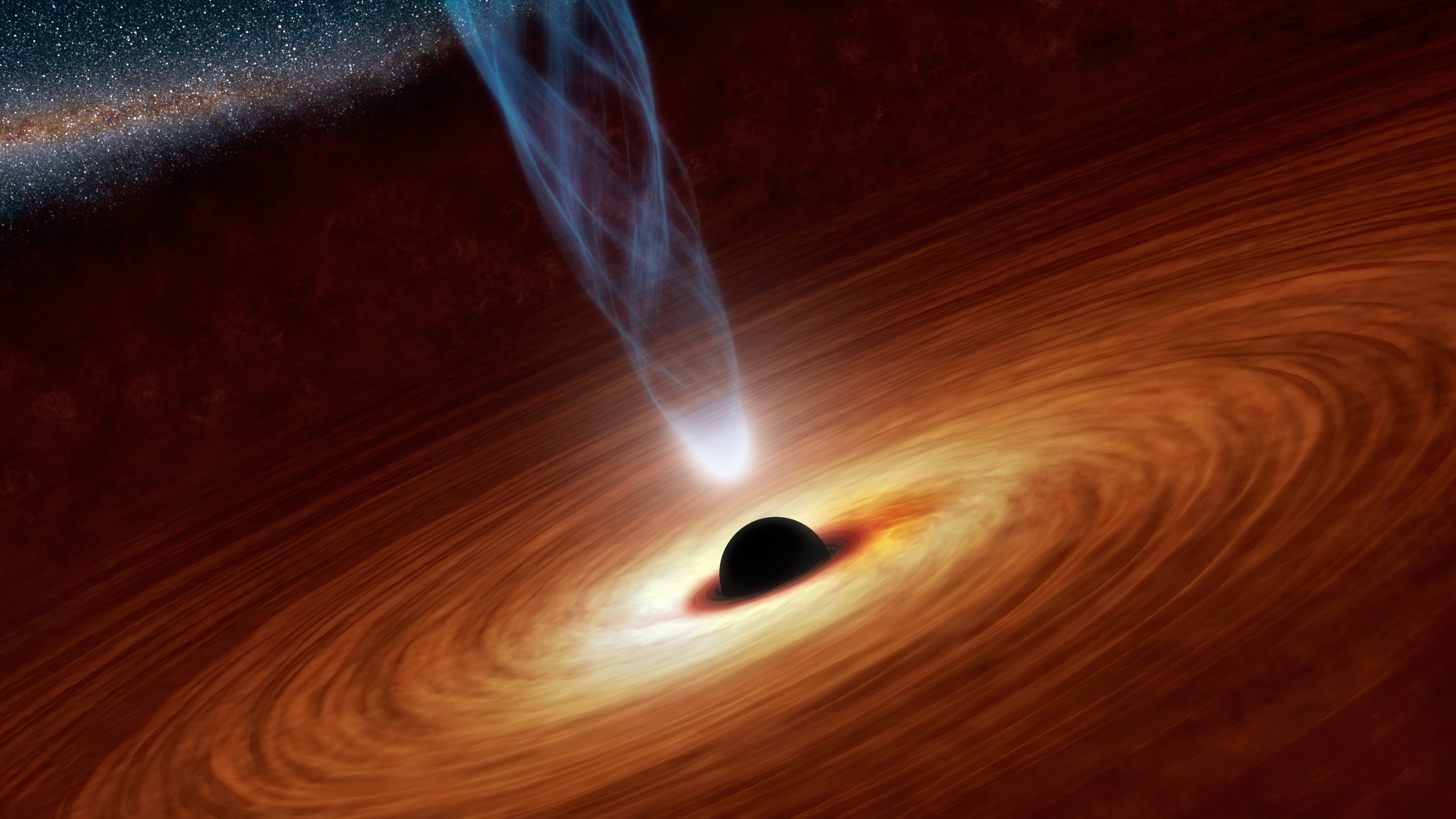
Artist's conception of a supermassive black hole devouring matter in an accretion disc with a relativistic jet of material emanating from the black hole perpendicular to the disc

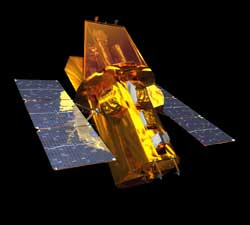
The Swift spacecraft, used by astronomers to determine the mass of the black hole of S5 0014+81

The host galaxy of S5 0014+81 is an FSRQ (flat-spectrum radio quasar) blazar, a giant elliptical galaxy that hosts a supermassive black hole at its center, which is emitting a relativistic jet in the general direction of the Earth.

In 2009, a team of astronomers using the Swift spacecraft used the luminosity of S5 0014+81 to measure the mass of its black hole. They found it to be about 10,000 times more massive than the black hole at the center of our galaxy, or equivalent to 40 billion solar masses. This makes it one of the most massive black holes ever discovered, more than six times the value of the black hole of Messier 87, which for 60 years was the largest known black hole, and was dubbed an "ultramassive" black hole. The Schwarzschild radius of this black hole is 120 billion kilometers, giving a diameter of 240 billion kilometers, 1,600 astronomical units, or about 40 times the radius of Pluto's orbit, and has a mass equivalent to four Large Magellanic Clouds. The fact that such a large black hole existed so early in the universe, at only 1.6 billion years after the Big Bang, suggests that supermassive black holes can form very quickly.

Evolution models based on the mass of S5 0014+81's supermassive black hole predict that it will live for roughly 1.3×10^{99} years (near the end of the Black Hole Era of the universe, when it is more than 10^{88} times its current age), before it dissipates via Hawking radiation.

== See also ==
- IC 1101
- Phoenix A
- TON 618
