= Thopia =

Thopia may refer to:

- Thopia family, one of the most powerful Albanian feudal families in the Late Middle Ages
  - Tanusio Thopia
  - Karl Thopia
  - George Thopia
  - Helena Thopia
  - Niketa Thopia
  - Andrea I Thopia
  - Andrea II Thopia
  - Tanush Thopia
  - Voisava Thopia
  - Dominic Thopia

== See also ==
- Topia (disambiguation)
