= Tanca (disambiguation) =

Tanca is a sixth-century French Roman Catholic saint

Tanca may also refer to:

People

- Andrew Tanca
- Juan Tanca Marengo, Ecuadorian physician

Places

- Tanča Gora
- Tanca Marchese
- Tanca Tanca

== See also ==
- Tanka (disambiguation)
