= NGC 7139 =

Planetary nebula in the constellation Cepheus

Emission nebula
- Planetary nebula
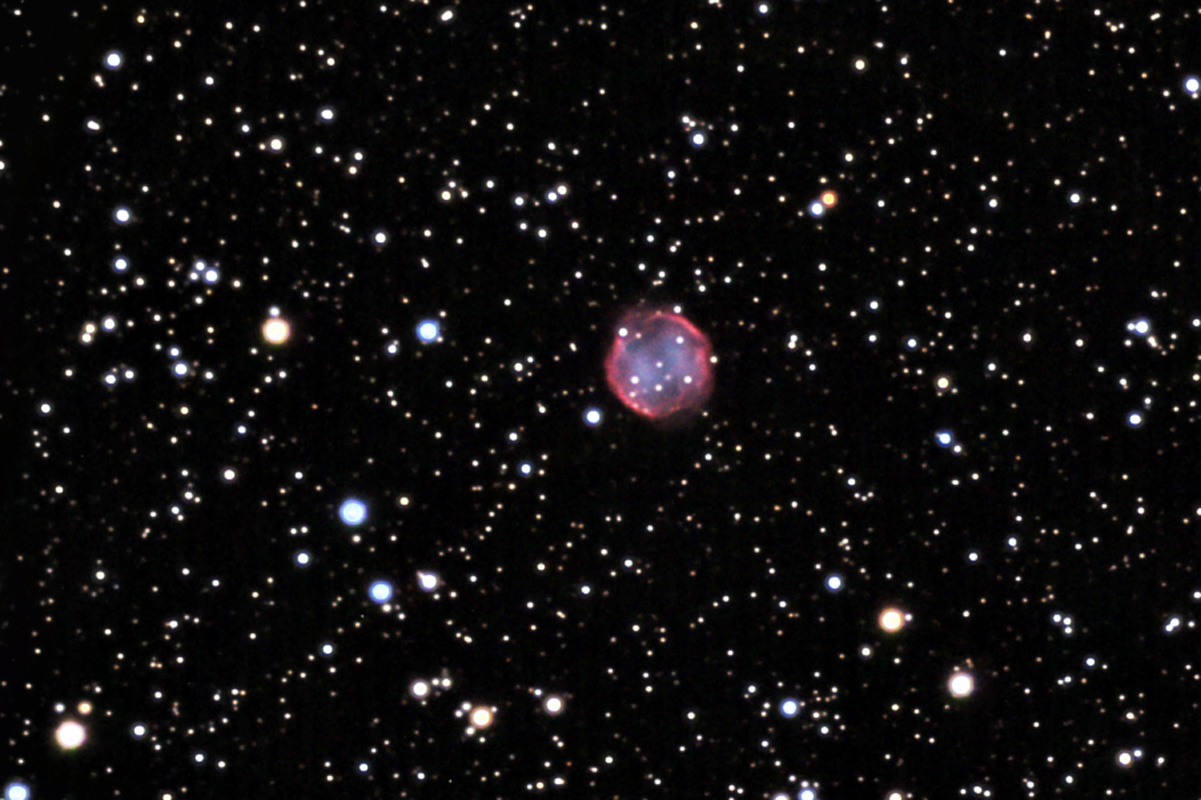
- NGC 7139

Observation data: J2000 epoch
- Right ascension: 21^{h} 46^{m} 08.586^{s}
- Declination: +63° 47′ 29.45″
- Apparent magnitude (V): 13
- Constellation: Cepheus

NGC 7139 is a planetary nebula located in the constellation of Cepheus. It was discovered on November 5, 1787, by astronomer William Herschel.

== See also ==
- List of NGC objects
- Planetary nebulae
