= Graffias =

Graffias is a traditional name for several stars in the constellations between Scorpius and Libra.

It can refer to:

- β Sco; later transferred from ξ Sco.
- ξ Sco (also 51 Lib); applied to Bayer's star list in his Uranometria.
  - Burritt's ξ of Libra; applied to Burritt's star map.
  - ζ Sco; applied to Becvar's star list, as Grafias.

== See also ==
- List of stars in Libra
- List of stars in Scorpius
