= Toka =

Toka may refer to:

== Places ==
- Toka, the Hungarian name for Toaca, Romania village, Hodac Commune, Mureș County, Romania
- Toka Gorge, in Norway
- Toka, Guyana, a village in Guyana
- Toka, a village near Nevasa in Maharashtra, India

== People ==
- Tokaleya, people indigenous to the area surrounding Victoria Falls

=== Given name ===
- Toka Gaudi (born 1972), Papua New Guinean cricketer
- Toka Natua (born 1991), rugby union and rugby league footballer

=== Surname ===
- Gaudi Toka (born 1994), Papua New Guinean cricketer
- Khertek Anchimaa-Toka (1912–2008), Tuvan politician
- Matt Toka, American musician
- Salchak Toka (1901–1973), Tuvan politician
- Taunga Toka, Cook Islands politician

== Characters ==
- Tokka and Rahzar, characters in the "Teenage Mutant Ninja Turtles" universe
- Tōka Kamiazuma, protagonist of Tōka Gettan
- Toka Heremaia, Shortland Street character
- Toka Yada (矢田 桃花), character from the Assassination Classroom manga and anime series

== Other uses ==
- Toka (instrument), an instrument of Assam, India used in Bihu dance
- Toka, a sports game played by women of the Tohono O'odham people
- Toka (company), a French video game company

== See also ==
- Tonka (disambiguation)
- Toska (disambiguation)
- Tova (disambiguation)
