= Tosia =

Tosia is a Polish feminine given name that is a diminutive form of Antonina or Antonia used in Poland. Notable people with this name include the following:

== Given name ==
- Tosia Altman (1919–1943), Polish resistance courier and smuggler
- Tosia Malamud (1923–2008), Ukrainian sculptor

== See also ==
- Tonia (name)
- Topia (disambiguation)
- Tosa (disambiguation)
- Tosca (disambiguation)
- Tosin (given name)
