= Thankam =

Thankam may refer to:

- "Ente Thankam", a short story written by Vaikom Muhammad Basheer re-published under the name "Thankam"
- Thankam (film), a 2023 Indian Malayalam-language film
- Kumari Thankam, Indian actress
- Pala Thankam, Indian actress

== See also ==
- Tanka (disambiguation)
- Thangka, a type of painting from Tibet
- Kalanjukittiya Thankam, a 1964 Indian Malayalam-language film
