= Honky Tonk (disambiguation) =

A honky-tonk is a type of bar. The phrase may also refer to:

== Films ==
- Honky Tonk (1929 film), a musical drama starring Sophie Tucker
- Honky Tonk (1941 film), a Western starring Clark Gable and Lana Turner
- Honky Tonk (1974 film), a Western directed by Don Taylor

== Music ==
- Honky Tonk (album), 2013 album by Son Volt
- Honky Tonk (Dude Mowrey album)
- "Honky Tonk" (instrumental), a 1956 rhythm and blues instrumental
- Honky tonk, the style of music played in a honky tonk, a subgenre of country music
- Honky-tonk piano or tack piano, a piano modified to produce a more percussive sound
- "Honky Tonk", a track from the Miles Davis album The Cellar Door Sessions

== See also ==
- Honky Tonk Angel (disambiguation)
- Honky Tonk Man (disambiguation)
- Honky Tonk Women a song (1969) by The Rolling Stones
