= Tosa =

Tosa or TOSA may refer to:

== Places ==
- Tosa, Kōchi a city in Kōchi Prefecture, Japan
- Tosa, Kōchi (town), a town in Kōchi Prefecture, Japan
- Tosa District, Kōchi
- Tosa province and Tosa Domain, now known as Kōchi Prefecture
- Wauwatosa, known to locals as Tosa, a city in Wisconsin

== People with the surname ==
- Kōji Tosa (土佐 浩司; born 1955), Japanese shogi player
- Tosa Mitsunobu
- Tosa Mitsuoki
- Reiko Tosa, marathon runner
- Tadao Tosa (土佐 忠雄; born 1942), Japanese diver

== Other uses ==
- Tosa dialect
- Tosa-mi, or tataki, a cooking technique
- Tosa (dog), a Japanese dogfighting breed
- Tosa-class battleship of Imperial Japan
  - Japanese battleship Tosa, the lead ship of the Tosa class
- TOSA (bus), a concept electric bus
- The Sharp Zaurus model SL-6000

== See also ==
- Cima Tosa, a peak in the Brenta Dolomites
- Tosa d'Alp, or La Tosa, in the Pyrenees
- Tosa corner or hairpin of the San Marino Grand Prix race track
- Tosia, name
- Toska (disambiguation)
- TOSA (Test on Software Applications), a certification of digital literacy, officially recognized in the United States (Florida, Oklahoma, South Carolina, Virginia, Washington, and Wyoming), Canada, the United Kingdom, France and the Netherlands.
