= Tuska =

Tuska may refer to:

- Tuska, Iran, a village in Mazandaran Province, Iran
- Tuska Open Air Metal Festival, in Helsinki
- Tuska, a deity in the game RuneScape
- Clarence D. Tuska, co-founder of the American Radio Relay League

== See also ==
- Toska (disambiguation)
