= V381 Cephei =

Triple star system in the constellation Cepheus

- Location of V381 Cephei (circled)

Observation data Epoch J2000.0 Equinox J2000.0
- Constellation: Cepheus
- V381 Cephei A
- Right ascension: 21^{h} 19^{m} 15.6852^{s}
- Declination: +58° 37′ 24.624″
- Apparent magnitude (V): 5.51 - 5.71
- V381 Cephei B
- Right ascension: 21^{h} 19^{m} 16.1020^{s}
- Declination: +58° 37′ 27.844″
- Apparent magnitude (V): 9.23

Characteristics
- Spectral type: M1epIb + B
- U−B color index: 0.00
- B−V color index: +1.34
- Variable type: Lc

Astrometry

A
Radial velocity (R_{v})	−14.10 km/s
Proper motion (μ)	RA: −1.893 mas/yr Dec.: −4.751 mas/yr
Parallax (π)	0.5546±0.1793 mas
Distance	approx. 6,000 ly (approx. 1,800 pc)
Absolute magnitude (M_{V})	−5.2

B
Proper motion (μ)	RA: −2.490±0.025 mas/yr Dec.: −3.704±0.031 mas/yr
Parallax (π)	1.1735±0.0171 mas
Distance	2,780 ± 40 ly (850 ± 10 pc)

Details

Aa
Mass	7.2 - 16 M_{☉}
Radius	977 R_{☉}
Luminosity	178,000 L_{☉}
Temperature	3,745±170 K

Ab
Mass	13 M_{☉}

B
Mass	7.1 M_{☉}
Radius	3.4 R_{☉}
Luminosity	1,487 L_{☉}
Surface gravity (log g)	4.18 cgs
Temperature	19,965 K
Metallicity [Fe/H]	−0.30 dex
Rotational velocity (v sin i)	42.8 km/s
Age	49.1 Myr

Other designations
- V381 Cephei, HR 8164, HIP 105259, BD+58°2249, ADS 14864, 2MASS J21191567+5837246, WDS J21193+5837
- A: HD 203338
- B: HD 203339

Database references
- A
- B

V381 Cephei (HR 8164) is a triple star system in the northern constellation of Cepheus. Its apparent magnitude is slightly variable between 5.5 and 5.7. It is faintly visible to the naked eye under good observing conditions.

The star was discovered to be a variable star in 1991, by Elaine M. Halbedel. It was given its variable star designation, V381 Cephei, in 1995.

== System ==
V381 Cephei is a visual double star with components A and B separated by 4.6". The primary is HD 203338 and the secondary is the magnitude 9.2 HD 203339.

HD 203338 is itself a spectroscopic binary with components Aa and Ab orbiting every 280 years. It forms a VV Cephei-type binary system with a hot companion which is accreting mass from the primary. The long period means that it exhibits fewer peculiarities than other VV Cephei binaries.

== Properties ==
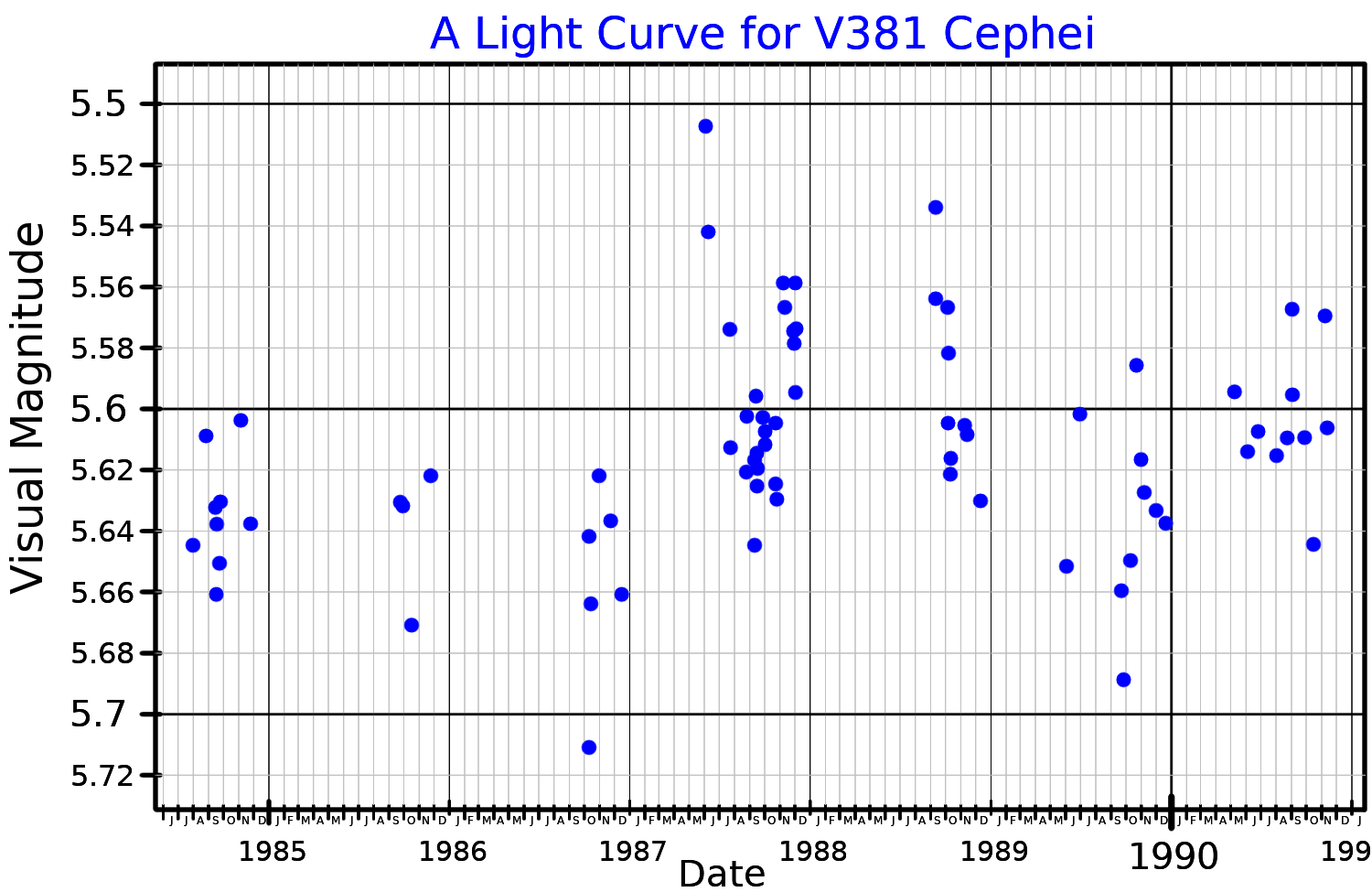
A visual band light curve for V381 Cephei, adapted from Halbedel (1991)

Component Aa is a red supergiant and its close companion is a B2 main sequence star. The supergiant is a pulsating variable with a small amplitude and poorly defined period. It is generally given spectral class qualifiers indicating peculiarities and emission, which may be associated with the disc around the hot secondary.

Component B, HD 203339, is a B3 main sequence star with a mass around 11 M_{☉}.
