= SSTGFLS J222557+601148 =

Nebula in the constellation Cepheus

Emission nebula
- Planetary nebula

Observation data: J2000.0 epoch
- Right ascension: 22^{h} 25^{m} 57^{s}
- Declination: 60° 11.8′
- Distance: 2000–3000 pc
- Constellation: Cepheus
- Notable features: Originally misclassified as a supernova remnant
- Designations: EQ J222557+601158

SSTGFLS J222557+601148 is a planetary nebula in the constellation Cepheus. Located between 2000 and 3000 parsecs distant from Earth, it was originally classified in 2006 as a supernova remnant. Thought to be the first supernova remnant initially detected in infrared wavelengths, the spectrum and properties of the object did not match up well with that of a typical supernova remnant, and it was reclassified as a planetary nebula in 2010. A candidate central star has been identified, with an apparent infrared magnitude of 22.4.
