= 3C 61.1 =

Seyfert galaxy in the constellation Cepheus

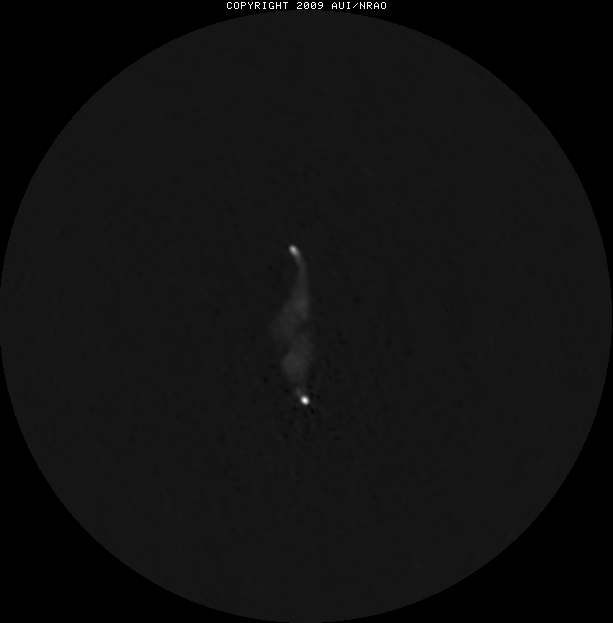

Observation data (J2000 epoch)
- Constellation: Cepheus
- Right ascension: 02^{h} 22^{m} 36.2^{s}
- Declination: +86° 19′ 08″
- Redshift: 0.184
- Distance: ~ 740 Mpc
- Apparent magnitude (V): 18.95

Characteristics
- Type: Sy2

Other designations
- LEDA 2832137, 8C 0210+860, QSO B0210+860

3C 61.1 is a Seyfert galaxy located in the constellation Cepheus.
