= Krüger 60 =

Binary star system in the constellation Cepheus

Krüger 60 A/B
- Location of Krüger 60 in the constellation Cepheus

Observation data Epoch J2000 Equinox ICRS
- Constellation: Cepheus
- Krüger 60 A
- Right ascension: 22^{h} 27^{m} 59.55755^{s}
- Declination: +57° 41′ 42.0806″
- Apparent magnitude (V): 9.93±0.03
- Krüger 60 B
- Right ascension: 22^{h} 27^{m} 59.79560^{s}
- Declination: +57° 41′ 49.7468″
- Apparent magnitude (V): 10.3 – 11.4

Characteristics
- Spectral type: M3V/M4V
- Variable type: None/Flare star

Astrometry

Krüger 60 A
| Proper motion (μ) | RA: −725.227 mas/yr Dec.: −223.461 mas/yr |
| Parallax (π) | 249.3926±0.1653 mas |
| Distance | 13.078 ± 0.009 ly (4.010 ± 0.003 pc) |

Krüger 60 B
| Proper motion (μ) | RA: −934.098 mas/yr Dec.: −686.244 mas/yr |
| Parallax (π) | 249.9668±0.7414 mas |
| Distance | 13.05 ± 0.04 ly (4.00 ± 0.01 pc) |

Orbit
| Primary | Krüger 60 A |
| Name | Krüger 60 B |
| Period (P) | 45.13+0.44 −0.43 yr |
| Semi-major axis (a) | 2.45±0.02" (9.82 AU (Note: Semi-major axis in AU = $\frac{semimajor\ axis\ in\ seconds}{parallax\ in\ seconds}\ {{=}}\ \frac{2.45}{0.2499668}$ = 9.82 AU; as the eccentricity is 0.41, the distance fluctuates between 59% and 141% of that, roughly from 5.77 AU to 13.9 AU.)) |
| Eccentricity (e) | 0.4131+0.0031 −0.0032 |
| Inclination (i) | 165.41+0.72 −0.71° |
| Longitude of the node (Ω) | 152.6+3.3 −3.9° |
| Periastron epoch (T) | 56,944+12 −11 MJD |
| Argument of periastron (ω) (primary) | 208.2+2.8 −3.3° |

Details

Krüger 60 A
| Mass | 0.271±0.010 M_{☉} |
| Radius | 0.301±0.015 R_{☉} |
| Luminosity | 0.00983±0.00025 L_{☉} |
| Habitable zone inner limit | 0.103 AU |
| Habitable zone outer limit | 0.201 AU |
| Temperature | 3,342±111 K |
| Metallicity | –0.04 |

Krüger 60 B
| Mass | 0.176±0.007 M_{☉} |
| Radius | 0.209±0.017 R_{☉} |
| Luminosity | 0.00393±0.00016 L_{☉} |
| Habitable zone inner limit | 0.067 AU |
| Habitable zone outer limit | 0.129 AU |
| Temperature | 3,097±111 K |

Other designations
- BD+56°2783, GJ 860 A/B, HD 239960, HIP 110893, ADS 15972, G 232-075, LHS 3814/3815

Database references
| SIMBAD | The system |
- A
- B

Krüger 60 (DO Cephei) is a binary star system located 13.1 light-years (4.0 parsecs) from Earth, being one of the nearest stars. It is made up of a pair of red dwarf stars orbiting each other every 45 years.

== Description ==
The larger, primary star is designated component A, while the secondary, smaller star is labeled component B. Component A has about 27% of the Sun's mass and 30% of the Sun's radius. Component B has about 18% of the Sun's mass and 21% of the Sun's radius.

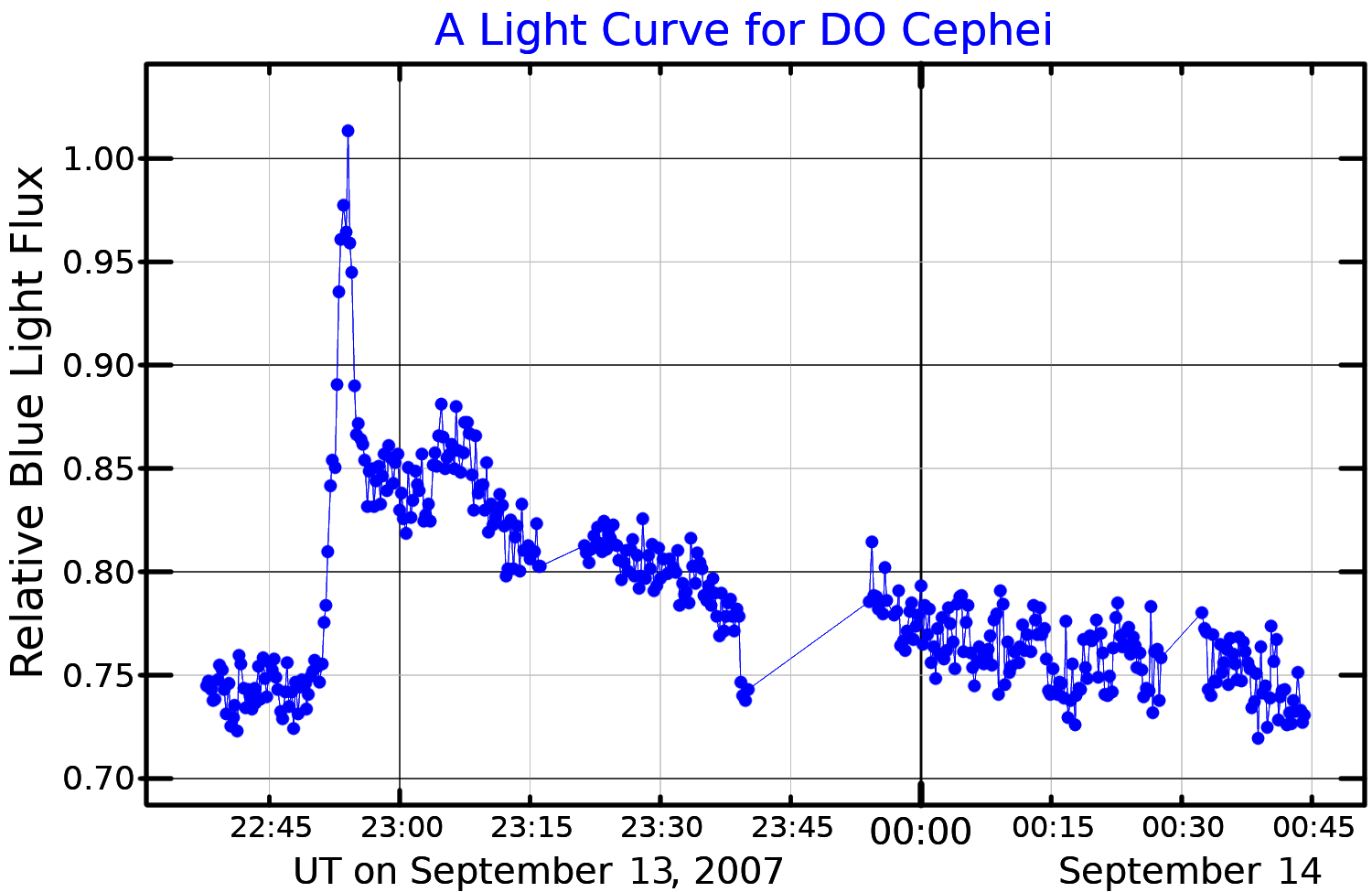
A blue band light curve for a flare on DO Cephei, adapted from Dal (2020)

In 1951, Peter van de Kamp and Sarah Lee Lippincott announced that component B is a flare star. It was given the variable star designation "DO Cephei". Flares lasting as long as one hour have been recorded.

This system is orbiting through the Milky Way at a distance from the core that varies from 7–9 kpc (23–29kly) with an orbital eccentricity of 0.126–0.130. The closest approach to the Sun will occur in about 88,600 years when this system will come within 1.95 parsecs (6.4 ly).

Considering the orbit of the members of Krüger 60, detecting an exoplanet through radial velocity could prove difficult, as its orbit would likely be inclined only 13 degrees from our point of view (like its stars), and create 1/5th as strong a radial velocity signal as an exoplanet orbiting edge-on from the point of view of the Solar System.

== Name ==
In 1890 Adalbert Krueger published a part of the AGK catalogue with stars with declination between +55 and +65. He noted which stars appeared to be double. Sherburne Wesley Burnham (1894) observed 67 of these candidate double stars, among which number 60 from his list, which later was called Kruger 60 (star 13170 from the catalogue of Krueger).
