= Elephant trunk (disambiguation) =

An elephant trunk or elephant's trunk is the proboscis/nose of an elephant.

The phrase may also refer to:

- Elephant trunk (astronomy), a type of formation of interstellar matter
  - Elephant's Trunk Nebula, a specific nebula
- Elephant Trunk Hill, a landmark and tourist attraction in Guilin, Guangxi, China
- Funnel cloud
- Elephant trunk snake, a species of snake

== See also ==
- Elephant's toothpaste, a foam produced by the chemical decomposition of hydrogen peroxide; a popular children's science experiment
