= Trunks =

Trunks may refer to:

- Trunks (clothing)
- Trunks (Dragon Ball), a fictional character
- Trunks (album)

== See also ==
- Trunk (disambiguation)
