= La Tosca (disambiguation) =

La Tosca is an 1887 drama by Victorien Sardou.

La Tosca may also refer to:

- La Tosca (1909 film), a French film
- La Tosca (1918 film), a lost American drama silent film
- La Tosca (1973 film), an Italian comedy-drama film
