= Trunk (surname) =

Trunk is a German language surname, derived from a nickname for a heavy drinker. Notable people with the surname include:

- Eddie Trunk (1964), American music historian, radio personality, talk show host, and author
- Gustav Trunk (1871–1936), German politician
- Jonny Trunk, English writer, broadcaster and DJ
- Herman Trunk (1894–1963), American painter
- Isaiah Trunk (1905–1981), Polish-American historian
- Penelope Trunk (born 1966), American businesswoman, author, and blogger
- Peter Trunk (1936–1973), German jazz double-bassist
- Richard Trunk (1879–1968), German composer, pianist, conductor, and critic
