= Toska, Iran =

Coordinates: 36°32′43″N 51°56′58″E

Toska تسكا
- Village
- Interactive map of Toska
- Country: Iran
- Province: Mazandaran
- County: Babol
- Bakhsh: Bandpey-ye Gharbi
- Rural District: Khvosh Rud

Population (2006)
  - Total: 491
- Time zone: UTC+3:30 (IRST)
  - Summer (DST): UTC+4:30 (IRDT)

Toska (Persian: تسكا, also Romanized as Toskā) is a village in Khvosh Rud Rural District, Bandpey-ye Gharbi District, Babol County, Mazandaran Province, Iran. At the 2006 census, its population was 491, in 113 families.
