= Tonk, Raebareli =

Tonk
- Village
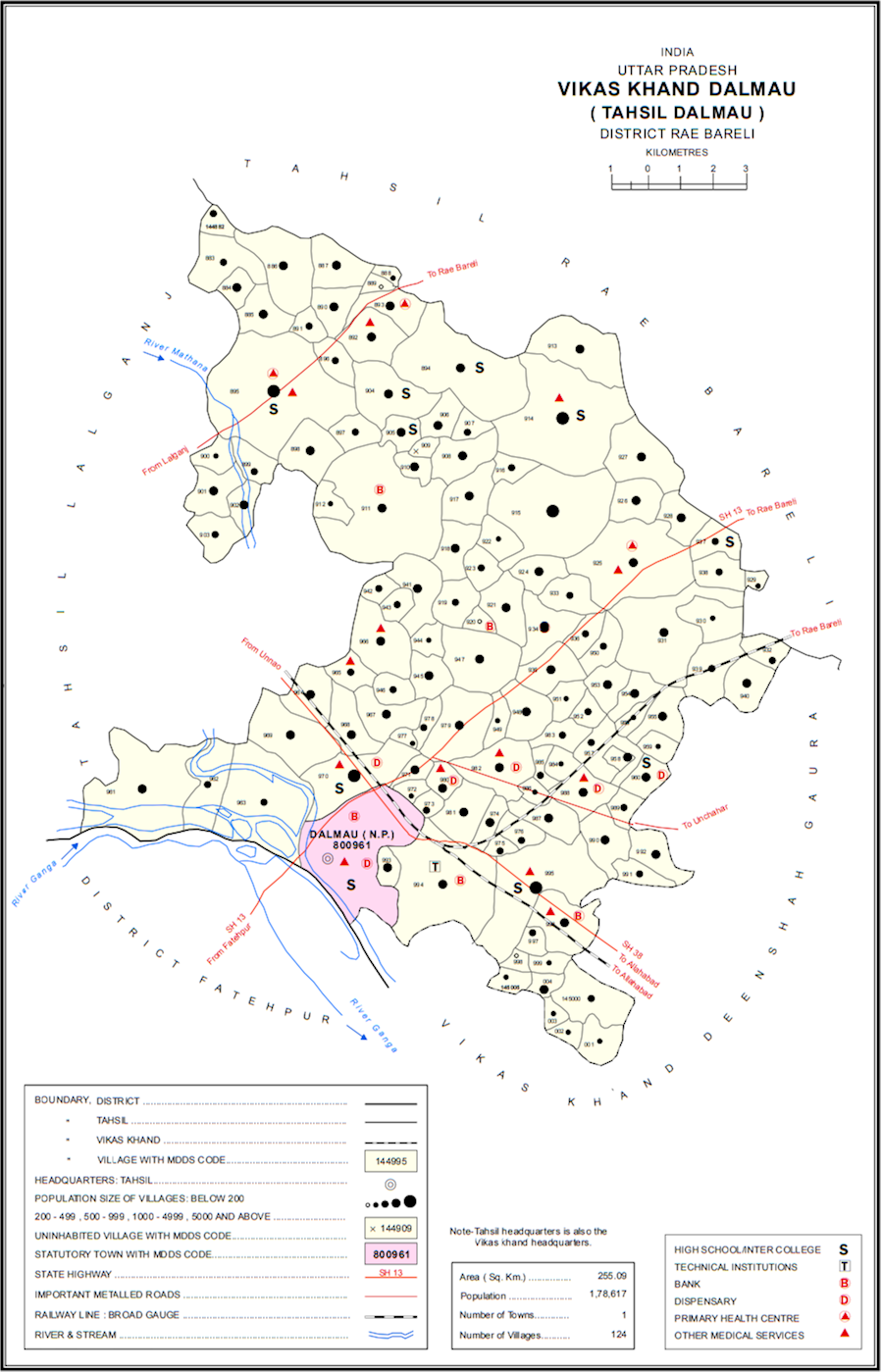
- Map showing Tonk (#950) in Dalmau CD block

- Location in Uttar Pradesh, India
- Coordinates: 26.114515°N 81.120535°E
- Country India: India
- State: Uttar Pradesh
- District: Raebareli

Area
  - Total: 1.308 km^{2} (0.505 sq mi)

Population (2011)
  - Total: 642
  - Density: 491/km^{2} (1,270/sq mi)

Languages
  - Official: Hindi
- Time zone: UTC+5:30 (IST)
- Vehicle registration: UP-35

Tonk is a village in Dalmau block of Rae Bareli district, Uttar Pradesh, India. It is located 10 km from Dalmau, the block headquarters. As of 2011, it has a population of 642 people, in 120 households. It has no schools and no healthcare facilities.

== History ==
After the Indian Rebellion of 1857, the village of Tonk was granted to Raja Mahesh Narain Singh of Parhat in Pratapgarh district.

The 1961 census recorded Tonk as comprising 2 hamlets, with a total population of 357 people (182 male and 175 female), in 50 households and 47 physical houses. The area of the village was given as 332 acres.

The 1981 census recorded Tonk as having a population of 383 people, in 67 households, and having an area of 129.50 hectares. The main staple foods were listed as wheat and rice.
