= Honky Tonk Angel =

Honky Tonk Angel may refer to:

Albums:

- Honky Tonk Angel (Ellen McIlwaine album), a 1971 album by Ellen McIlwaine
- Honky Tonk Angel (Conway Twitty album), a 1974 album by Conway Twitty
- Honky Tonk Angel (Patty Loveless album), a 1988 album by Patty Loveless
- Honky Tonk Angels, a 1993 country album by Dolly Parton, Loretta Lynn, and Tammy Wynette
- Honky Tonk Angel, a 2009 album by the Topp Twins

Songs:

- "The Wild Side of Life", a 1952 country song containing the lyric "I didn't know God made honky tonk angels"
- "It Wasn't God Who Made Honky Tonk Angels", a 1952 country song, written in answer to "The Wild Side of Life"
- "There's a Honky Tonk Angel (Who'll Take Me Back In)", a 1974 song by Conway Twitty, later covered by Cliff Richard and Elvis Presley
