= Prawn Nebula =

Emission nebula in the constellation Scorpius

Emission nebula
- H II region
- Detailed view of the Prawn Nebula

Observation data: J2000 epoch
- Right ascension: 16^{h} 56^{m} 54.66861^{s}
- Declination: −40° 30′ 44.4441″
- Distance: 6,000 ly
- Apparent magnitude (V): +7.31
- Apparent dimensions (V): 90'
- Constellation: Scorpius

Physical characteristics
- Radius: 125 ly
- Designations: HD 152723, CSI-40 10986 21, Hbg 1258, SAO 227479, ALS 3854, CSV 102812, HIC 82936, SKY# 30546, CD-40 10986, GC 22819, HIP 82936, TD1 19710, CEL 4464, GCRV 9755, IC 4628, UBV 14329, CGO 429, GEN# +1.00152723J, LS 3854, uvby98 100152723 ABC, Cl Trumpler 24 405, GOS G344.81+01.61 01, MCW 1270, CPC 0 15594, GSC 07872-02169, NSV 8060, CPD-40 7650, GUM 56, PPM 322447

Prawn Nebula, also known as IC 4628, is an emission nebula located in the Sagittarius Arm of the Milky Way, around 6,000 light-years from Earth in the constellation Scorpius. It forms part of the tail of the "False Comet" anchored by the bright open cluster NGC 6231.

== Gallery ==
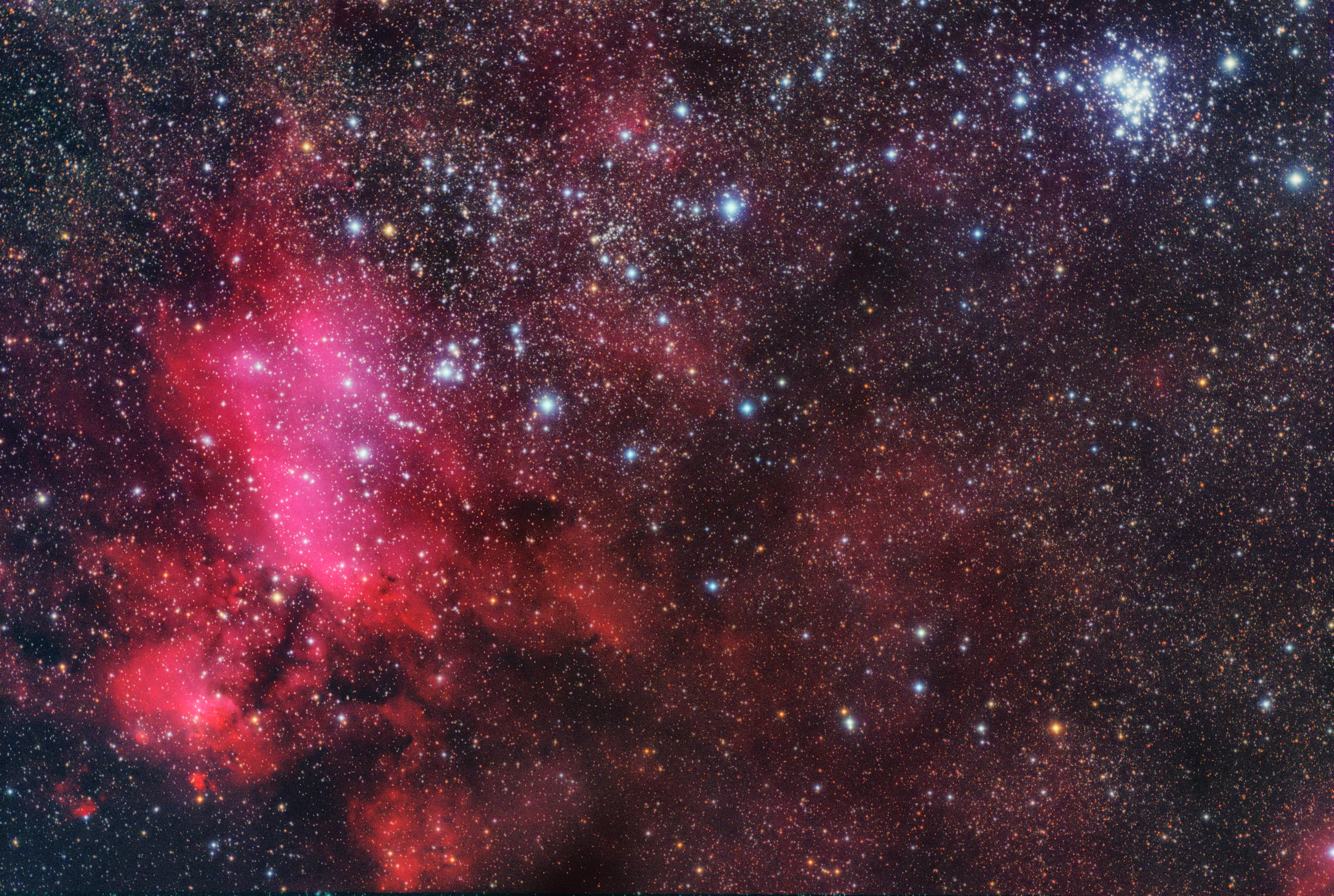
The Prawn Nebula with open cluster NGC 6231

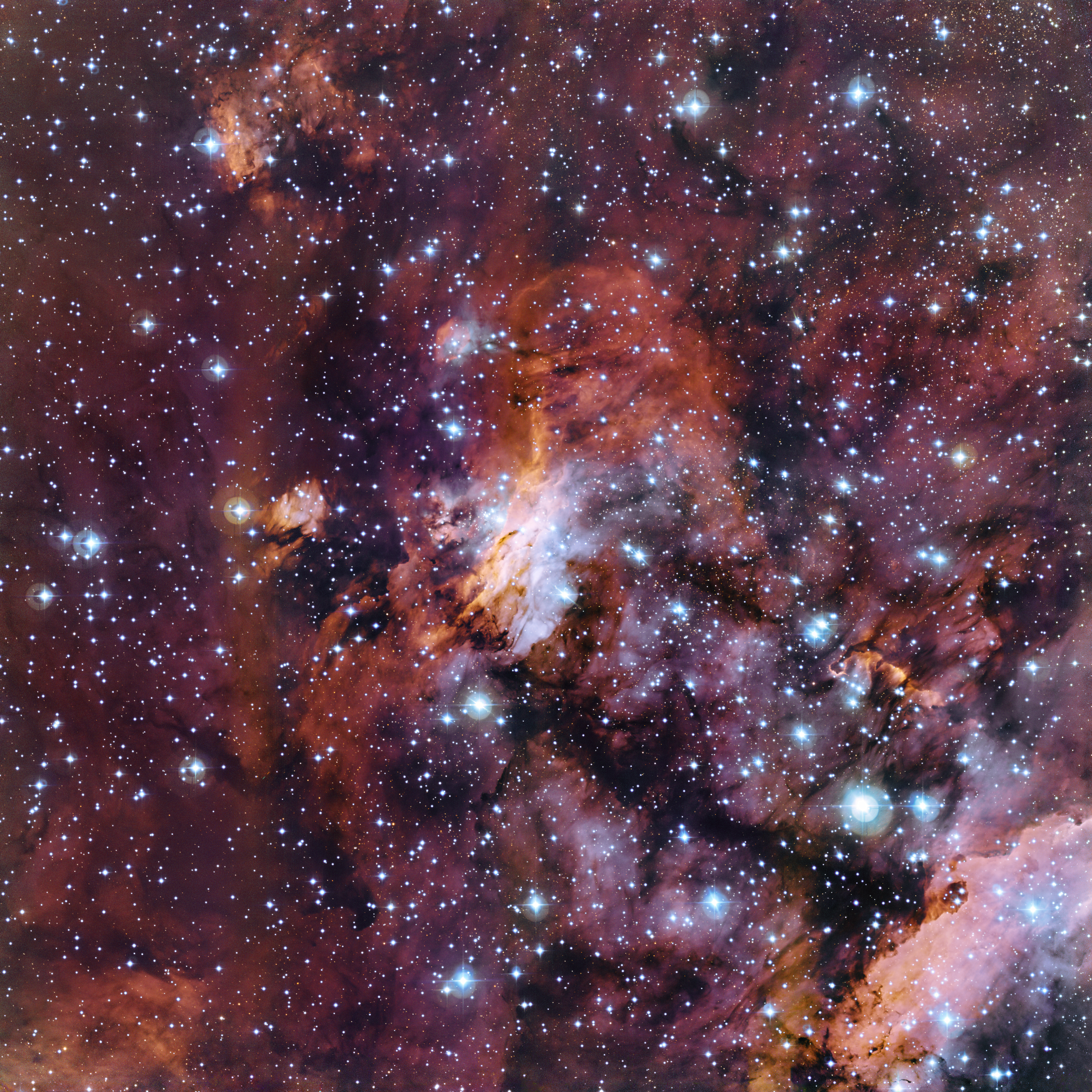
The Prawn Nebula in close-up.
