= NGC 6231 =

Open cluster in the constellation of Scorpius

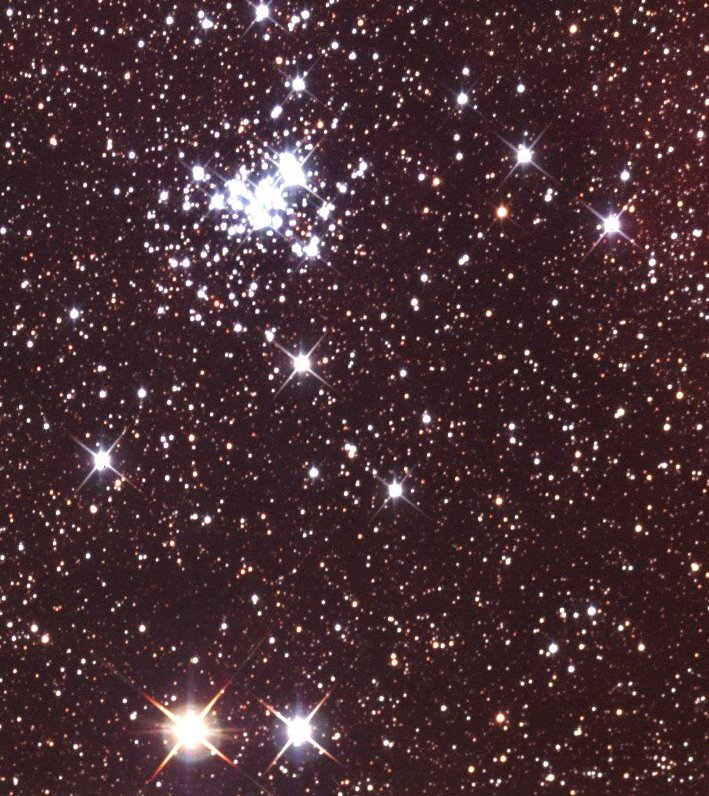
- NGC 6231 (top) with Zeta2 and Zeta1 Scorpii (bottom)

Observation data (J2000.0 epoch)
- Right ascension: 16^{h} 54.2^{m}
- Declination: −41° 48′
- Distance: 5,600±400 ly (1,700±130 pc)
- Apparent magnitude (V): 2.6
- Apparent dimensions (V): 15.0′

Physical characteristics
- Estimated age: 2–7 million years
- Other designations: NGC 6171, Caldwell 76, Collinder 315, Melotte 153, De Cheseaux 9, Dunlop 499, Ha. I.7, Lacaille II.13

Associations
- Constellation: Scorpius

NGC 6231 (also known as Caldwell 76, the Baby Scorpion Cluster, or the Crocodile Cluster) is an open cluster in the southern sky located half a degrees north of Zeta Scorpii. NGC 6231 is part of a swath of young, bluish stars in the constellation Scorpius known as the Scorpius OB1 association. The star Zeta^{1} (HR 6262) is a member of this association, while its brighter apparent partner, Zeta^{2} (HR 6271), is only 150 ly from Earth and so is not a member.

This cluster is estimated to be about 2–7 million years old, and is approaching the Solar System at 22 km/s. The cluster and association lie in the neighboring Sagittarius Arm of the Milky Way. Zeta^{1} Scorpii (spectral type O8 and magnitude 4.71.) is the brightest star in the association, and one of the most radiant stars known in the galaxy. NGC 6231 was used to measure the binary fraction of B-type stars: 52%±8%, indicating that B-type stars are commonly found in binary systems, but not as commonly as in O-type stars.

NGC 6231 also includes three Wolf-Rayet stars: HD 151932, HD 152270, and HD 152408.

== Discovery ==
The cluster was discovered by Giovanni Batista Hodierna before 1654. Hodierna listed it as Luminosae in his catalogue of deep sky observations. This catalogue was included in his book De Admirandis Coeli Characteribuse published in 1654 at Palermo. It was independently observed by other astronomers after Hodierna, including Edmond Halley (1678), Jean-Philippe de Cheseaux (1745–46), and Abbe Lacaille (1751–52).

== Common names ==
The cluster forms the head of the False Comet, a wider collection of stars from Scorpius OB1 running northward from Zeta Scorpii and NGC 6231 roughly halfway toward Mu Scorpii. The tail is formed by two clusters, Collinder 316 and Trumpler 24. Trumpler 24 is surrounded by the emission nebula IC 4628, also known as the Prawn Nebula, where the tail appears to fan out.

The cluster is also sometimes known as The Northern Jewel Box, due to its similar appearance to the NGC 4755, the Jewel Box cluster, which is further south in the sky.

== Chinese astronomy ==
In Chinese astronomy, NGC 6231 is usually identified as Shengong (Chinese: 神宮; pinyin: Shéngōng), a dressing room. (Note: Stellarium, citing Yi Shitong, 1981) In older sources, Shengong corresponds to the star Mu^{2} Scorpii, or another faint star or patch of stars nearby; the name has been adopted by the IAU Working Group on Star Names for the star HD 153072. Still other sources identify Shengong as Zeta Scorpii.

== Gallery ==
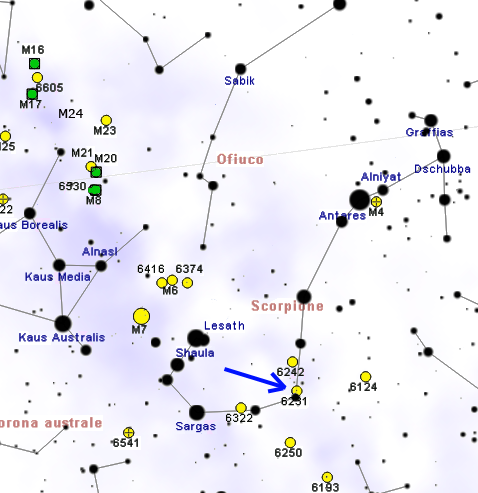
Map showing the location of NGC 6231

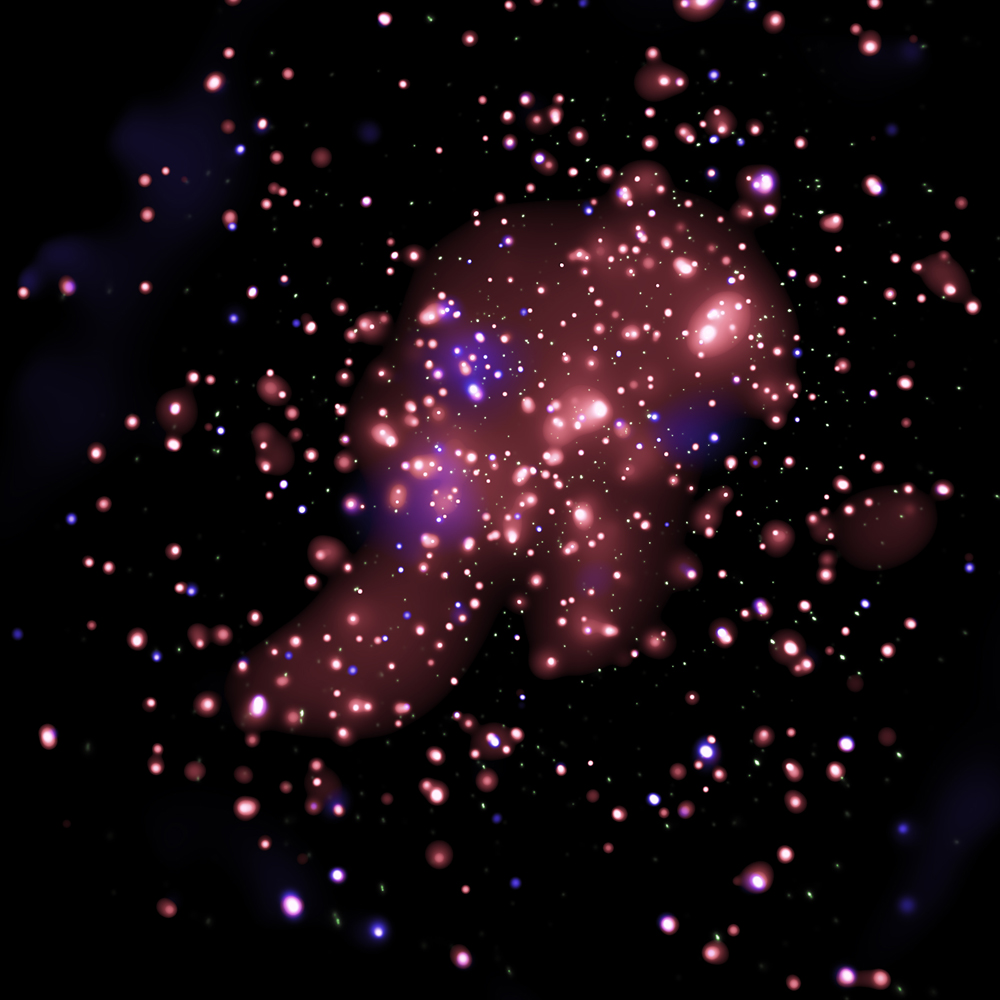
X-ray image from the Chandra X-ray Observatory

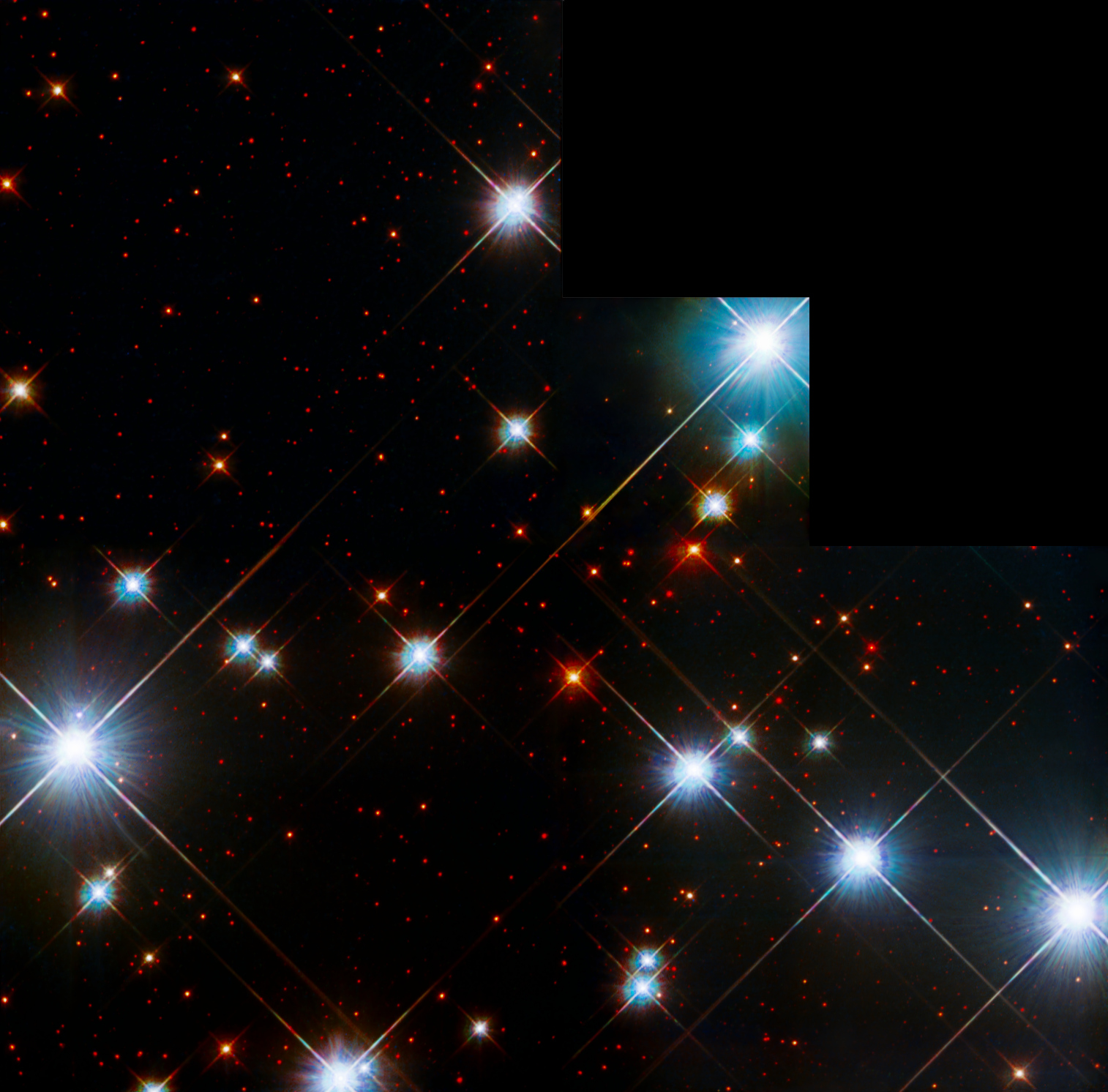
Close-up view from the Hubble Space Telescope
