= Zeta1 Scorpii =

Star in the constellation Scorpius

ζ^{1} Scorpii
- Location of ζ^{1} Scorpii (circled)

Observation data Epoch J2000.0 Equinox J2000.0 (ICRS)
- Constellation: Scorpius
- Right ascension: 16^{h} 53^{m} 59.72713^{s}
- Declination: −42° 21′ 43.3073″
- Apparent magnitude (V): 4.705 (4.66 to 4.86)

Characteristics
- Spectral type: B1.5 Ia^{+}
- U−B color index: −0.567
- B−V color index: +0.480
- Variable type: Luminous blue variable

Astrometry
Radial velocity (R_{v})	−26.0 km/s
Proper motion (μ)	RA: −0.094 mas/yr Dec.: −3.368 mas/yr
Parallax (π)	0.5855±0.1176 mas
Distance	approx. 6,000 ly (approx. 1,700 pc)
Absolute magnitude (M_{V})	−8.5

Details
Mass	36 to 53 M_{☉}
Radius	159+83 −34 R_{☉}
Luminosity (bolometric)	(1.0–1.6)×10^{6} L_{☉}
Surface gravity (log g)	1.7 cgs
Temperature	17,000–19,000 K
Rotational velocity (v sin i)	60 km/s
Age	6.5±0.1 Myr

Other designations
- ζ^{1} Sco, CD−42 11633, CPD−42 7545, GC 22730, HD 152236, HIP 82671, HR 6262, PPM 322342, SAO 227375.

Database references
SIMBAD	data

Zeta^{1} Scorpii (Zeta^{1} Sco, ζ^{1} Scorpii, ζ^{1} Sco) is a binary star in the constellation of Scorpius, composed by an B-type hypergiant star as the primary, and a secondary of which little is known. It has an apparent visual magnitude which varies between 4.66 and 4.86. It is a member of the Scorpius OB1 association, and potentially of the open star cluster NGC 6231, also known as the "Northern jewel box" cluster.

== Characteristics ==
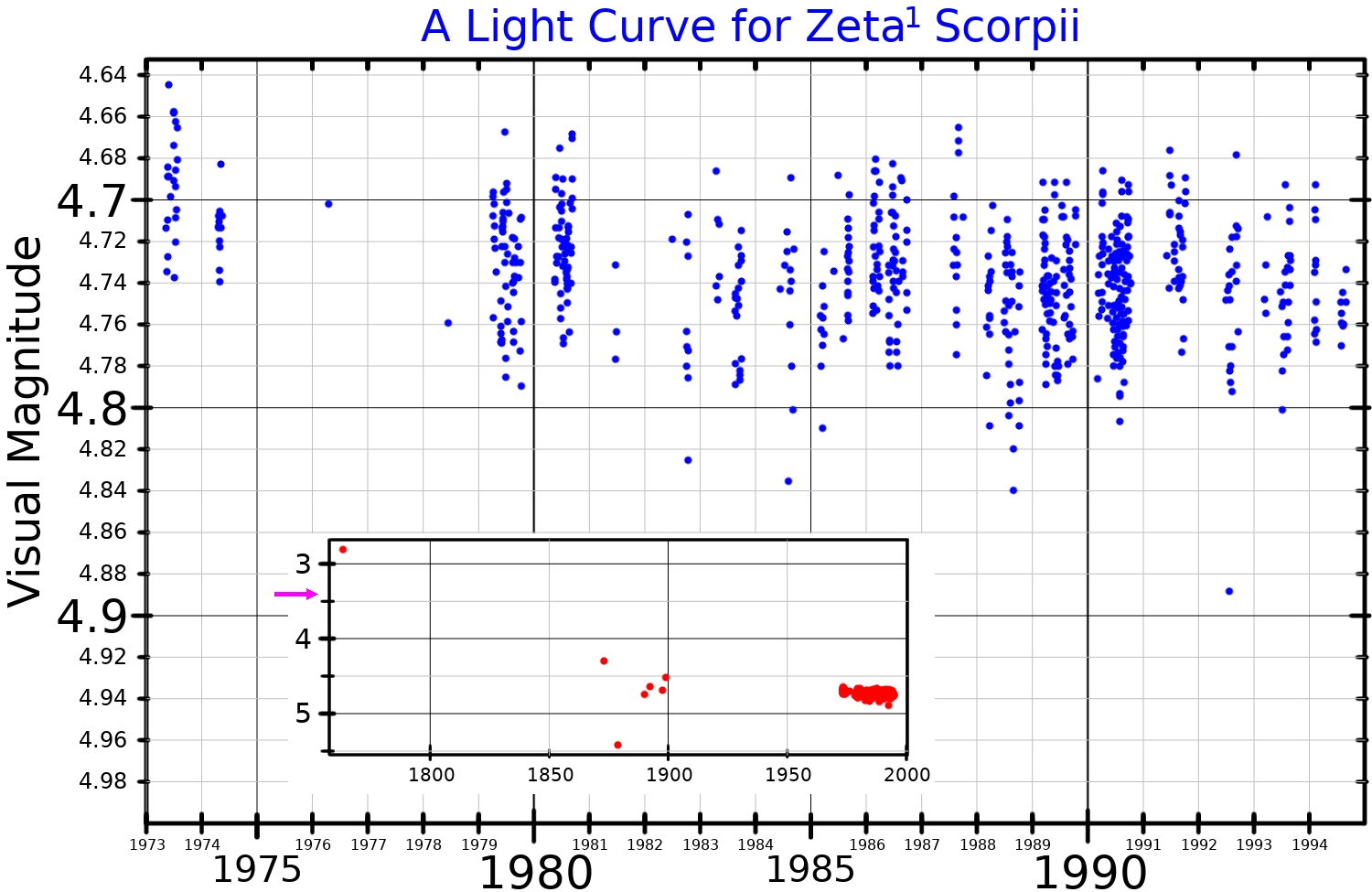
A visual band light curve for Zeta^{1} Scorpii, adapted from Sterken et al. (1997). The inset plot shows the long term variability. The purple arrow shows the brightness reported by al-Sufi in A.D. 962.

ζ^{1} Scorpii's primary is a luminous blue variable according to its luminosity and spectral appearance, yet it has not shown the characteristic types of variability, hence is classified as a dormant LBV. It has around 36 times as massive as the Sun and is one of the most luminous stars known in the Galaxy, with an estimated bolometric luminosity between 1 and 1.6 million times that of the Sun and a radius around 160 times that of the Sun. The stellar wind from this supergiant is expelling matter from the star at the rate of 1.55 × 10^{−6} solar masses per year, or roughly the equivalent to the Sun's mass every 640,000 years.

The secondary has been detected using interferometry, and its discovery was announced in 2021. As of 2021, it has an angular separation of 11.54±0.10 mas along a position angle of 283.22°+0.76°
−0.34°. It is 6.3 magnitudes fainter than the primary.

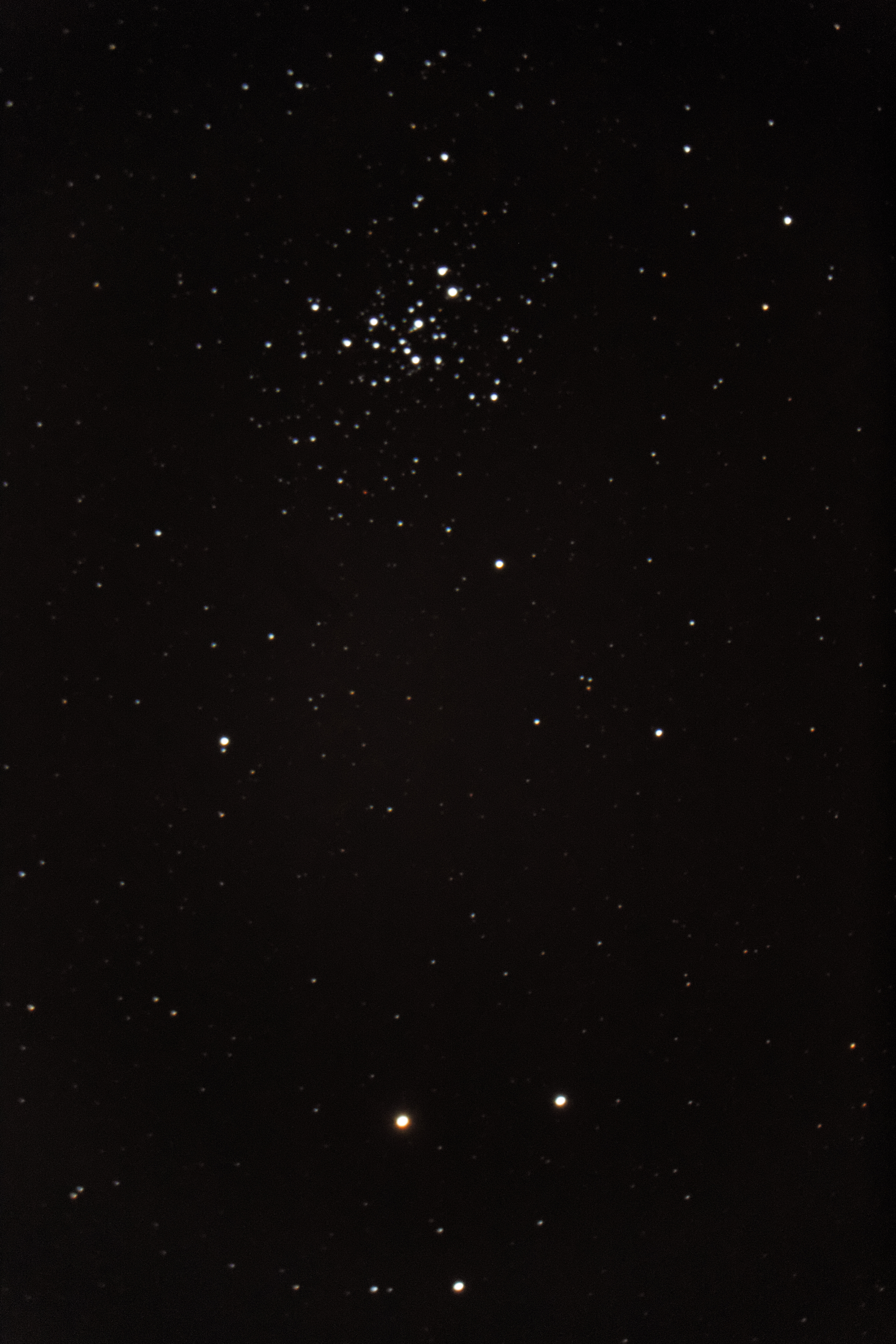
ζ^{1} Scorpii alongside the brighter ζ^{2} Scorpii to the south of NGC 6231

ζ^{1} Scorpii forms a naked eye double with ζ^{2} Scorpii, but the stars are merely coincidentally near in the line of sight from Earth. ζ^{2} is a mere 135 light-years distant and much less luminous in real terms. ζ^{1} Scorpii can also be distinguished from ζ^{2}, due to the latter's orange hue especially in long-exposure photographs.
