= Tanka (Peru) =

Mountain in Peru

- Location within Peru

Highest point
- Elevation: 4,783 m (15,692 ft)
- Coordinates: 15°04′19″S 72°24′05″W

Geography
- Location: Peru, Arequipa Region
- Parent range: Andes

Tanka (Aymara for tanka hat or biretta, Quechua for fork, Hispanicized spelling Tanca) is a 4,783-metre-high (15,692 ft) mountain in the Andes of Peru. It is situated in the Arequipa Region, Condesuyos Province, Cayarani District, in the southern extensions of the Wansu mountain range. Tanka lies at the Puma Ranra (or Sunqu P'allqa) valley, south of Allqa Q'awa.
