= Tonks =

Tonks is a surname. Notable people with the surname include:

- Adrian Tonks (1898–1919), British military aviator
- Benjamin Tonks (1832-1884), New Zealand politician
- Dick Tonks (born 1951), New Zealand rower
- Greig Tonks (born 1989), Scottish rugby union player
- Henry Tonks (1862-1937), English surgeon and artist
- Horace Norman Vincent Tonks (1891-1959), Anglican bishop
- Les Tonks (1942–2017), English rugby league footballer of the 1960s and 1970s
- Lewi Tonks (1897-1971), American quantum physicist
- Oliver Samuel Tonks (1874-1953), American art historian
- Rosemary Tonks (1932-2014), English author and poet
- Tony Tonks (born 1985), English rugby player

== Fictional characters ==
- Mr Tonks, the clown in Enid Blyton's The Circus Series.

=== Harry Potter franchise ===
- Andromeda Tonks
- Nymphadora Tonks
- Ted Tonks
