= Trosky =

Trosky may refer to:

- Trosky Castle, Semily, Liberec Region, Czech Republic
  - Rovensko pod Troskami
- Trosky, Minnesota, United States

== People with the surname ==
- Hal Trosky (1912–1979), baseball player
- Hal Trosky, Jr. (born 1936), Major League Baseball pitcher
- Jon Trosky (born 1980), American actor

== See also ==
- Leon Trotsky (1879–1940), Soviet politician and Marxist theorist
