= Zeta2 Scorpii =

Star in the constellation Scorpius

ζ2 Scorpii
- Location of ζ^{2} Scorpii (circled)

Observation data Epoch J2000.0 Equinox J2000.0 (ICRS)
- Constellation: Scorpius
- Right ascension: 16^{h} 54^{m} 35.00503^{s}
- Declination: −42° 21′ 40.7370″
- Apparent magnitude (V): 3.59 to 3.65

Characteristics
- Evolutionary stage: red giant branch
- Spectral type: K4 III
- U−B color index: +1.65
- B−V color index: +1.37
- R−I color index: +0.68

Astrometry
Radial velocity (R_{v})	−18.70±0.06 km/s
Proper motion (μ)	RA: −126.721 mas/yr Dec.: −228.837 mas/yr
Parallax (π)	24.2353±0.1985 mas
Distance	135 ± 1 ly (41.3 ± 0.3 pc)
Absolute magnitude (M_{V})	0.30±0.09

Details
Mass	1.18±0.15 M_{☉}
Radius	18.7±1.0 R_{☉}
Luminosity	130±20 L_{☉}
Surface gravity (log g)	2.10±0.07 cgs
Temperature	4,286±49 K
Metallicity [Fe/H]	−0.10±0.11 dex
Rotational velocity (v sin i)	2.30±0.45 km/s
Age	6.0±2.6 Gyr

Other designations
- ζ^{2} Sco, Zeta^{2} Scorpii, Zeta^{2} Sco, CD−42 11646, CPD−42 7549, GC 22751, HD 152334, HIP 82729, HR 6271, LTT 6737, NLTT 43744, PPM 322371, SAO 227402

Database references
SIMBAD	data

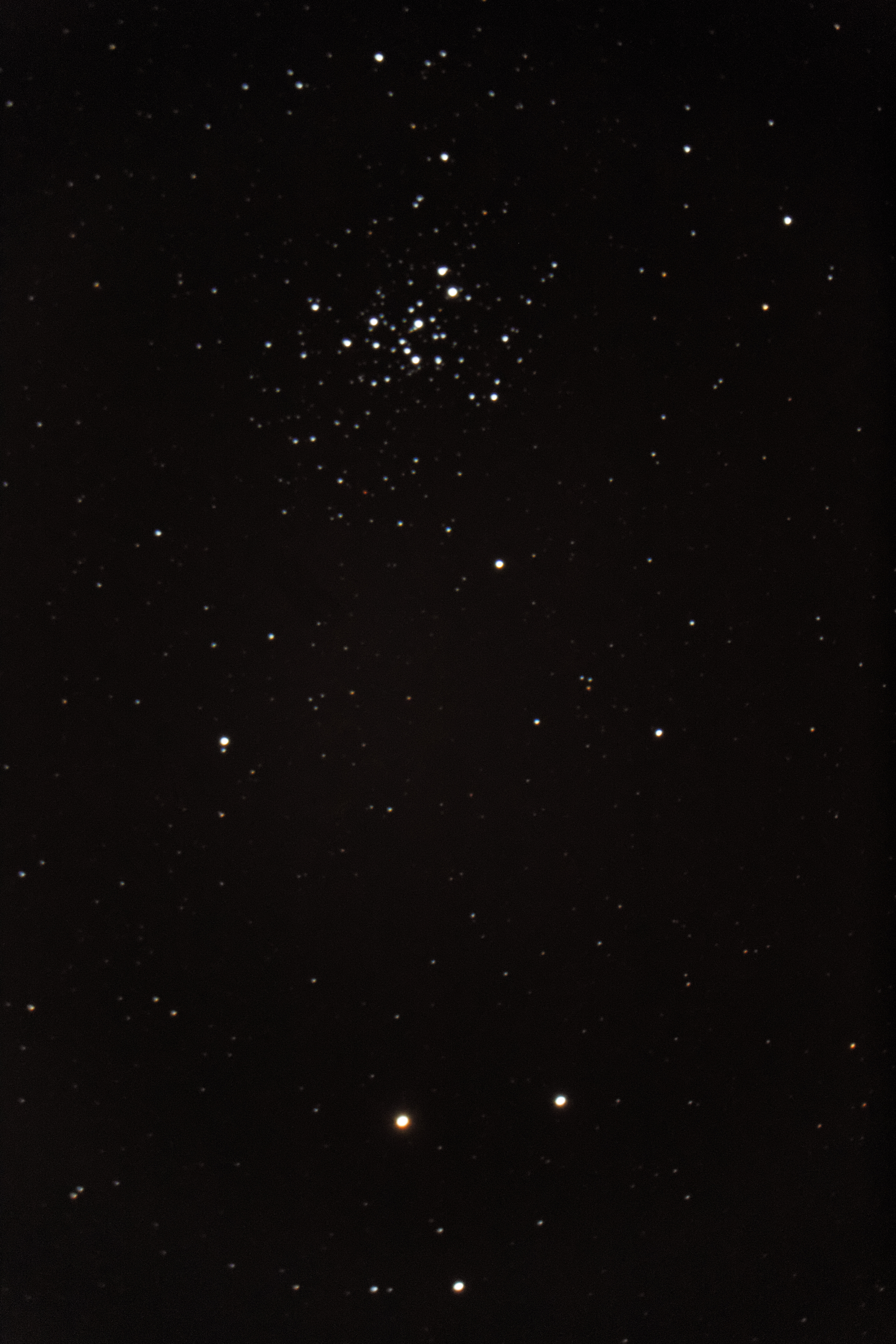
Reddish ζ^{2} Scorpii alongside the fainter ζ^{1} Scorpii to the south of NGC 6231

Zeta^{2} Scorpii (Zeta^{2} Sco, ζ^{2} Scorpii, ζ^{2} Sco) is a star in the constellation of Scorpius. With an apparent visual magnitude variying s between 3.59 and 3.65, this star is visible to the naked eye. Parallax measurements derive a distance of 135 light-years to the star.

The spectrum of this star matches a spectral class of K4 III, with the luminosity class "III" classifying it as a giant star that has exhausted all the hydrogen at its core and has expanded. Around six billion years old, this 1.18-solar mass star has swollen to 18.7 solar diameters and now radiates 130 times the Sun's luminosity from its photosphere. The effective temperature of the star has cooled to 4,286 K, giving it the orangish hue typical of a K-type star.

Zeta2 is located near the blue-white supergiant star ζ^{1} Scorpii in Earth's sky. In astronomical terms, ζ^{2} is much closer to the Sun and unrelated to ζ^{1} except for line-of sight co-incidence. ζ^{1} is about 6,000 light-years away and probably an outlying member of open star cluster NGC 6231 (also known as the "northern jewel box" cluster). ζ^{2} can also be distinguished from its optical partner, ζ^{1}, because of its orangish colour especially in long-exposure astrophotographs.
