= Elephant's Trunk Nebula =

Nebula in the constellation Cepheus

Emission nebula
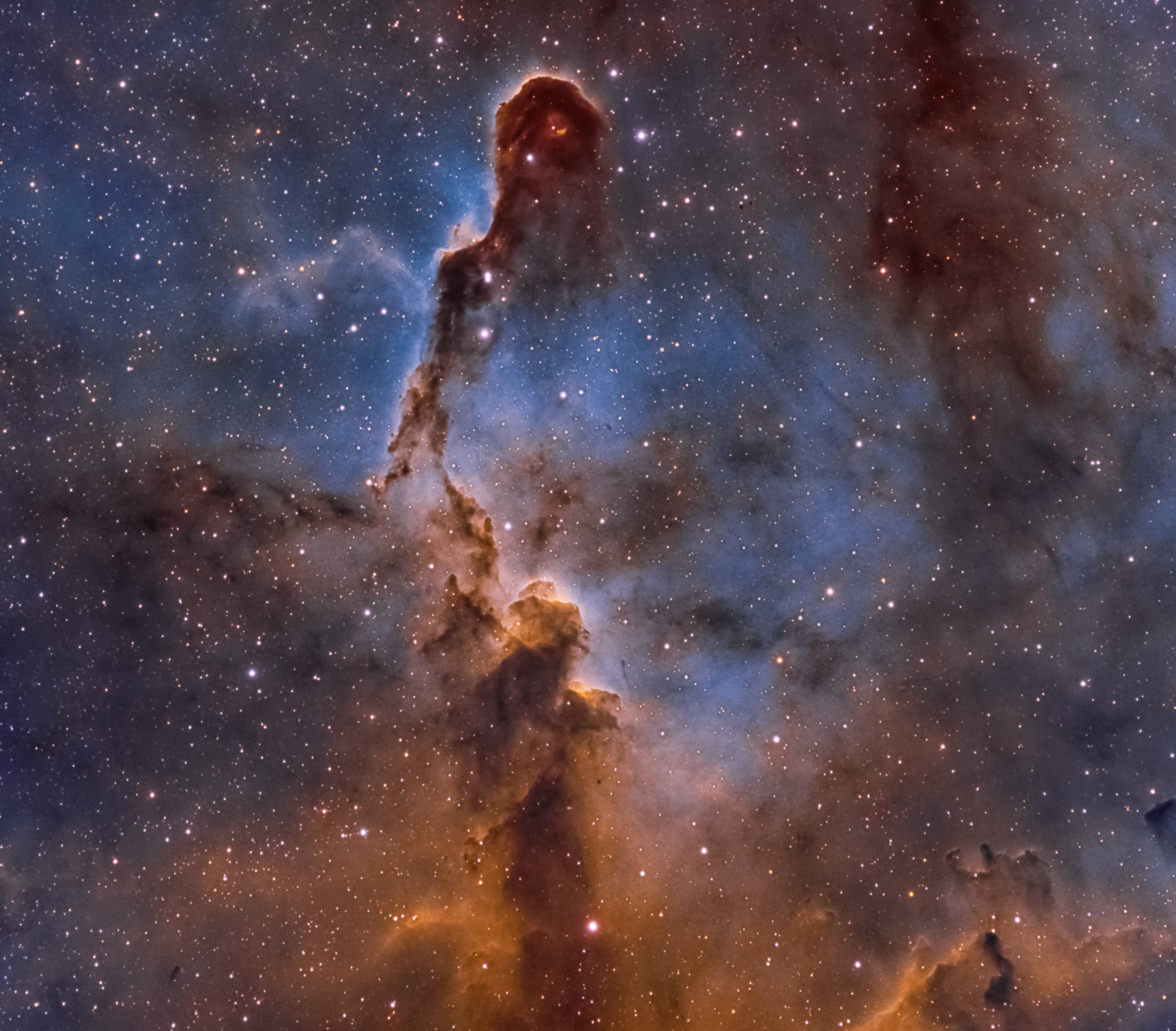
- Image of Elephant's Trunk Nebula

Observation data
- Distance: 2,400 ly
- Constellation: Cepheus

The Elephant's Trunk Nebula (IC 1396A) is a concentration of interstellar gas and dust within the much larger ionized gas region IC 1396 located in the constellation Cepheus about 2,400 light years away from Earth. The nebula is a dark, dense globule that gets its name from its appearance at visible light wavelengths, where there is a dark patch with a bright, sinuous rim. The bright rim is the surface of the dense cloud that is being illuminated and ionized by a very bright, massive multiple star (HD 206267) that is just to the east of the Elephant's Trunk Nebula. The entire IC 1396 region is ionized by the massive star, except for dense globules that can protect themselves from the star's harsh ultraviolet rays.

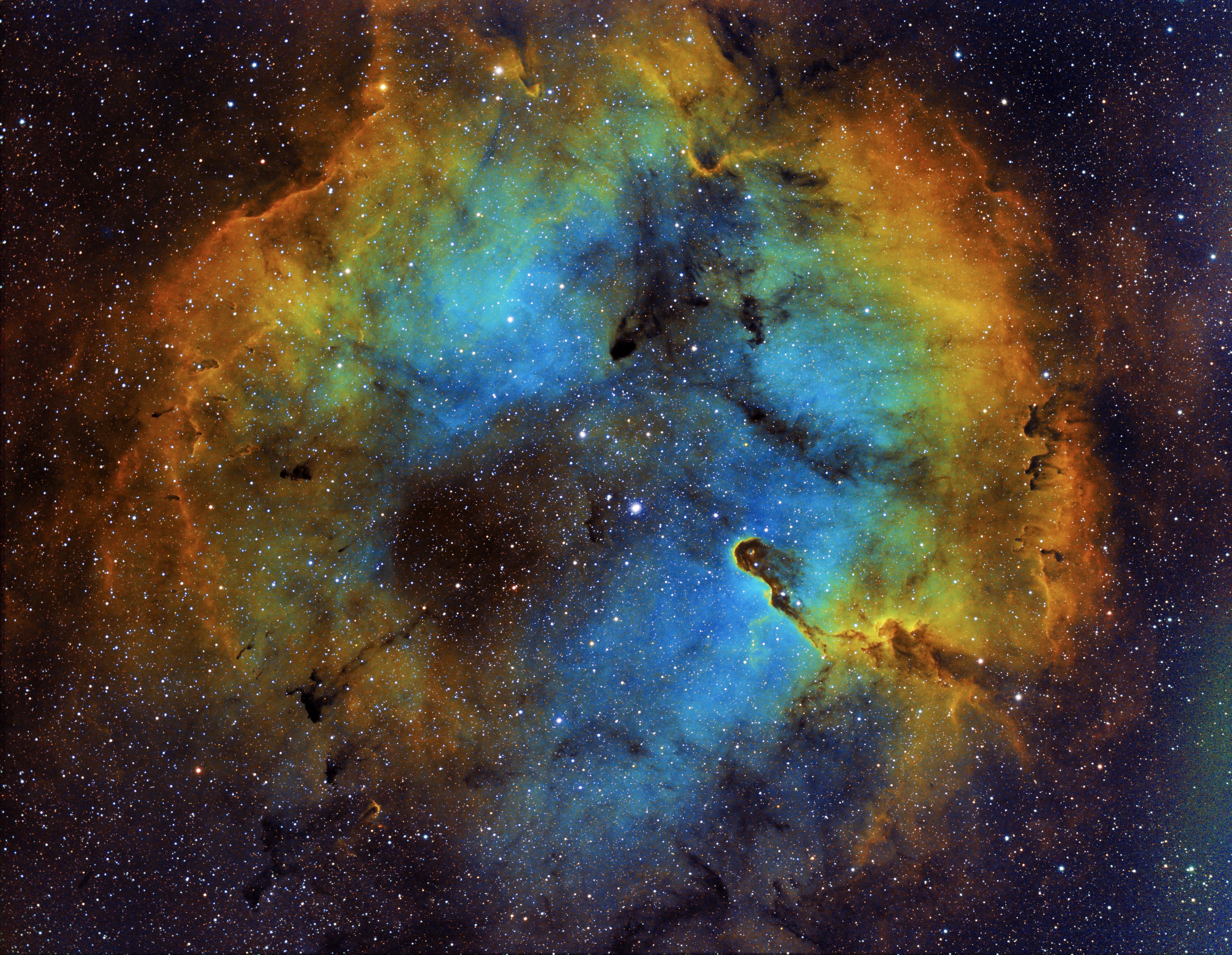
Widefield view of the full IC 1396 nebula

The Elephant's Trunk Nebula is now thought to be a site of star formation, containing several very young (less than 100,000 yr) stars that were discovered in infrared images in 2003. Two older (but still young, a couple of million years, by the standards of stars, which live for billions of years) stars are present in a small, circular cavity in the head of the globule. Winds from these young stars may have emptied the cavity.

The combined action of the light from the massive star ionizing and compressing the rim of the cloud, and the wind from the young stars shifting gas from the center outward lead to very high compression in the Elephant's Trunk Nebula. This pressure has triggered the current generation of protostars.

== See also ==
- List of largest nebulae
- Lists of nebulae
