= 68 Cygni =

Star in the constellation Cygnus

- Location of 68 Cygni (circled)

Observation data Epoch J2000 Equinox ICRS
- Constellation: Cygnus
- Right ascension: 21^{h} 18^{m} 27.18622^{s}
- Declination: +43° 56′ 45.3992″
- Apparent magnitude (V): 5.00

Characteristics
- Evolutionary stage: main sequence
- Spectral type: O7.5IIIn((f))
- U−B color index: −0.94
- B−V color index: −0.01
- Variable type: ELL (Note: Unusual variations for such a variable)

Astrometry
Radial velocity (R_{v})	1 ± 5 km/s
Proper motion (μ)	RA: +4.632 mas/yr Dec.: −8.487 mas/yr
Parallax (π)	1.4498±0.1152 mas
Distance	2,200 ± 200 ly (690 ± 50 pc)
Absolute magnitude (M_{V})	−7.9

Details
Mass	36+14 −10 M_{☉}
Radius	15.7+2.3 −2.0 R_{☉}
Luminosity	316,000+110,000 −82,000 L_{☉}
Surface gravity (log g)	3.6+0.09 −0.08 cgs
Temperature	34,000 K
Rotational velocity (v sin i)	399 km/s

Other designations
- V1809 Cygni, A Cygni, HD 203064, HR 8154, BD+43 3877, HIP 105186, WDS J21185+4357

Database references
SIMBAD	data

68 Cygni is a star in the constellation Cygnus. Located approximately 690 parsecs (2,300 ly) distant, the star is a hot blue giant of spectral type O7.5IIIn((f)), a massive star that is likely currently expanding to become a supergiant. The star is surrounded by a ring-shaped nebula (likely a Strömgren sphere) named Sharpless 2-119 (Clamshell nebula).

68 Cygni is currently classified as a rotating ellipsoidal variable, varying between apparent magnitudes 4.98 and 5.09, although the classification as a rotating ellipsoidal variable is subject to controversy. Barely visible to the naked eye, the star is likely to have a mass of around 26 solar masses and a temperature of approximately 34,000 kelvins, although many of the star's physical parameters are subject to uncertainties due to the unclear nature of the system.

== Naming ==
Being visible to the naked eye, 68 Cygni would have been observable since ancient times, but the first known cataloging and designation of the star was by Johann Bayer, who assigned it the Bayer designation A Cygni. Bayer grouped stars into six magnitude groupings (1st- through 6th-magnitude) and assigned Greek letters to the brightest 24 stars in these groupings, sorted by right ascension within groups. When he ran out of Greek letters, Bayer then moved on to Latin letters; thus, 68 Cygni was the 25th star Bayer designated in Cygnus.

The star was later observed by John Flamsteed, who cataloged naked-eye stars by constellation. Contrary to popular belief, Flamsteed did not assign the stars Flamsteed designations; rather, the French astronomer Joseph Jérôme de Lalande assigned Flamsteed numbers to stars in each constellation in order of right ascension. Since this star was the 68th star by right ascention in Cygnus, it was numbered 68 Cygni, the designation by which this star is most commonly known today, as most Latin-letter Bayer designations are no longer in common use.

After the star was discovered to be variable, it was assigned a variable star designation. As the 1809th variable star without a Bayer designation to be discovered in Cygnus, 68 Cygni was assigned the designation V1809 Cygni in 1984.

== Observation ==
68 Cygni has an apparent magnitude of approximately 5.0, making the star a fairly inconspicuous star in the night sky, and nearly invisible when the moon is full. With a new moon, according to the Bortle scale, the star cannot be easily seen with the naked eye from polluted areas or with a full moon, but can be seen from suburban areas when overhead.

In the night sky, 68 Cygni is located west of the main asterism of Cygnus, approximately seven degrees east-southeast of the first-magnitude star Deneb. This is near the midpoint of the imaginary line between the 3rd-magnitude stars Xi Cygni and Rho Cygni. The star can also be found by continuing north along the line between the stars Zeta Cygni, Upsilon Cygni, Tau Cygni, and Sigma Cygni, as 68 Cygni is the first easily visible naked-eye star one will come to.

== Properties ==
According to the star's measured parallax of 1.4″×10^{−3}, it is located approximately 690 parsecs (2,300 ly) distant. A more complex statistical analysis of the likely distance gives a value between 640 parsecs (2,100 ly) and 760 parsecs (2,500 ly).

68 Cygni is a massive blue giant of spectral type O7.5IIIn((f)). Such massive stars only remain in the main sequence phase for a few million years, less than a thousandth of the expected main sequence lifetime of the sun. Despite the spectral classification, 68 Cygni is modelled to still be on the main sequence, fusing hydrogen in its core. In massive stars, the products of fusion burning are distributed throughout the star by convection and rotational mixing, producing helium and nitrogen lines in the spectrum, leading to an increase in the thickness of the stellar wind, and accompanied by a modest expansion and cooling of the star even while it is still on the main sequence. The "n" in the spectral type indicates the presence of broad absorption lines due to how rapidly the star is spinning. The "((f))" indicates strong absorption in the He II spectral lines and weak N III emission lines.

The star has been tentatively classified as a rotating ellipsoidal variable, varying between magnitudes 4.98 and 5.09. Rotating ellipsoidal variables are binary systems in which the constituent components are distorted into ellipses due to fast rotation rates, and as the two stars orbit each other, the surface area of the star facing Earth changes, causing variations in brightness. However, the actual cause of the variability, and even whether or not there is a companion, was uncertain. No companion has ever been directly detected, but its existence has been inferred from spectral line variations (radial velocity variations) in the primary O-type star. A period of 5.1 days has been assigned for the orbit of the binary, which is approximately the same as the rotation period of the star. Unlike typical rotating ellipsoidal variables, there is no clearly defined period in the variations in brightness. Data derived from the assumption of a binary system, for example the mass, are highly uncertain due to the lack of information about the inclination or eccentricity of the orbit, or even whether there is a companion.

A 2021 review of multiplicity of O-type stars rules out the previously suspected companion, finding the radial velocity variations to be intrinsic to the star. 68 Cygni is more likely a single star.

The spectral lines of 68 Cygni vary erratically, but possibly with a period around 5 days. The lines frequently show P Cygni profiles with both an absorption and emission component slightly offset due to doppler shifting. The emission component arises primarily in the stellar wind and the absorption component in the photosphere. The emission components of the spectral lines are largely constant, but the absorption components vary, leading to changes in the line profiles. This is strongest in the ultraviolet part of the electromagnetic spectrum and has been extensively studied by the International Ultraviolet Explorer satellite. The type and scale of the spectroscopic variations indicates large-scale structures within the stellar wind.

== Sharpless 2-119 (Clamshell nebula) ==
68 Cygni is known to be surrounded by a ring-shaped nebula, named Sharpless 2-119 (Clamshell nebula). Although it was originally proposed that this nebula was formed from 68 Cygni's stellar wind, it now appears that the nebula is simply a Strömgren sphere that is being ionized by 68 Cygni. Instead, the stellar wind is likely due to the star's high velocity through space, forming a bow shock.
