= Theta Cephei =

Star in the constellation Cepheus

- Location of θ Cephei (circled in red)

Observation data Epoch J2000 Equinox ICRS
- Constellation: Cepheus
- Right ascension: 20^{h} 29^{m} 34.86518^{s}
- Declination: +62° 59′ 38.6216″
- Apparent magnitude (V): 4.22

Characteristics
- Spectral type: A7 III or kA7hF1mF2
- U−B color index: +0.16
- B−V color index: +0.20

Astrometry
Radial velocity (R_{v})	−6.8 km/s
Proper motion (μ)	RA: 34.798 mas/yr Dec.: −13.904 mas/yr
Parallax (π)	23.481±0.6894 mas
Distance	139 ± 4 ly (43 ± 1 pc)
Absolute magnitude (M_{V})	+1.12

Orbit
Period (P)	914.3±7.0 d
Eccentricity (e)	0.377±0.006
Periastron epoch (T)	2456991.3±8.5 JD
Argument of periastron (ω) (primary)	48.8±1.1°
Semi-amplitude (K_{1}) (primary)	7.72±0.06 km/s

Details

primary
Mass	2.75 M_{☉}
Radius	3.09+0.36 −0.25 R_{☉}
Luminosity	46.5 L_{☉}
Surface gravity (log g)	3.74 cgs
Temperature	7,375+307 −404 K
Metallicity [Fe/H]	+0.27±0.04 dex
Rotational velocity (v sin i)	52.0 km/s
Age	55 Myr

companion
Mass	>0.62 M_{☉}
Radius	0.654+0.044 −0.102 R_{☉}
Temperature	4,070+340 −130 K

Other designations
- θ Cep, 2 Cep, BD+62°1821, FK5 767, HD 195725, HIP 101093, HR 7850, SAO 18897

Database references
SIMBAD	data

Theta Cephei is a white-hued binary star system in the northern constellation of Cepheus. Its name is a Bayer designation that is Latinized from θ Cephei, and abbreviated Theta Cep or θ Cep. The system is visible to the naked eye as a point of light with an apparent visual magnitude of 4.22. Based on parallax measurements, it is located at a distance of approximately 139 light-years (43 pc) from the Earth.

This is a spectroscopic binary star system with an orbital period of 2.5 years; the eccentricity was long thought to be low, at 0.03, but calculations published in 2020 have put it at a much higher 0.377. They are separated by 4.16 AU.

The primary component has a Stellar classification of A7III, displaying as a metallic-line Am star. At an estimated age of 55 million years, it is spinning with a projected rotational velocity of 52 km/s. The star has 2.75 times the mass of the Sun and three times the Sun's radius. It is radiating 46.5 times the luminosity of the Sun from its photosphere at an effective temperature of 7,375 K. The companion star is calculated to be about 400 times fainter than the primary. It is completely invisible in the spectrum, but is estimated to be a K7 main sequence star.

Shared with η Cep, this star system has the title Al Kidr. In Chinese, 天鈎 (Tiān Gōu), meaning Celestial Hook, refers to an asterism consisting of 4 Cephei, HD 194298, η Cephei, α Cephei, ξ Cephei, 26 Cephei, ι Cephei and ο Cephei. Consequently, the Chinese name for θ Cephei itself is 天鈎三 (Tiān Gōu sān, English: the Third Star of Celestial Hook.).
