= Eta Cephei =

Star in the constellation Cepheus

η Cephei
- Location of η Cephei (circled)

Observation data Epoch J2000.0 Equinox ICRS
- Constellation: Cepheus
- Right ascension: 20^{h} 45^{m} 17.37517^{s}
- Declination: +61° 50′ 19.6142″
- Apparent magnitude (V): 3.426

Characteristics
- Evolutionary stage: subgiant
- Spectral type: K0 IV
- U−B color index: +0.613
- B−V color index: +0.918

Astrometry
Radial velocity (R_{v})	−87.55±0.11 km/s
Proper motion (μ)	RA: +85.993 mas/yr Dec.: +818.451 mas/yr
Parallax (π)	69.5976±0.1279 mas
Distance	46.86 ± 0.09 ly (14.37 ± 0.03 pc)
Absolute magnitude (M_{V})	2.631

Details
Mass	1.40±0.14 M_{☉}
Radius	3.86±0.02 R_{☉}
Luminosity	8.4±0.0 L_{☉}
Surface gravity (log g)	3.30±0.06 cgs
Temperature	5,000±9 K
Metallicity [Fe/H]	−0.22±0.02 dex
Rotational velocity (v sin i)	6.79 km/s
Age	2.5±0.3 Gyr

Other designations
- η Cep, 3 Cep, BD+61 2050, FK5 783, GJ 807, HD 198149, HIP 102422, HR 7957, SAO 19019

Database references
SIMBAD	data

Eta Cephei is a star in the northern circumpolar constellation of Cepheus. Its name is a Bayer designation that is Latinized from η Cephei, and abbreviated Eta Cephei or η Cep. With an apparent visual magnitude of 3.4, this is a third magnitude star that, according to the Bortle Dark-Sky Scale, is readily visible to the naked eye. Parallax measurements put it at a distance of 14.37 parsecs (46.9 light-years) from Earth.

== Etymology ==
Eta Cephei, along with α Cephei (Alderamin) and β Cep (Alfirk), were identified as Al Kawākib al Firḳ (الكوكب الفرق), meaning "the Stars of The Flock" by Ulug Beg. Together with θ Cephei, it form Al Kidr. Among its other designations includes the name Kabalfird.

In Chinese, 天鈎 (Tiān Gōu), meaning Celestial Hook, refers to an asterism consisting of η Cephei, 4 Cephei, HD 194298, θ Cephei, α Cephei, ξ Cephei, 26 Cephei, ι Cephei and ο Cephei. Consequently, the Chinese name for η Cephei itself is 天鈎四 (Tiān Gōu sì, English: the Fourth Star of Celestial Hook.).

== Properties ==
Eta Cephei is a subgiant star with a stellar classification of K0 IV, which indicates it is exhausting the supply of hydrogen at its core and is in the process of evolving into a giant star. With 1.4 times the Sun's mass, at an age of 2.5 billion years it has reached a radius 3.86 times larger than the Sun and a luminosity 8.4 times greater. It is radiating this energy from its outer atmosphere at an effective temperature of 5,000 K, giving it the orange-hued glow of a K-type star. Eta Cephei has a high proper motion across the celestial sphere and a large peculiar velocity of 112 km s^{−1}.

== Hunt for substellar objects ==
According to Nelson & Angel (1998), Eta Cephei would show two significant periodicities of 164 days and 10 years respectively, hinting at the possible presence of one or more jovian planets in orbit around the subgiant. The authors have set an upper limit of 0.64 Jupiter masses for the putative inner planet and 1.2 Jupiter masses for the putative outer one. Also Campbell et al. (1988) inferred the existence of planetary objects or even brown dwarfs less massive than 16.3 Jupiter masses.

However, more recent studies have not yet confirmed the existence of any substellar companion around Eta Cephei. McDonald Observatory team has set limits to the presence of one or more planets with masses between 0.13 and 2.4 Jupiter masses and average separations spanning between 0.05 and 5.2 AU.
