= Xi Cephei =

Star in the constellation Cepheus

ξ Cephei
- Location of ξ Cephei (circled)

Observation data Epoch J2000 Equinox ICRS
- Constellation: Cepheus
- A
- Right ascension: 22^{h} 03^{m} 47.440^{s}
- Declination: +64° 37′ 40.70″
- Apparent magnitude (V): 4.45 (4.61 + 6.50)‍
- B
- Right ascension: 22^{h} 03^{m} 46.217^{s}
- Declination: +64° 37′ 41.47″
- Apparent magnitude (V): 6.34

Characteristics

A
- Spectral type: kA2.5hF2mF2(IV) (A3Vm + F2III)‍

B
- Evolutionary stage: main sequence
- Spectral type: F8V

Astrometry

A
Radial velocity (R_{v})	−7.2±2 km/s
Proper motion (μ)	RA: +212.563 mas/yr Dec.: +89.058 mas/yr
Parallax (π)	32.12±0.8066 mas
Distance	102 ± 3 ly (31.1 ± 0.8 pc)

B
Radial velocity (R_{v})	−6.2±2 km/s
Proper motion (μ)	RA: +202.094 mas/yr Dec.: +81/933 mas/yr
Parallax (π)	32.1835±0.0184 mas
Distance	101.34 ± 0.06 ly (31.07 ± 0.02 pc)

Orbit
Period (P)	2.245+0.001 −0.000 years
Semi-major axis (a)	0.072+0.000 −0.001″
Eccentricity (e)	0.460+0.009 −0.008
Inclination (i)	67.447+0.508 −0.443°
Longitude of the node (Ω)	272.995+0.702 −0.301°
Periastron epoch (T)	1968.751+7 −5
Argument of periastron (ω) (secondary)	90.354+0.315 −0.418°
Semi-amplitude (K_{1}) (primary)	7.81 km/s
Semi-amplitude (K_{2}) (secondary)	19.98 km/s

Details

Aa
Mass	1.721+0.134 −0.120 M_{☉}
Luminosity	6.6 L_{☉}
Temperature	7,943 K
Age	200 Myr

Ab
Mass	0.512 (Note: from primary mass and mass ratio) M_{☉}
Luminosity	1.8 L_{☉}
Temperature	6,310 K
Age	525 Myr

B
Mass	1.14 M_{☉}
Radius	1.28 R_{☉}
Luminosity	2.08 L_{☉}
Surface gravity (log g)	4.26 cgs
Temperature	6,123 K
Age	3.98 Gyr

Other designations
- Kurhah, 17 Cephei, BD+63°1802, HIP 108917, HR 8417, SAO 19827, CCDM J22038+2407, WDS J22038+6438
- A: HD 209790
- B: HD 209791

Database references
SIMBAD	ξ
- A
- B

Xi Cephei is a multiple star system in the northern constellation of Cepheus. Its name is a Bayer designation. This system is visible to the naked eye as a point of light with a combined apparent visual magnitude of 4.29. Based on parallax measurements, it is located at a distance of approximately 102 light-years from Earth.

This system consists of a binary pair, designated Xi Cephei A, together with a more distant companion, Xi Cephei B. A's two components are themselves designated Xi Cephei Aa (officially named Kurhah /ˈkɜːrhə/, the traditional name of the system) and Ab.

== Nomenclature ==
ξ Cephei, Latinized to Xi Cephei, is the system's Bayer designation. It is abbreviated Xi Cep or ξ Cep. The designations of the three constituents as ξ Cephei A, B and C, and those of A's components – ξ Cephei Aa and Ab – derive from the convention used by the Washington Multiplicity Catalog (WMC) for multiple star systems, and adopted by the International Astronomical Union (IAU).

Xi Cephei bore the traditional names Kurhah, Alkirdah or Al Kirduh, the name coming from Qazvini who gave Al Ḳurḥaḥ (القرحة al-qurhah), an Arabic word Ideler translated as a white spot, or blaze, in the face of a horse. Allen indicates that Ideler felt this was not a proper name for a star, and suggested the name Al Ḳirdah (ألقردة al qírada "the Ape"). In 2016, the International Astronomical Union organized a Working Group on Star Names (WGSN) to catalogue and standardize proper names for stars. The WGSN decided to attribute proper names to individual stars rather than entire multiple systems. It approved the name Kurhah for the component Xi Cephei Aa on 12 September 2016 and it is now so included in the List of IAU-approved Star Names.

In Chinese, 天鈎 (Tiān Gōu), meaning Celestial Hook, refers to an asterism consisting of Xi Cephei, 4 Cephei, HD 194298, Eta Cephei, Theta Cephei, Alpha Cephei, 26 Cephei, Iota Cephei and Omicron Cephei. Consequently, the Chinese name for Xi Cephei itself is 天鈎六 (Tiān Gōu liù, English: the Sixth Star of Celestial Hook).

== Properties ==
Xi Cephei A is a double-lined spectroscopic binary system with an orbital period of 820 days and an eccentricity of 0.5. The primary, component Aa, is a chemically peculiar Am star with an apparent magnitude of +4.61. The spectroscopic secondary, component Ab, is an F-type star.

Eight arcseconds away from Xi Cephei A, Xi Cephei B is a 6th-magnitude main sequence star.

Xi Cephei C is a 13th magnitude star nearly two arcminutes away. It has a small parallax and is an unrelated background star only accidentally in line with Xi Cephei.
