= Deneb =

Blue supergiant star in the constellation Cygnus

- Location of Deneb

Observation data Epoch J2000 Equinox ICRS
- Constellation: Cygnus
- Pronunciation: /ˈdɛnɛb/, /ˈdɛnəb/
- Right ascension: 20^{h} 41^{m} 25.9^{s}
- Declination: +45° 16′ 49″
- Apparent magnitude (V): 1.25 (1.21–1.29)

Characteristics
- Evolutionary stage: Blue supergiant
- Spectral type: A2 Ia
- U−B color index: −0.23
- B−V color index: +0.09
- Variable type: Alpha Cygni

Astrometry
Radial velocity (R_{v})	−4.5 km/s
Proper motion (μ)	RA: 1.99 mas/yr Dec.: 1.95 mas/yr
Parallax (π)	2.31±0.32 mas
Distance	2,029 ± 65 ly (622±20 pc)
Absolute magnitude (M_{V})	−7.835 (Note: Calculated using the equation which converts bolometric luminosity into absolute magnitude (Bessell et al. (1998)): M_{bol} = 4.74 - 2.5 • log(L), where log(L), in terms of solar luminosity, is 5.03. Replacing the value of log(L) in the equation yields M_{bol} = 4.74 - 2.5 • 5.03 = −7.835.)

Details
Mass	8.8±0.4 M_{☉}
Radius	138 ± 6 (Note: Calculated, using the Stefan-Boltzmann law and the star's effective temperature and luminosity, with respect to the solar nominal effective temperature of 5,772 K: $$\sqrt{\biggl(\frac{5,772}{8,900}\biggr)^4 \cdot 10^{5.03}} = 138\ R_\odot.$$) R_{☉}
Luminosity	117,500+8,400 −7,800 L_{☉}
Surface gravity (log g)	1.10±0.05 – 1.45 cgs
Temperature	8,900±135 K
Metallicity [Fe/H]	−0.20 dex
Rotational velocity (v sin i)	20±2 km/s
Age	10.2±1.0 Myr

Other designations
- Arided, Aridif, Gallina, Arrioph, α Cygni, 50 Cygni, BD+44°3541, FK5 777, HD 197345, HIP 102098, HR 7924, SAO 49941

Database references
SIMBAD	data

Deneb (/ˈdɛnɛb/) is a blue supergiant star in the northern constellation of Cygnus. It is the brightest star in the constellation and the 19th brightest in the night sky, with an apparent magnitude slightly varying between +1.21 and +1.29. Deneb is one of the vertices of the asterism known as the Summer Triangle and the "head" of the Northern Cross. Its Bayer designation is α Cygni, which is Latinised to Alpha Cygni, abbreviated to Alpha Cyg or α Cyg.

Deneb rivals Rigel, a closer blue supergiant, as the most luminous first-magnitude star. Historical uncertainties in both stars' distances, and hence luminosities, difficulted a clear conclusion, but the most recent measurements suggest that both stars have similar luminosities, at around 120,000 times that of the Sun. Deneb's most recent distance estimate is 622 parsecs (2,030 light-years), making it one of the farthest stars with an apparent magnitude brighter than 2.50, along with Eta Canis Majoris, which sits at a similar distance.

== Nomenclature ==
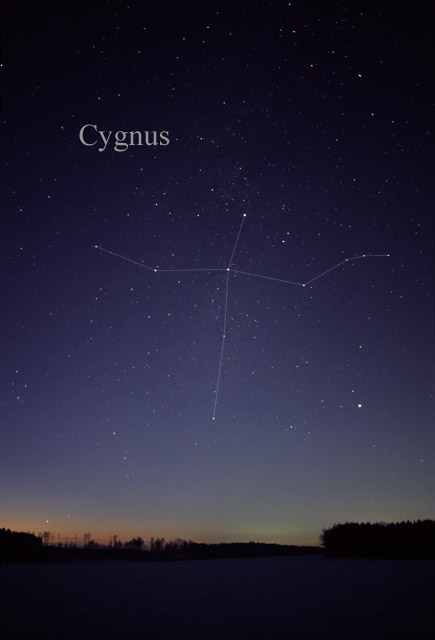
Deneb is the brighest star in the constellation of Cygnus (top)

α Cygni (Greco-Latinised to Alpha Cygni) is the star's designation given by Johann Bayer in 1603. The traditional name Deneb is derived from the Arabic word for "tail", from the phrase ذنب الدجاجة Dhanab al-Dajājah, or "tail of the hen". The IAU Working Group on Star Names has recognised the name Deneb for this star, and it is entered in their Catalog of Star Names.

Denebadigege was used in the Alfonsine Tables, other variants include Deneb Adige, Denebedigege and Arided. This latter name was derived from Al Ridhādh, a name for the constellation. Johann Bayer called it Arrioph, derived from Aridf and Al Ridf, 'the hindmost' or Gallina. German poet and author Philippus Caesius termed it Os rosae, or Rosemund in German, or Uropygium – the parson's nose. The names Arided and Aridif have fallen out of use.

An older traditional name is Arided /ˈærɪdɛd/, from the Arabic ar-ridf 'the one sitting behind the rider' (or just 'the follower'), perhaps referring to the other major stars of Cygnus, which were called al-fawāris 'the riders'.

== Observation ==
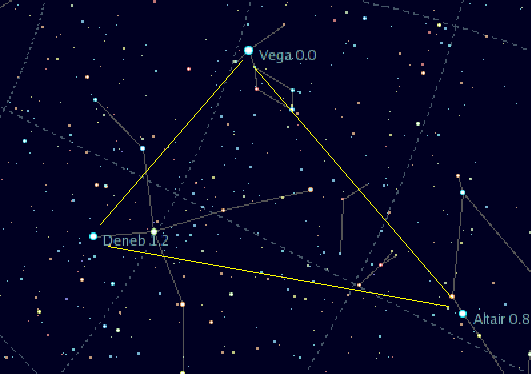
The Summer Triangle

The 19th brightest star in the night sky, Deneb culminates each year on October 23 at 6 PM and September 7 at 9 PM, corresponding to summer evenings in the Northern Hemisphere. It never dips below the horizon at or above 45° north latitude, just grazing the northern horizon at its lowest point at such locations as Minneapolis, Montréal and Turin. In the Southern Hemisphere, Deneb is not visible south of 45° parallel south, so it just barely rises above the horizon in South Africa, southern Australia, and northern New Zealand during the southern winter.

Deneb is located at the tip of the Northern Cross asterism made up of the brightest stars in Cygnus, the others being Albireo (Beta Cygni), Gamma Cygni, Delta Cygni, and Epsilon Cygni. It also lies at one vertex of the prominent and widely spaced asterism called the Summer Triangle, shared with the first-magnitude stars Vega in the constellation Lyra and Altair in Aquila. This outline of stars is the approximate shape of a right triangle, with Deneb located at one of the acute angles.

The spectrum of Alpha Cygni has been observed by astronomers since at least 1888, and by 1910 the variable radial velocity had become apparent. This led to the early suggestion by E. B. Frost that this is a binary star system. In 1935, the work of G. F. Paddock and others had established that this star was variable in luminosity with a dominant period of 11.7 days and possibly with other, lower amplitude periods. By 1954, closer examination of the star's calcium H and K lines showed a stationary core, which indicated the variable velocity was instead being caused by motion of the star's atmosphere. This variation ranged from +6 to −9 km/s around the star's mean radial velocity. Other, similar supergiants were found to have variable velocities, with this star being a typical member.

=== Pole star ===
Due to the Earth's axial precession, Deneb will be an approximate pole star (7° off of the north celestial pole) at around 9800 AD.

The current north pole of Mars points to the midpoint of the line connecting Deneb and the star Alderamin.

Preceded by	Pole Star	Succeeded by
Alderamin	8700 AD to 11000 AD	Delta Cygni

== Physical characteristics ==
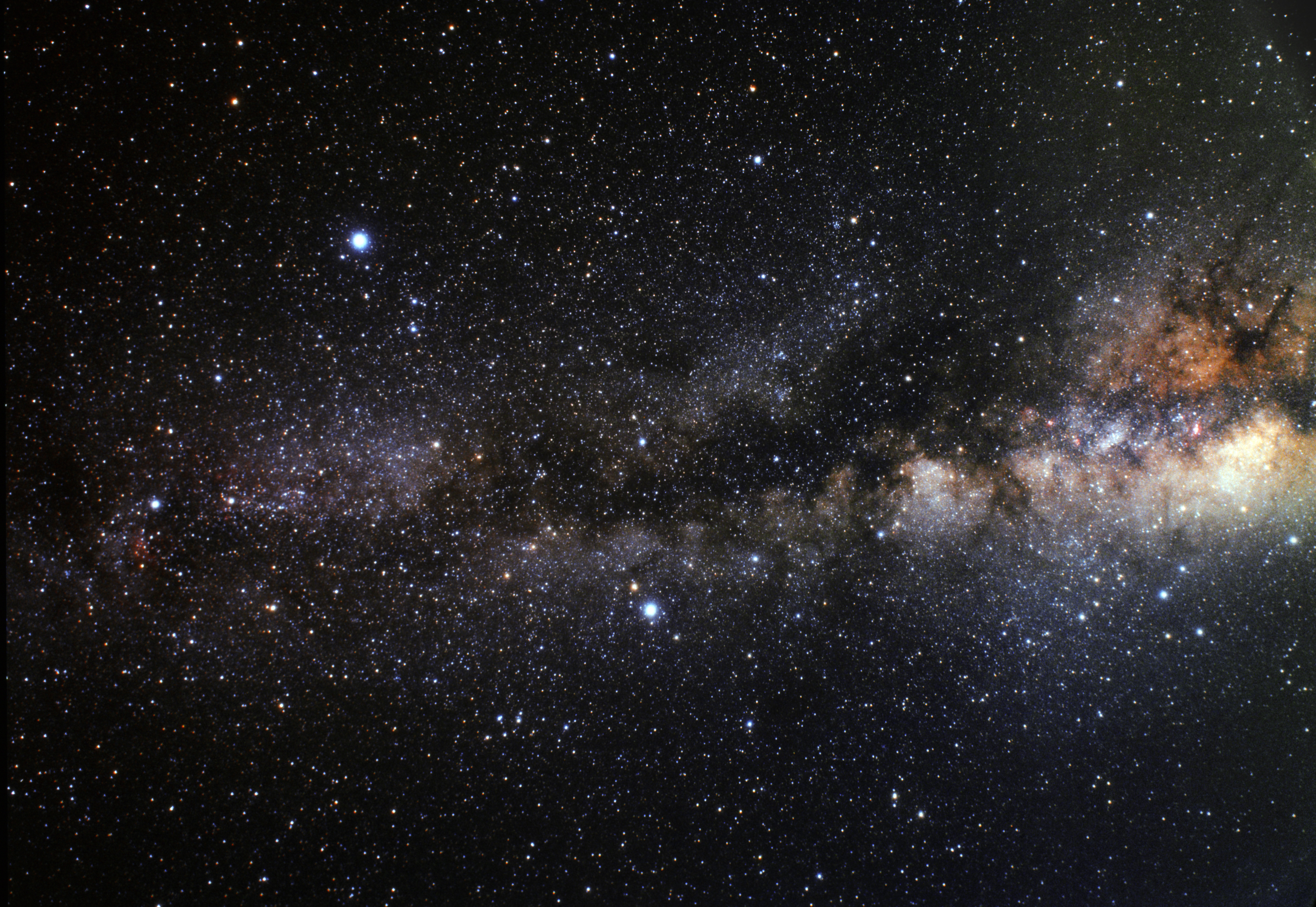
Wide-field view of the Summer Triangle and the Milky Way. Deneb is at the far left centre of the picture, at the end of the darker lane within the Milky Way.

Deneb is a bluish-white star of spectral type A2Ia, classifying it as a blue supergiant star. Since 1943, its spectrum has served as one of the stable references by which other stars are classified. The effective temperature of the star is 8,900±135 K. Its mass and age are estimated at 8.8±0.4 M_{☉} and 10±1 million years, respectively. Stellar wind causes matter to be lost at an average rate of 8±3×10^{−7} M_{☉} per year, 100,000 times the Sun's rate of mass loss or equivalent to about one Earth mass per 500 years.

Deneb's distance from the Earth has been historically uncertain. One estimate gives 802 ± 66 parsecs (2,620 ± 220 light-years) assuming Deneb is a member of the Cygnus OB7 association. The original derivation of a parallax using measurements from the astrometric satellite Hipparcos gave an uncertain result of 1.01±0.57 mas that was consistent with this distance. However, the 2007 re-analysis gives a much larger parallax resulting in a distance of 433±60 pc, or 1,410 ± 200 ly. The controversy over whether the direct Hipparcos measurements can be ignored in favour of a wide range of indirect stellar models and interstellar distance scales is similar to the better known situation with the Pleiades.

At its highest distance estimate, Deneb's absolute magnitude is estimated as −8.38, placing it among the visually brightest stars known, with an estimated luminosity of nearly 196,000±32,000 L_{☉}. By the distance from Hipparcos parallax, Deneb has a luminosity of 55,000 L_{☉}.

One 2026 study relying on Gaia parallaxes published a distance of 622 ± 20 parsecs (2,029 ± 65 ly) for Deneb, more precise than previous estimates. At this distance it would have a luminosity of around 120,000 L_{☉} and an absolute magnitude of −7.835. Interstellar dust in the line of sight causes Deneb's apparent magnitude to be fainter by 0.124 magnitudes.

Deneb is one of the most luminous first magnitude stars, that is, stars with a brighter apparent magnitude than 1.5. Deneb is also the most distant of the 30 brightest stars. Based on its temperature and luminosity, Deneb appears to have a diameter about 140 times that of the Sun; if placed at the center of the Solar System, it would extend to the orbit of Mercury. At the earlier distance estimates of 433 and 802 parsecs, the corresponding radii would be 117+14
−19 R_{☉} and 203±17 R_{☉}, respectively.

=== Evolutionary state ===
Deneb spent much of its early life as an main sequence star of about 8.8 M_{☉}, but it has now exhausted the hydrogen in its core and expanded to become a supergiant. Stars in the mass range of Deneb eventually expand to become the most luminous red supergiants, and within a few million years their cores will collapse producing a supernova explosion. It is now known that red supergiants up to a certain mass explode as the commonly seen type II-P supernovae, but more massive ones lose their outer layers to become hotter again. Depending on their initial masses and the rate of mass loss, they may explode as yellow hypergiants or luminous blue variables, or they may become Wolf-Rayet stars before exploding in a type Ib or Ic supernova. Identifying whether Deneb is currently evolving towards a red supergiant or is currently evolving bluewards again would place valuable constraints on the classes of stars that explode as red supergiants and those that explode as hotter stars.

Stars evolving red-wards for the first time are most likely fusing hydrogen in a shell around a helium core that has not yet grown hot enough to start fusion to carbon and oxygen. Convection has begun dredging up fusion products but these do not reach the surface. Post-red supergiant stars are expected to show those fusion products at the surface due to stronger convection during the red supergiant phase and due to loss of the obscuring outer layers of the star. Deneb is thought to be increasing its temperature after a period as a red supergiant, although current models do not exactly reproduce the surface elements showing in its spectrum. On the contrary, it is possible that Deneb has just left the main sequence and is evolving to a red supergiant phase, which is in agreement with estimates of its current mass, while its spectral composition can be explained by Deneb having been a rapidly rotating star during its main sequence phase.

=== Variable star ===
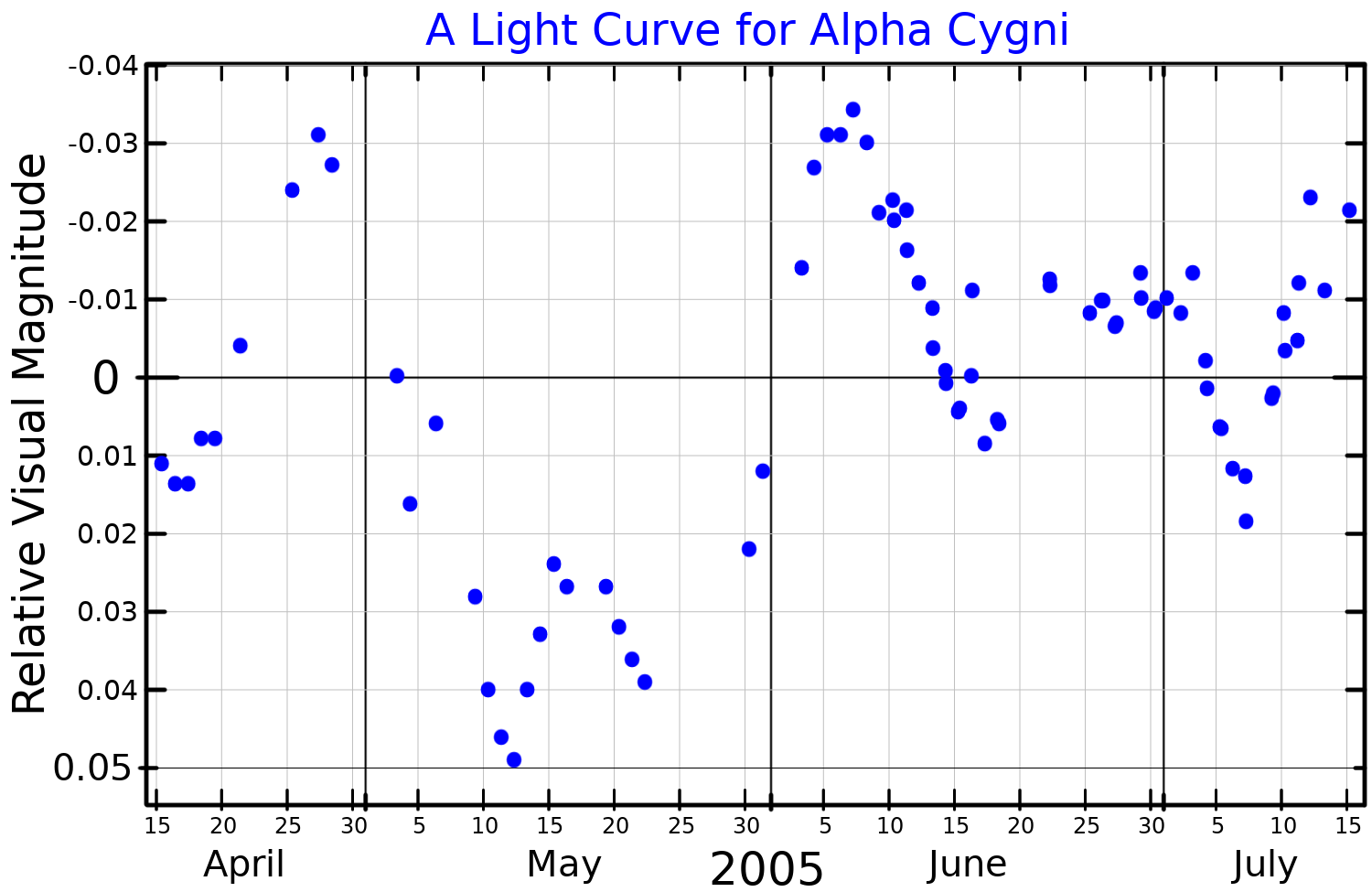
A visual band light curve for Deneb, adapted from Yüce and Adelman (2019)

Deneb is the prototype of the Alpha Cygni (α Cygni) variable stars, whose small amplitudes and irregular rapid pulsations can cause its magnitude to vary anywhere between 1.21 and 1.29. Its variable radial velocity was discovered by Lee in 1910, but it was not formally placed as a distinct class of variable stars until the 1985 4th edition of the General Catalogue of Variable Stars. The cause of the pulsations of Alpha Cygni variable stars is not fully understood, but their irregular nature seems to be due to beating of multiple pulsation periods. Analysis of radial velocities determined 16 different harmonic pulsation modes with periods ranging between 6.9 and 100.8 days. A longer period of about 800 days probably also exists.

=== Possible spectroscopic companion ===
Deneb has been reported as a possible single line spectroscopic binary with a period of about 850 days, where the spectral lines from the star suggest cyclical radial velocity changes. Later investigations have found no evidence supporting the existence of a companion.

== Etymology and cultural significance ==
Names similar to Deneb have been given to at least seven different stars, most notably Deneb Kaitos, the brightest star in the constellation of Cetus; Deneb Algedi, the brightest star in Capricornus; and Denebola, the second brightest star in Leo. All these stars are referring to the tail of the animals that their respective constellations represent.

In Chinese, 天津 (Tiān Jīn), meaning Celestial Ford, refers to an asterism consisting of Deneb, Gamma Cygni, Delta Cygni, 30 Cygni, Nu Cygni, Tau Cygni, Upsilon Cygni, Zeta Cygni and Epsilon Cygni. Consequently, the Chinese name for Deneb itself is 天津四 (Tiān Jīn sì, English: the Fourth Star of the Celestial Ford).

In the Chinese love story of Qi Xi, Deneb marks the magpie bridge across the Milky Way, which allows the separated lovers Niu Lang (Altair) and Zhi Nü (Vega) to be reunited on one special night of the year in late summer. In other versions of the story, Deneb is a fairy who acts as chaperone when the lovers meet.

=== Namesakes ===
USS Arided was a United States Navy Crater-class cargo ship named after the star. SS Deneb was an Italian merchant vessel that bore this name from 1951 until she was scrapped in 1966.

Deneb also lends its name to the Deneb Ceph cluster, a large-scale shared storage system operated by the STFC, providing approximately 5 PB of erasure-coded storage for scientific computing workloads.

In 2024 Impulse Space, founded by Tom Mueller, announced the development of a 15,000 lbf (67kN) oxidizer-rich staged combustion rocket engine named Deneb after the star, for use on the Helios orbital transfer vehicle.
