= Alpha Cephei =

Star in the constellation of Cepheus

α Cephei
- Location of α Cephei (circled)

Observation data Epoch J2000 Equinox ICRS
- Constellation: Cepheus
- Right ascension: 21^{h} 18^{m} 34.7723^{s}
- Declination: +62° 35′ 08.069″
- Apparent magnitude (V): 2.46

Characteristics
- Evolutionary stage: Subgiant
- Spectral type: A8Vn or A7IV-V
- U−B color index: +0.12
- B−V color index: +0.21
- Variable type: δ Sct + γ Dor

Astrometry
Radial velocity (R_{v})	−15.8±1.1 km/s
Proper motion (μ)	RA: +150.55 mas/yr Dec.: 49.09 mas/yr
Parallax (π)	66.50±0.11 mas
Distance	49.05 ± 0.08 ly (15.04 ± 0.02 pc)
Absolute magnitude (M_{V})	1.57

Details
Mass	1.92±0.04 M_{☉}
Radius	2.162±0.036 (polar); 2.740±0.044 (equator) R_{☉}
Luminosity	18.1±1.8 L_{☉}
Temperature	8,558±300 (polar); 6,574±200 (equator) K
Metallicity [Fe/H]	+0.09 dex
Rotation	12.11±0.26 hours
Rotational velocity (v sin i)	283±19 km/s
Age	990±70 Myr

Other designations
- Alderamin, α Cep, 5 Cep, AG+62°1226, BD+61°2111, FK5 803, GJ 826, HD 203280, HIP 105199, HR 8162, SAO 19302, CCDM J21186+6236A, 2MASS J21183475+6235081

Database references
SIMBAD	data

Alpha Cephei is a second magnitude star in the northern constellation of Cepheus. It has the official name Alderamin, pronounced /ælˈdɛrəmɪn/; Alpha Cephei is its Bayer designation, which is Latinized from α Cephei and abbreviated Alpha Cep or α Cep. The star is relatively close to Earth at 49 light years (ly) and drifting closer with a heliocentric radial velocity of about −16 km/s.

== Nomenclature ==
α Cephei (Latinised to Alpha Cephei) is the star's Bayer designation. It has a Flamsteed designation of 5 Cephei.

It bore the traditional name Alderamin, a contraction of the Arabic phrase الذراع اليمين al-dhirā‘ al-yamīn, meaning "the right arm". In 2016, the International Astronomical Union organized a Working Group on Star Names (WGSN) to catalog and standardize proper names for stars. The WGSN's first bulletin of July 2016 included a table of the first two batches of names approved by the WGSN; which included Alderamin for this star.

== Visibility ==
With a declination in excess of 62 degrees north, Alpha Cephei never rises south of −27° latitude, which means for much of South America, Australia, South Africa, and all of New Zealand, the star stays below the horizon. The star is circumpolar throughout all of Europe, northern Asia, Canada, and American cities as far south as San Diego. Since Alpha Cephei has an apparent magnitude of about 2.5, the star is the brightest in the constellation and is easily observable to the naked eye, even in light-polluted cities.

=== Pole star ===
Alpha Cephei is located near the precessional path traced across the celestial sphere by the Earth's North pole. That means that it periodically comes within 3° of being a pole star, a title currently held by Polaris. Alpha Cephei will next be the North Star in about the year 7500 AD. The north pole of Mars points to the midpoint of the line connecting the star and Deneb.

Preceded by	Pole Star	Succeeded by
Iota Cephei	circa 19,000BC and 7500AD to 8700AD	Deneb

== Properties ==
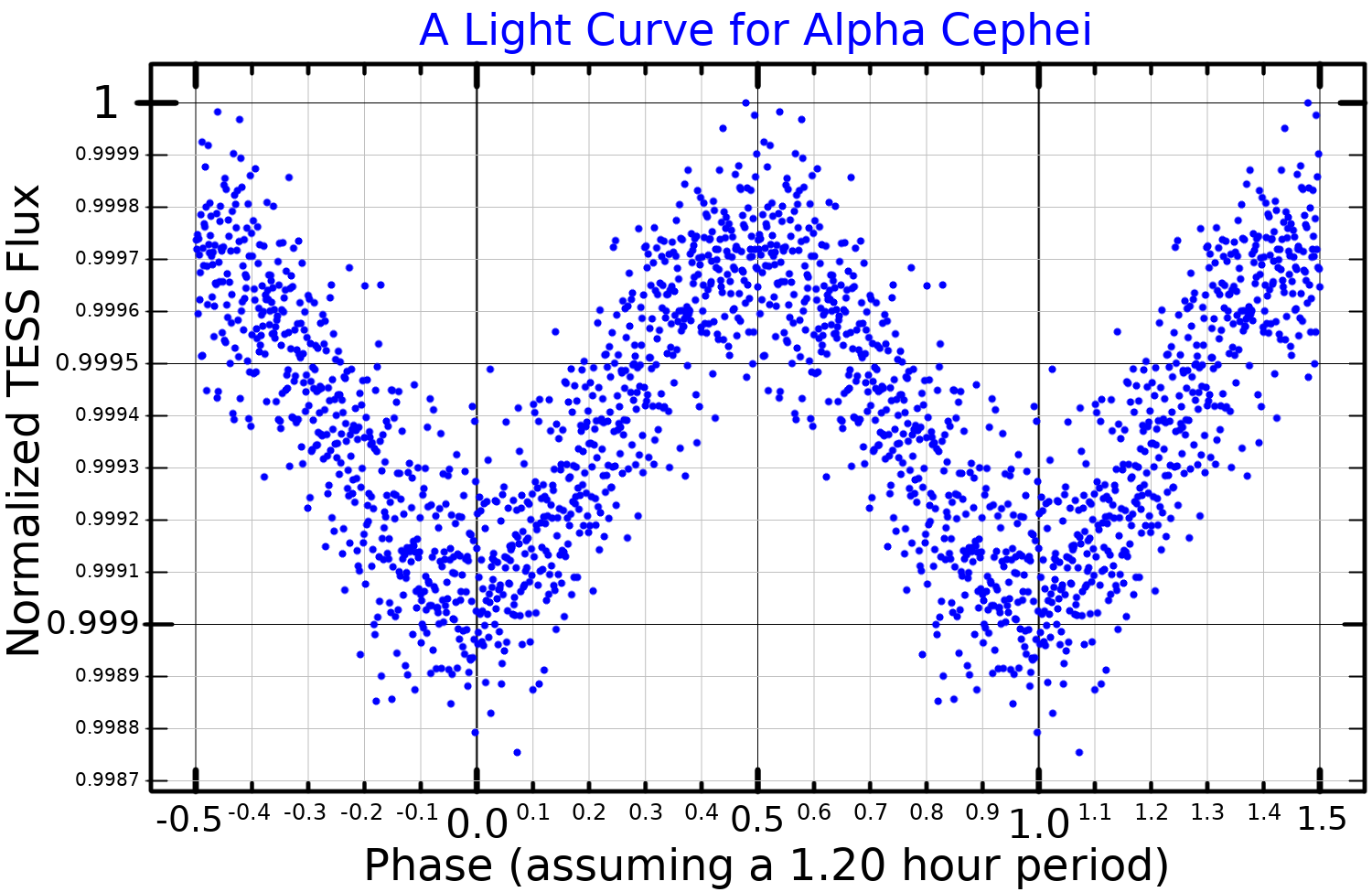
A light curve for Alpha Cephei, plotted from TESS data

Alderamin is a white class A star, evolving off the main sequence into a subgiant, probably on its way to becoming a red giant as its hydrogen supply runs low. On average, Alderamin has an apparent magnitude of 2.46. In 2007, the star's parallax was measured at 66.50±0.11 mas yielding a distance of 15 parsecs or approximately 49 light years from Earth.

Interferometry by the CHARA array show that Alderamin has an oblate shape, its equatorial size measures 2.74 R_{☉} and the polar radius measures 2.16 R_{☉}. The star's temperature varies as well, from 8,558 K in the poles to 6,574 K in the equator. A more recent but less detailed measurement by the Navy Precision Optical Interferometer gives 2.71 R_{☉}, which likely corresponds to the equatorial radius. The star is a hybrid pulsator, showing both Delta Scuti and Gamma Doradus pulsations. The amplitude is of only 0.002 magnitudes.

Alderamin has a very high rotation speed of at least 246 km/s, completing one complete revolution in less than 12 hours, with such a rapid turnover appearing to inhibit the differentiation of chemical elements usually seen in such stars. By comparison, the Sun takes almost a month to turn on its axis. Alpha Cephei is also known to emit an amount of X radiation similar to the Sun, which along with other indicators suggests the existence of considerable magnetic activity—something unexpected (though not at all unusual) for a fast rotator.

== Etymology and cultural significance ==
This star, along with Beta Cephei (Alfirk) and Eta Cephei (Alkidr) were al-Kawākib al-Firq (الكواكب الفرق), meaning "the Stars of the Flock" by Ulug Beg.

In Chinese, 天鈎 (Tiān Gōu), meaning Celestial Hook, refers to an asterism consisting of α Cephei, 4 Cephei, HD 194298, Eta Cephei, Theta Cephei, Xi Cephei, 26 Cephei, Iota Cephei and Omicron Cephei. Consequently, the Chinese name for Alpha Cephei itself is 天鈎五 (Tiān Gōu wu, English: the Fifth Star of the Celestial Hook.).

Alderamin on the Sky is a Japanese light novel series named after the star.

=== Namesakes ===
USS Alderamin (AK-116) was a United States Navy Crater class cargo ship named after the star.

== See also ==
- List of nearest bright stars
- Dwarf star
