= Pi Cassiopeiae =

Variable star in the constellation Cassiopeia

- Location of π Cassiopeiae (circled)

Observation data Epoch J2000.0 Equinox J2000.0 (ICRS)
- Constellation: Cassiopeia
- Right ascension: 00^{h} 43^{m} 28.070^{s}
- Declination: +47° 01′ 28.36″
- Apparent magnitude (V): +4.949

Characteristics
- Evolutionary stage: Main sequence
- Spectral type: A5V + A5V
- B−V color index: +0.171
- Variable type: Ellipsoidal

Astrometry
| Radial velocity (R_{v}) | +12.9±0.8 km/s |
| Proper motion (μ) | RA: −24.570 mas/yr Dec.: −36.886 mas/yr |
| Parallax (π) | 18.6293±0.1142 mas |
| Distance | 175 ± 1 ly (53.7 ± 0.3 pc) |
| Absolute magnitude (M_{V}) | +1.30 |

Orbit
| Period (P) | 1.9642 d |
| Eccentricity (e) | 0.00 |
| Periastron epoch (T) | 2427535.74 JD |
| Argument of periastron (ω) (secondary) | 0.00° |
| Semi-amplitude (K_{1}) (primary) | 120.5 km/s |
| Semi-amplitude (K_{2}) (secondary) | 122.1 km/s |

Details

A
| Mass | 1.82 M_{☉} |
| Radius | 1.9 R_{☉} |
| Luminosity | 22 L_{☉} |
| Surface gravity (log g) | 4.41 cgs |
| Temperature | 8,392±285 K |
| Rotational velocity (v sin i) | 60 km/s |
| Age | 251 Myr |

B
| Mass | 1.87 M_{☉} |
| Radius | 1.9 R_{☉} |
| Rotational velocity (v sin i) | 65 km/s |

Other designations
- π Cas, 20 Cas, BD+46°146, HD 4058, HIP 3414, HR 184, SAO 36602

Database references
| SIMBAD | data |

Pi Cassiopeiae is a close binary star system in the constellation Cassiopeia, near the southern border with Andromeda. Its name is a Bayer designation that is Latinized from π Cassiopeiae, and abbreviated Pi Cas or π Cas. This system is visible to the naked eye as a point of light with a combined apparent visual magnitude of +4.949. Based upon an annual parallax shift of 18.63 mas as seen from Earth, this system is located about 175 light-years (54 pc) 175 light years from the Sun. It is drifting further away with a radial velocity of +13 km/s.

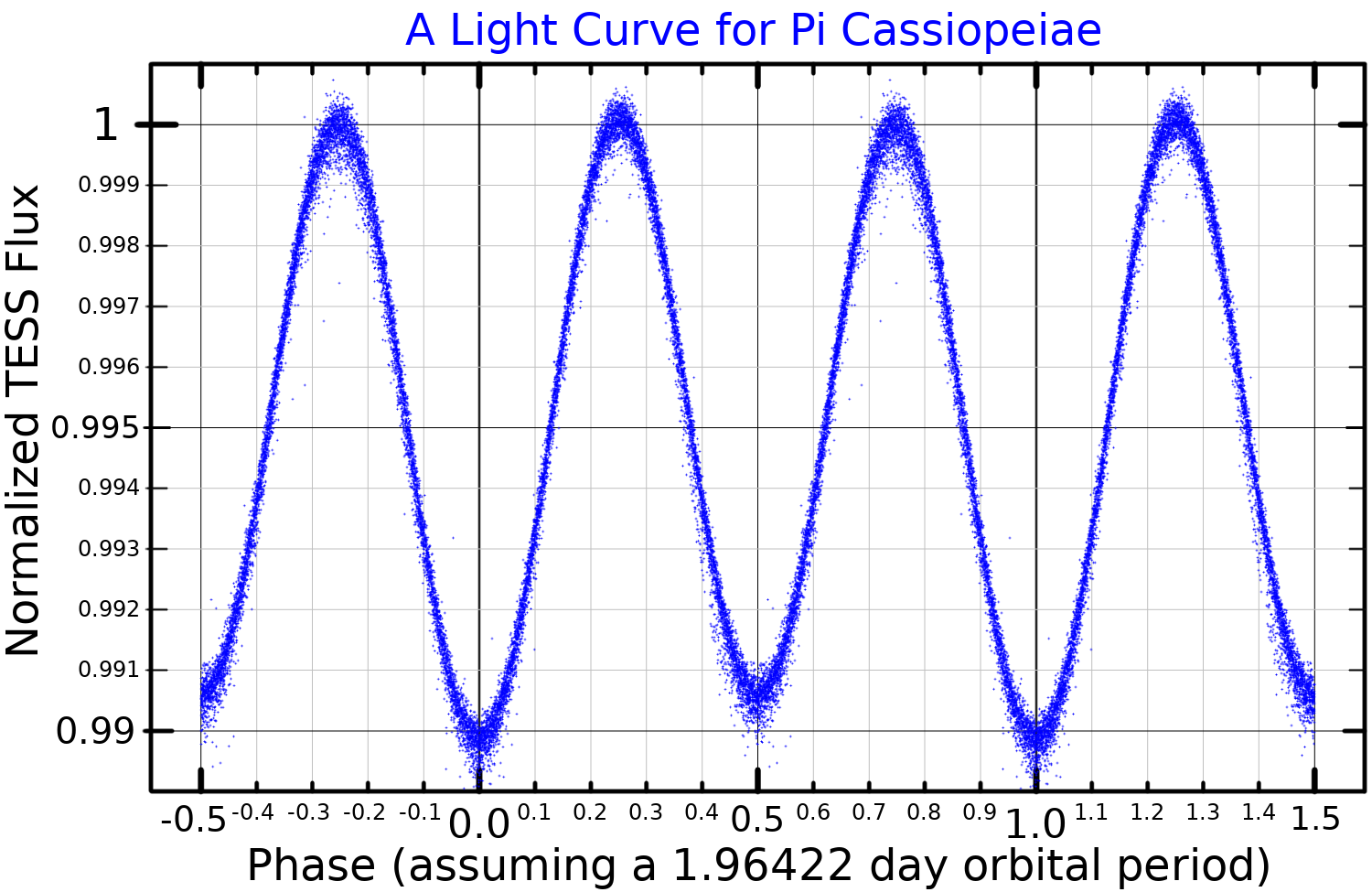
A light curve for Pi Cassiopeiae, plotted from TESS data

This is a double-lined spectroscopic binary system with an orbital period of nearly two days in a circular orbit. It is classified as a rotating ellipsoidal variable star and its brightness varies by 0.02 magnitudes with a period of 23.57 hours, which equals half of its orbital period. The spectrum matches that of an A-type main-sequence star with a stellar classification of A5 V. The two stars have similar masses and spectra. A star at a projected separation of 1,700 AU has been identified as a possible white dwarf. It is at the same distance as Pi Cassiopeiae and shares a common proper motion. The age of the white dwarf is calculated to be about 500 million years.

Pi Cassiopeiae has been given the spectral class of kA3hF1mA5, indicating an Am star, but this is now considered doubtful.
