= Theta Crucis =

The Bayer designation Theta Crucis (θ Cru / θ Crucis) is shared by two star systems, in the constellation Crux:

- θ^{1} Crucis
- θ^{2} Crucis

The pair can be resolved with the naked eye and are not physically associated with each other.
