= HD 861 =

Spectroscopic binary in the constellation Cassiopeia

- Location of HD 861 (circled)

Observation data Epoch J2000 Equinox ICRS
- Constellation: Cassiopeia
- Right ascension: 00^{h} 13^{m} 12.73037^{s}
- Declination: +62° 02′ 27.1598″
- Apparent magnitude (V): 6.622

Characteristics
- Spectral type: A2m + GV
- B−V color index: +0.208

Astrometry
Radial velocity (R_{v})	8.80±6.28 km/s
Proper motion (μ)	RA: 72.804 mas/yr Dec.: -19.171 mas/yr
Parallax (π)	8.0883±0.0269 mas
Distance	403 ± 1 ly (123.6 ± 0.4 pc)
Absolute magnitude (M_{V})	1.30 (A), 5.62 (B)

Orbit
Primary	HD 861 A
Name	HD 861 B
Period (P)	15.9696 d
Eccentricity (e)	0.124

Details

HD 861 A
Mass	2.04 M_{☉}
Radius	2.775 ± 0.139 R_{☉}
Surface gravity (log g)	4.00 cgs
Temperature	8100 K
Metallicity [Fe/H]	0.44 dex
Rotational velocity (v sin i)	37 km/s
Age	724 Myr

HD 861 B
Mass	0.95 M_{☉}
Surface gravity (log g)	4.5 cgs
Temperature	5500 K

Other designations
- AG+61°8, BD+61°16, GC 233, HD 861, HIP 1063, SAO 11044, PPM 12017, TIC 83612641, TYC 4018-687-1, GSC 04018-00687, 2MASS J00131272+6202271, Renson 130

Database references
SIMBAD	HD 861

HD 861 is a spectroscopic binary star system in the deep northern constellation of Cassiopeia. With an apparent magnitude of 6.622, the star is faintly visible to the naked eye under very dark skies and readily visible using binoculars. It is located approximately 403 light-years (124 parsecs) distant according to Gaia DR3 parallax measurements, and is moving further away at a heliocentric radial velocity of 8.80 km/s.

== Stellar properties ==
The primary star is a typical Am star, enriched in iron and especially so in barium but depleted in carbon, oxygen and calcium. At an age of 724 million (10^{8.86}) years, it is currently a main-sequence star fusing hydrogen into helium at its core. It will continue to do so for the next 320 million years until it runs out of core hydrogen at 1.05 billion (10^{9.02}) years old, at which point it will leave the main sequence and enter the subgiant phase.

The secondary star is a G-type main-sequence star slightly less massive than the Sun and less than half as luminous.

== Orbit ==
The orbital properties of the companion were first determined in 1971 by Acker, with an orbital period of 11.2153 days and an eccentricity of 0.22. In 2002, however, Debernardi found an entirely different set of orbital parameters in his PhD thesis and also discovered the stellar spectra of the secondary star. This new orbit has a longer period of 15.9696 days and a lower eccentricity of 0.124. This was backed up by Budaj et al., who also independently found the secondary spectra and obtained a mass ratio between the two stars that agreed with Debernardi's research.
