= HD 125658 =

Star in the constellation Boötes

Observation data Epoch J2000 Equinox ICRS
- Constellation: Boötes
- Right ascension: 14^{h} 20^{m} 08.66452^{s}
- Declination: +30° 25′ 44.8555″
- Apparent magnitude (V): 6.34 - 6.45

Characteristics
- Spectral type: A5III (kA3hA4mF0)‍
- U−B color index: +0.10
- B−V color index: +0.16
- Variable type: Suspected

Astrometry
| Radial velocity (R_{v}) | +1.3 km/s |
| Proper motion (μ) | RA: −9.164 mas/yr Dec.: −5.971 mas/yr |
| Parallax (π) | 11.9629±0.1441 mas |
| Distance | 273 ± 3 ly (84 ± 1 pc) |
| Absolute magnitude (M_{V}) | +1.61 |

Details
| Mass | 2.0 M_{☉} |
| Radius | 2.0 R_{☉} |
| Luminosity | 17 L_{☉} |
| Surface gravity (log g) | 4.13 cgs |
| Temperature | 8,213 K |
| Metallicity [Fe/H] | −0.01 dex |
| Rotational velocity (v sin i) | 26 km/s |
| Age | 667 Myr |

Other designations
- BD+31°2605, HD 125658, HIP 70051, HR 5374, NSV 6633, SAO 64074

Database references
| SIMBAD | data |

HD 125658 is a candidate variable star in the northern constellation of Boötes. It is a hot giant star about 273 light years away.

One published spectral class, kA3hA4mF0, would identify HD 125658 as an Am star, but this chemical peculiarity is considered doubtful. The star's apparent magnitude has been reported to vary between 6.34 and 6.45, but this has not been confirmed.
