= B Persei =

Star in the constellation Perseus

b Persei
- Location of b Persei (circled)

Observation data Epoch J2000.0 Equinox ICRS
- Constellation: Perseus
- Right ascension: 04^{h} 18^{m} 14.61690^{s}
- Declination: +50° 17′ 43.8058″
- Apparent magnitude (V): 4.52 - 4.68

Characteristics
- Spectral type: A1III
- B−V color index: +0.04
- Variable type: Ellipsoidal

Astrometry
Radial velocity (R_{v})	19.8±0.9 km/s
Proper motion (μ)	RA: 45.42±0.40 mas/yr Dec.: −56.72±0.32 mas/yr
Parallax (π)	10.40±0.35 mas
Distance	310 ± 10 ly (96 ± 3 pc)
Absolute magnitude (M_{V})	0.3

Orbit
Primary	A or Aa
Name	B or Ab
Period (P)	1.52735997±0.00000036 days
Eccentricity (e)	0.0
Inclination (i)	22±3 or 55±3°
Periastron epoch (T)	2450001.0931±0.003

Orbit
Primary	AB
Name	C or Ac
Period (P)	703.06±0.07 days
Semi-major axis (a)	26.22±0.06 mas
Eccentricity (e)	0.185±0.003
Inclination (i)	90.5±0.1°
Longitude of the node (Ω)	120.0±0.1°
Periastron epoch (T)	2440080±3
Argument of periastron (ω) (secondary)	212±1°

Details

A or Aa
Mass	2.25 M_{☉}
Radius	3.2 R_{☉}
Luminosity	59 L_{☉}
Temperature	9,000 K
Rotational velocity (v sin i)	81 km/s

B or Ab
Mass	0.56 M_{☉}
Radius	0.25 R_{☉}
Luminosity	4.5 - 5.9 L_{☉}
Temperature	6,700 K

C or Ac
Mass	1.24 M_{☉}
Luminosity	2 L_{☉}

Other designations
- BD+49°1150, GC 5174, HD 26961, HR 1324, HIP 20070, SAO 24531

Database references
SIMBAD	data

b Persei (also known as HD 26961) is a spectroscopic triple star in the constellation Perseus. Its apparent magnitude is 4.60, making it visible to the naked eye. It is about 320 light years away.

In addition to the primary, an A-type giant, there is a smaller and cooler companion in a 1.53 day orbit, probably an F-class star around absolute magnitude 3.0, and a more distant companion (star C or Ac) in an orbit calculated to be 702 days long. The close binary pair forms a rotating ellipsoidal variable with a 1.53 day period. Star C forms an Algol-type variable system with the close binary, showing both primary eclipses (when star C passes in front of the inner pair) and secondary eclipses (when the inner pair passes in front of star C). Timings of the eclipses show a 704.5-day period.

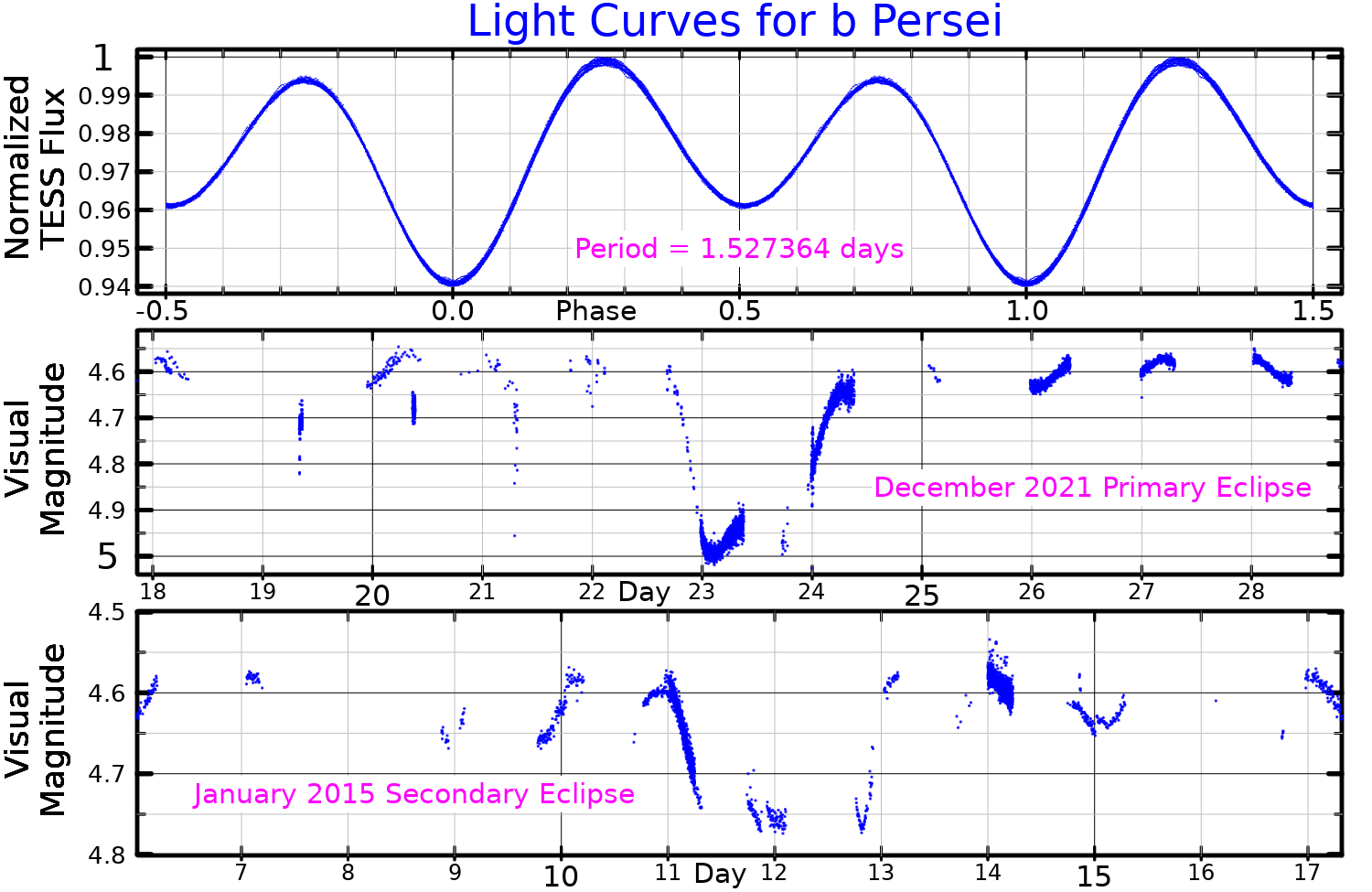
Light curves for b Persei. The top panel, plotted from TESS data, shows the variability of the inner binary pair. The lower panels, plotted from AAVSO data, show two eclipses.
