= USS Alderamin =

Cargo ship of the United States Navy

History

United States
- Name: J. S. Cullinan; Alderamin
- Namesake: Joseph S. Cullinan; Alderamin
- Ordered: as a type (EC2-S-C1) hull, MCE hull 1963, SS J. S. Cullinan
- Builder: Todd Houston Shipbuilding Co., Houston, Texas
- Laid down: 5 October 1943
- Launched: 13 November 1943
- Acquired: 25 November 1943
- Commissioned: 25 November 1943
- Decommissioned: 29 November 1943
- In service: 3 April 1944
- Out of service: 10 April 1946
- Stricken: 1 May 1946
- Identification: Hull symbol:AK-116
- Fate: Sold for scrapping in 1965

General characteristics
- Class & type: Crater-class cargo ship
- Displacement: 4,023 long tons (4,088 t) (standard); 14,550 long tons (14,780 t) (full load)
- Length: 441 ft 6 in (134.57 m)
- Beam: 56 ft 11 in (17.35 m)
- Draft: 28 ft 4 in (8.64 m)
- Installed power: 2 × Babcock & Wilcox header-type boilers, 220psi 450°; 2,500 shp (1,900 kW)
- Propulsion: 1 × National Transit Pump & Machine Co triple-expansion reciprocating steam engine; 1 × shaft
- Speed: 12.5 kn (23.2 km/h; 14.4 mph)
- Complement: 206
- Armament: 1 × 5 in (130 mm)/38-caliber dual-purpose gun; 4 × 40 mm (1.6 in) 40mm Bofors anti-aircraft gun mounts; 6 × 20 mm (0.79 in) Oerlikon cannons anti-aircraft gun mounts

USS Alderamin (AK-116) was a Crater-class cargo ship commissioned by the U.S. Navy for service in World War II, named after Alderamin, the alpha star in constellation Cepheus. She was responsible for delivering troops, goods and equipment to locations in the war zone.

== Service history ==
SS J. S. Cullinan was laid down under a Maritime Commission contract (MCE hull 1963) on 5 October 1943 at Houston, Texas, by the Houston Shipbuilding Co.; launched on 13 November 1943; acquired by the Navy and placed in temporary commission as Alderamin (AK-116) on 25 November 1943; proceeded to Mobile, Alabama, and decommissioned on 29 November 1943 to undergo conversion for naval service as a cargo ship; and recommissioned at Mobile on 3 April 1944. Following shakedown training in the Chesapeake Bay, Alderamin sailed to New York City to load cargo for transportation to the Pacific Ocean. The vessel made a port call at Guantanamo Bay, Cuba, before transiting the Panama Canal and reporting to the U.S. Pacific Fleet on 28 May. She departed the Panama Canal Zone the next day and proceeded independently to Espiritu Santo, New Hebrides.

The vessel arrived there on 28 June and began operations with Service Squadron 8, Service Force, Pacific Fleet, as an interisland cargo transport. Among her ports of call were Suva, Fiji Islands; Noumea, New Caledonia; Guadalcanal, Bougainville, Tulagi and Green Island, Solomon Islands; Russell Islands, Treasury Islands; Manus, Admiralty Islands; Wellington, New Zealand; Eniwetok, Marshall Islands; Iwo Jima, Bonin Islands; Guam, Mariana Islands; and Ulithi, Caroline Islands. Alderamin was moored at Okinawa Island at the time of the Japanese capitulation on 15 August 1945. Sailor Nathan Underwood remembered the day the war ended while he was anchored at Okinawa. He said "You could walk on the bullets in the air" during the celebration. She got underway two days later to return to the United States.

The vessel made port calls at Eniwetok and Pearl Harbor, Hawaii, before arriving at San Francisco, California, on 22 September. She sailed once again on 24 October, bound for Shanghai, China. She touched at Pearl Harbor, Guam, and Samar, Philippine Islands, before reaching Shanghai on 8 December. After taking on military personnel for passage back to the United States, Alderamin got underway again on the 11th. On 1 February 1946, she arrived back at San Francisco and debarked her passengers. She then began preparations for deactivation. Alderamin was decommissioned on 10 April 1946 and was delivered to the War Shipping Administration for disposal. Her name was struck from the Navy list on 1 May 1946. The ship was later scrapped.

== External linkshttp://firstpreslakewales.org/blog/2012/11/10/the-greatest-generation-nathan-underwood/ ==
- Photo gallery of Alderamin at NavSource Naval History
