= Rotating ellipsoidal variable =

Class of variable star

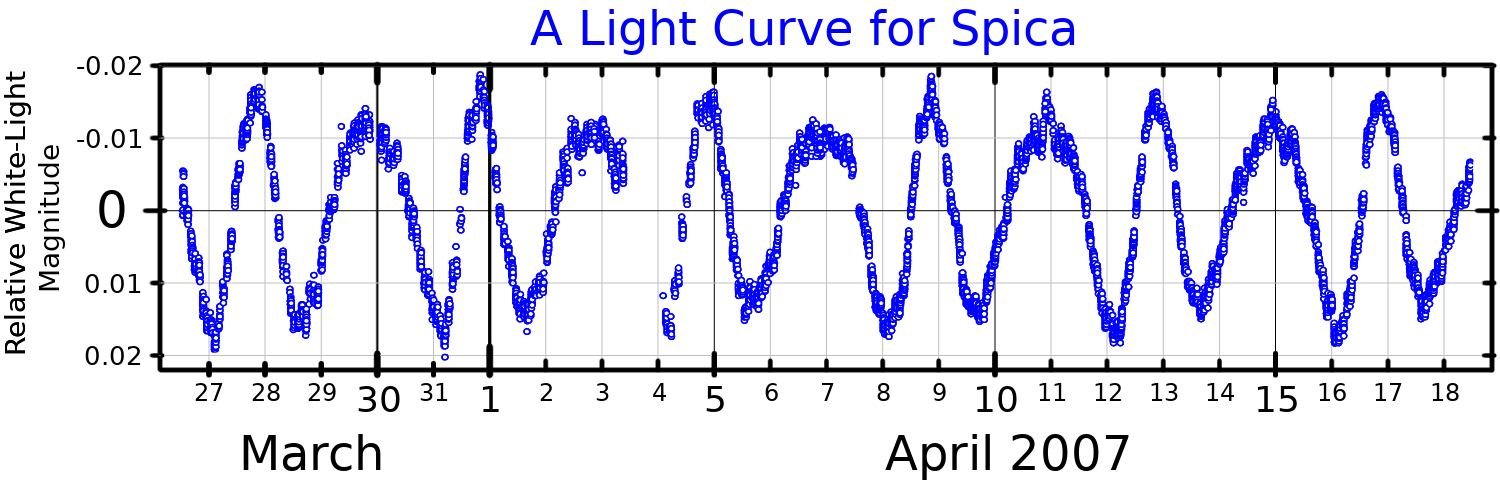
A light curve for Spica, adapted from Tkachenko et al. (2016)

Rotating ellipsoidal variables are a class of close binary variable star systems whose components are ellipsoidal. They are not eclipsing, but fluctuations in apparent magnitude occur due to changes in the amount of light emitting area visible to the observer. Typical brightness fluctuations do not exceed 0.1 magnitudes.

The brightest rotating ellipsoidal variable is Spica (α Virginis).

== List of variables ==
List of Rotating ellipsoidal variables
Designation (name)	Constellation	Discovery	Apparent magnitude (Maximum)	Apparent magnitude (Minimum)	Range of magnitude	Spectral type	Comment
Spica (α Virginis)	Virgo	Ruban et al. (2006)	0.97	1.04	0.07	B1 III-IV + B2 V	Brightest member; binary
α Trianguli (Mothallah)	Triangulum	Ruban et al. (2006)	3.52 (Hp)	3.53 (Hp)	0.01	F5 III + M	
π^{5} Orionis	Orion	Ruban et al. (2006)	3.66	3.73	0.07	B2 III + B6 V	
b Persei	Perseus	Ruban et al. (2006)	4.52	4.68	0.07	A2 V	
68 Cygni (V1809 Cyg)	Cygnus		4.98	5.09	0.11	O7.5 IIIn((f))	Variability is disputable
π Cassiopeiae	Cassiopeia	Paunzen & Maitzen (1998)	4.95	4.97	0.02	A5 V + A5 V	
31 Crateris (TY Corvi)	Corvus		5.19	5.23	0.04	B1.5 V	Unknown companion
14 Cephei (LZ Cephei)	Cepheus	Morris (1985)	4.67	4.71	0.04	O9 III + O9.5 V	
HZ Canis Majoris	Canis Major		5.28	5.34	0.06	A0 EuCrSr	Long 6.4 year period;binary
