= Beta Cephei =

Star in the constellation Cepheus

β Cephei
- Location of β Cephei (circled)

Observation data Epoch J2000 Equinox ICRS
- Constellation: Cepheus
- Right ascension: 21^{h} 28^{m} 39.59685^{s}
- Declination: +70° 33′ 38.5747″
- Apparent magnitude (V): 3.16 to 3.27

Characteristics
- Spectral type: B1 IV
- U−B color index: –0.95
- B−V color index: –0.22
- Variable type: β Cep

Astrometry
Radial velocity (R_{v})	−8.2 km/s
Proper motion (μ)	RA: +12.54 mas/yr Dec.: +8.39 mas/yr
Parallax (π)	4.76±0.30 mas
Distance	690 ± 40 ly (210 ± 10 pc)
Absolute magnitude (M_{V})	−3.03

Orbit
Primary	β Cep Aa
Name	β Cep Ab
Period (P)	29616.54±1.36 d
Semi-major axis (a)	206.96±0.53 mas
Eccentricity (e)	0.7478±0.0005
Inclination (i)	88.80±0.07°
Longitude of the node (Ω)	227.83±0.14°
Periastron epoch (T)	2450944.5±24.2
Argument of periastron (ω) (secondary)	202.43±0.31°
Semi-amplitude (K_{1}) (primary)	9.63±0.26 km/s

Details

β Cep Aa
Mass	7.4 M_{☉}
Radius	7.22±0.42 R_{☉}
Luminosity	20,000+5,200 −4,100 L_{☉}
Surface gravity (log g)	4.12±0.07 cgs
Temperature	23,600±1,000 K
Metallicity [Fe/H]	−0.23 dex
Rotational velocity (v sin i)	28 km/s
Age	8.7 Myr

β Cep Ab
Mass	5.0 M_{☉}

Other designations
- Alfirk, β Cep, 8 Cephei, AAVSO 2127+70, AG+70°738, BD+69°1173, FK5 809, HD 205021, HIP 106032, HR 8238, SAO 10057, CCDM J21287+7034A, WDS J21287+7034, GSC 04465-02643

Database references
SIMBAD	data

Beta Cephei is a triple star system in the northern constellation of Cepheus. Its name is a Bayer designation that is Latinized from β Cephei, and abbreviated Beta Cep or β Cep. This system is a visible to the naked eye as a point of light with a combined apparent visual magnitude that ranges from 3.16 to 3.27, making it a third magnitude star. Based on parallax measurements obtained during the Hipparcos mission, it is approximately 690 light-years distant from the Sun. It is the prototype of the Beta Cephei variable stars.

It consists of a binary pair (designated Beta Cephei A) together with a third companion (B). The binary's two components are themselves designated Beta Cephei Aa (officially named Alfirk /ˈælfərk/, the traditional name for the system) and Ab.

== Nomenclature ==
β Cephei (Latinised to Beta Cephei) is the system's Bayer designation. The designations of the two constituents as Beta Cephei A and B, and those of A's components - Beta Cephei Aa and Ab - derive from the convention used by the Washington Multiplicity Catalog (WMC) for multiple star systems, and adopted by the International Astronomical Union (IAU).

Beta Cephei bore the traditional name Alfirk, derived from the Arabic الفرقة al-firqah "the flock" (of sheep). With Alpha Cephei (Alderamin) and Eta Cephei (Alkidr), they were Al Kawākib al Firḳ الكوكب الفرق "the stars of the flock" by Ulug Beg. In 2016, the IAU organized a Working Group on Star Names (WGSN) to catalogue and standardize proper names for stars. The WGSN decided to attribute proper names to individual stars rather than entire multiple systems. It approved the name Alfirk for the component Beta Cephei Aa on 21 August 2016 and it is now so included in the List of IAU-approved Star Names.

== Visibility ==
Like the star Epsilon Draconis in the constellation of Draco, Beta Cephei is visible primarily in the Northern Hemisphere, given its extreme northern declination of 70 degrees and 34 minutes. It is nevertheless visible to most observers throughout the world reaching as far south as cities like Harare in Zimbabwe, Santa Cruz de la Sierra in Bolivia or other settlements north ± 19° South latitude. It is circumpolar throughout all of Europe, northern Asia, and North American cities as far south as Guadalajara in west central Mexico. All other locations around the globe having a latitude greater than ± 20° North will notice that the star is always visible in the night sky. Because Beta Cephei is a faint third magnitude star, it may be difficult to identify in most light polluted cities, though in rural locations the star should be easily observable.

== Pole Star ==
Beta Cephei is a visible star located within 5° of the precessional path traced across the celestial sphere by the Earth's North pole. During the same period Iota Cephei will also be within 5° of the precessional path, on the other side so that both are in contention as pole stars, a title currently held by unambiguously by Polaris.

Preceded by	Pole Star	Succeeded by
Errai	5200AD to 7500AD with Iota Cephei	Alderamin

== Properties ==
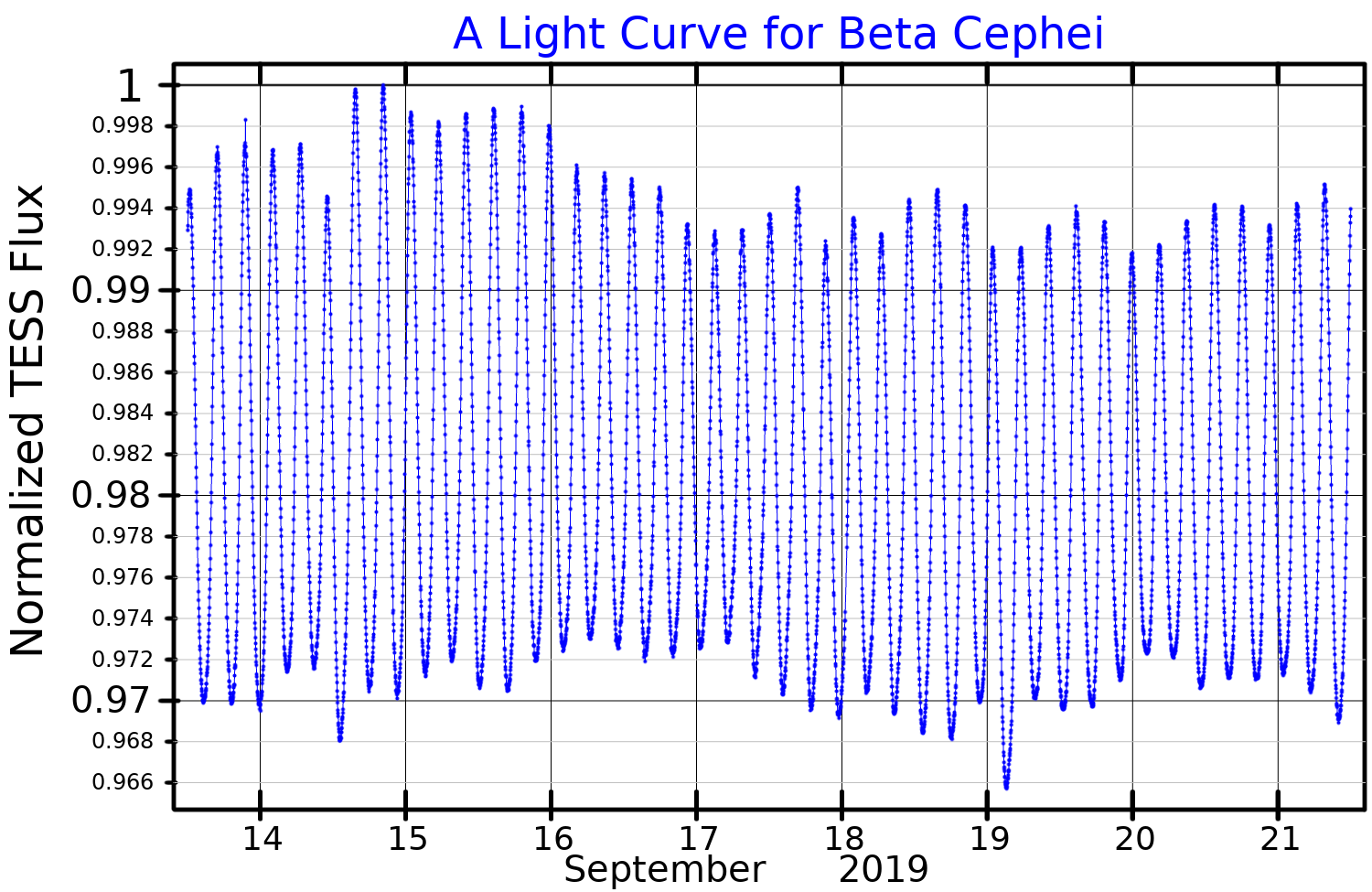
A light curve for Beta Cephei, plotted from TESS data

Beta Cephei is a triple star comprising a spectroscopic binary with a magnitude 8 optical companion. Its magnitude varies between +3.16 and +3.27 with a period of 0.19048 days.

Beta Cephei Aa is a blue subgiant star with a stellar classification of B1 IV. It has previously been classified with either a main sequence or giant luminosity class. This star has a radius that has been estimated at 7.2 R_{☉} and a mass of 7 M_{☉}. Other sources have given higher masses on the order of 12 M_{☉}. Like most high-mass B-class stars, Beta Cephei Aa is a relatively young star with an estimated age of just a few million years. Like the majority of giant stars, it rotates slowly on its axis with a rotational velocity of 7 deg/day, a speed which takes the star approximately 51 days to make one complete revolution.

Beta Cephei Ab is a Be star in an 81-year orbit with the giant primary. It has been resolved using speckle interferometry at a distance of 0.25" in 1972. With a mass of about 5 M_{☉}, it is likely a B-class star with a classification of B6.

B Cephei B is a magnitude 7.8 A2 main sequence star 13.6" distant.

== Variability ==
Beta Cephei pulsates regularly every 4 hours 34 minutes, producing a variation in its visual brightness of 0.11 magnitudes. It is the prototype of the Beta Cephei class of variables, hot main sequence and giant stars that pulsate analogously to Cepheid variables but with the pulsations driven by iron opacity rather than by helium.
