= USS Arided =

Cargo ship of the United States Navy

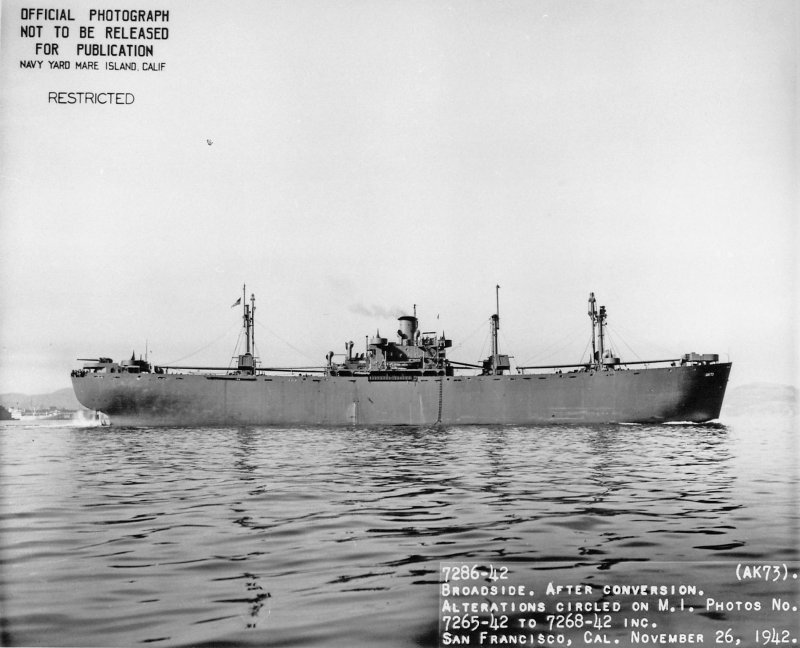
- Broadside view of USS Arided (AK-73), off Mare Island, 26 November 1942.

History

United States
- Name: Noah H. Swayne; Arided
- Namesake: Noah H. Swayne; The star Arided
- Ordered: as a Type EC2-S-C1 hull, MCE hull 500
- Builder: Permanente Metals Corporation, Richmond, California
- Cost: $1,166,244
- Yard number: 500
- Way number: 3
- Laid down: 20 September 1942
- Launched: 28 October 1942
- Sponsored by: Mrs. D. W. Fernhout
- Acquired: 12 November 1942
- Commissioned: 23 November 1942
- Decommissioned: 12 January 1946
- Renamed: Arided, 30 October 1942
- Stricken: 29 January 1947
- Identification: Hull symbol: AK-73; Code letters: NXZW
- Honors and awards: 2 × battle stars (World War II)
- Fate: Sold for scrapping, 7 August 1962, completed, 7 March 1963

General characteristics
- Class & type: Crater-class cargo ship
- Type: Type EC2-S-C1
- Displacement: 4,023 long tons (4,088 t) (standard); 14,550 long tons (14,780 t) (full load)
- Length: 441 ft 6 in (134.57 m)
- Beam: 56 ft 11 in (17.35 m)
- Draft: 28 ft 4 in (8.64 m)
- Installed power: 2 × Oil fired 450 °F (232 °C) boilers, operating at 220 psi (1,500 kPa) , (manufactured by Babcock & Wilcox); 2,500 shp (1,900 kW)
- Propulsion: 1 × Vertical triple-expansion reciprocating steam engine, (manufactured by Joshua Hendy); 1 × screw propeller
- Speed: 12.5 kn (23.2 km/h; 14.4 mph)
- Capacity: 7,800 t (7,700 long tons) DWT; 444,206 cu ft (12,578.5 m^{3}) (non-refrigerated)
- Complement: 195
- Armament: 1 × 5 in (130 mm)/38 caliber dual-purpose gun; 4 × 40 mm (1.6 in) 40mm Bofors anti-aircraft gun mounts; 6 × 20 mm (0.79 in) Oerlikon cannons anti-aircraft gun mounts

USS Arided (AK-73), a Crater-class cargo ship, is the only ship of the US Navy to have this name. She was named after Arided, the other name of Deneb, the alpha star of constellation Cygnus.

== Construction ==
Arided was laid down under a Maritime Commission (MARCOM) contract as liberty ship SS Noah H. Swayne, MC hull 500, 20 September 1942 at Richmond, California, by the Permanente Metals Corporation, Yard No. 1; launched on 28 October 1942; sponsored by Mrs. D. W. Fernhout; renamed Arided and designated AK-73 on 30 October 1942; acquired by the Navy on 12 November 1942; converted for naval service by the Matson Maintenance Co., San Francisco, California; and placed in commission at San Francisco on 23 November 1942.

== Service history ==
The new cargo ship was assigned to Service Squadron (ServRon) 8, Pacific Fleet, and took on a cargo of ammunition, gasoline, and other war supplies before sailing, via Pago Pago, American Samoa, on 4 December for the New Hebrides. The ship reached Espiritu Santo on Christmas Day and commenced operations with the Third Fleet. From January to July 1943, Arided carried cargoes of ammunition and gasoline from Auckland, New Zealand, and Nouméa, New Caledonia, to various points in the Solomon and Russell Islands.

In August 1943, the cargo vessel sailed to Port Chalmers, New Zealand, for a brief period of drydocking and repair work. She then resumed her routine of supply runs to the Solomon Islands. During 1944 and the first few months of 1945, Arided carried military supplies and equipment to various island bases in the South Pacific. Among her ports of call were Guadalcanal, Florida Island, and Bougainville, Solomon Islands; Milne Bay, New Guinea; Nouméa, New Caledonia; Manus, Admiralty Islands; Russell Islands; Peleliu, Palau Islands; and Funafuti, Ellice Islands.

Arided sailed to Espiritu Santo in April 1945 and took on supplies and equipment earmarked to help troops struggling for control of bitterly contested Okinawa. She arrived off Hagushi beach, Okinawa, on 18 June. While the ship was discharging her cargo, several enemy air raids took place, but she suffered no damage and continued her unloading. On 2 July, the vessel sailed for Guadalcanal and Espiritu Santo to take on more supplies. After making stops en route at Eniwetok and Ulithi, Arided arrived at Buckner Bay, Okinawa, on 18 August, three days after learning that Japan had capitulated.

On 26 October, Arided completed discharging her cargo and got underway for Pearl Harbor, Hawaii. The vessel arrived there on 14 November and remained in Hawaiian waters until she was decommissioned on 12 January 1946. The ship was then towed to San Francisco for final disposition. Her name was struck from the Navy list on 29 September 1947.

== Final disposition ==
She was delivered to MARCOM at Suisun Bay, California, on 2 October 1947 for layup in the Suisun Bay Reserve Fleet. She was sold to National Metal and Steel Corporation, for $49,822.79 on 7 August 1962, for scrapping. She was removed, 22 August 1962. Her scrapping was completed 7 March 1963.

== Awards ==
Arided won two battle stars for her World War II service.

== Bibliography ==
- "Arided". Dictionary of American Naval Fighting Ships. Naval History and Heritage Command. 18 June 2015. This article incorporates text from this source, which is in the public domain.
- "Kaiser Permanente No. 1, Richmond CA". ShipbuildingHistory.com. 13 October 2010.
- "USS Arided (AK-73)". NavSource. 4 April 2014.
- "Arided (AK-73)". United States Department of Transportation. Archived from the original on 12 December 2019.
- "Noah H. Swayne". United States Department of Transportation. Archived from the original on 12 December 2019.
- "SS Noah H. Swayne".
