= WW Aurigae =

Binary star in the constellation Auriga

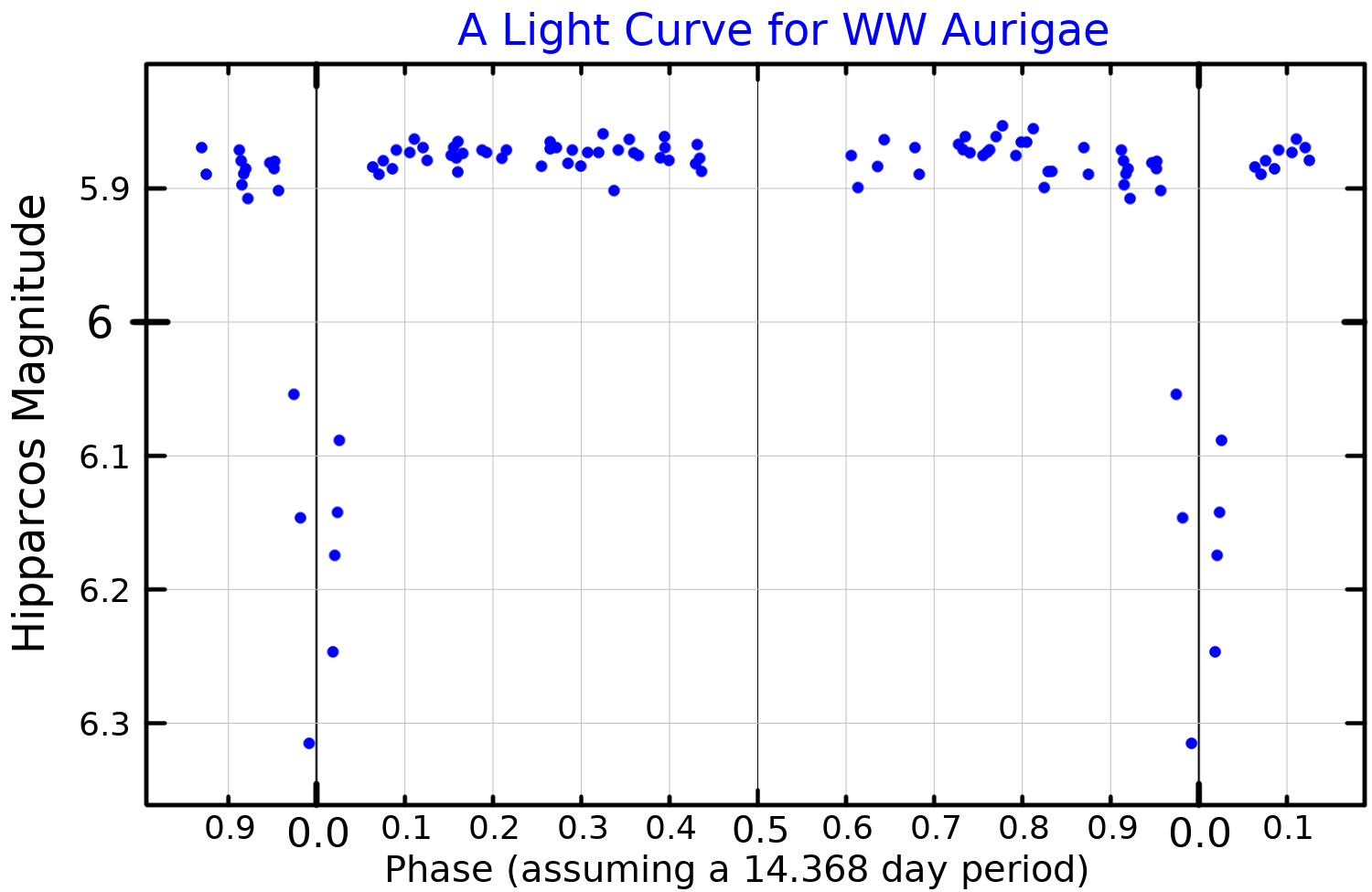
- A light curve for WW Aurigae, plotted from Hiparcos data

Observation data Epoch J2000 Equinox ICRS
- Constellation: Auriga
- Right ascension: 06^{h} 32^{m} 27.18477^{s}
- Declination: +32° 27′ 17.6324″
- Apparent magnitude (V): 5.82

Characteristics
- Spectral type: A4m + A5m
- B−V color index: 0.188±0.007
- Variable type: EA

Astrometry
Radial velocity (R_{v})	−9.1±0.2 km/s
Proper motion (μ)	RA: −26.3507 mas/yr Dec.: −17.343 mas/yr
Parallax (π)	11.1431±0.0691 mas
Distance	293 ± 2 ly (89.7 ± 0.6 pc)
Absolute magnitude (M_{V})	1.29

Orbit
Period (P)	2.525019±0.000001 days
Semi-major axis (a)	12.16±0.04 R_{☉}
Eccentricity (e)	0.00±0.01
Inclination (i)	87.560±0.002°
Periastron epoch (T)	2,459,317.031±0.001 HJD
Semi-amplitude (K_{1}) (primary)	117.6±0.3 km/s
Semi-amplitude (K_{2}) (secondary)	126.2±0.3 km/s

Details

WW Aur A
Mass	1.95±0.01 M_{☉}
Radius	1.94±0.02 R_{☉}
Luminosity	19.8±1.8 L_{☉}
Surface gravity (log g)	4.15±0.01 cgs
Temperature	8,750±200 K
Rotational velocity (v sin i)	37±4 km/s
Age	0.6±0.1 Gyr

WW Aur B
Mass	1.82±0.01 M_{☉}
Radius	1.85±0.02 R_{☉}
Luminosity	14.1±0.4 L_{☉}
Surface gravity (log g)	4.16±0.01 cgs
Temperature	8,250±200 K
Rotational velocity (v sin i)	37±4 km/s
Age	0.6±0.1 Gyr

Other designations
- WW Aur, BD+32°1324, FK5 2500, HD 46052, HIP 31173, HR 2372, SAO 59194

Database references
SIMBAD	data

WW Aurigae is an eclipsing binary star system in the northern constellation of Auriga. It has a combined maximum apparent visual magnitude of 5.86, which is bright enough to be dimly visible to the naked eye. Based upon an annual parallax shift of 11.1 mas, it is located 293 light years from the Earth. The system is moving further away with a heliocentric radial velocity of −9 km/s, having come to within 212.5 ly some 3.12 million years ago.

This is a double-lined spectroscopic binary system, having a circular orbit with a period of 2.525019 days. It was discovered to be variable independently by Friedrich Schwab and Heinrich Van Solowiew in 1918. It was given its variable star designation in 1919. Both components are metallic-lined, or Am stars, with a spectrum showing a deficiency of calcium and scandium, and an overabundance of heavier elements. Together they form an EA, or Algol-type, eclipsing binary with the primary occultation reducing the net magnitude to a minimum of 6.54 and the secondary eclipse lowering it to 6.43, over a cycle time of 2.52501936 days.
