= Xi Cygni =

Star in the constellation Cygnus

- Location of ξ Cygni (circled)

Observation data Epoch J2000 Equinox ICRS
- Constellation: Cygnus
- Right ascension: 21^{h} 04^{m} 55.8599^{s}
- Declination: +43° 55′ 40.272″
- Apparent magnitude (V): 3.73

Characteristics
- Spectral type: K4:Ib- + A1.5V
- U−B color index: +1.78
- B−V color index: +1.66

Astrometry
Radial velocity (R_{v})	−19.10 km/s
Proper motion (μ)	RA: +10.062 mas/yr Dec.: +0.861 mas/yr
Parallax (π)	2.8363±0.1269 mas
Distance	1,150 ± 50 ly (350 ± 20 pc)
Absolute magnitude (M_{V})	−4.3/+1.3

Orbit
Period (P)	6,750 ± 200 days
Semi-major axis (a)	~766 R_{☉}
Eccentricity (e)	0.25 ± 0.07
Inclination (i)	~50°

Details

Primary
Mass	~8 M_{☉}
Radius	220.09+9.64 −10.56 R_{☉}
Luminosity	9889±964 L_{☉}
Surface gravity (log g)	0.89 cgs
Temperature	3,878±33 – 4,031 K
Metallicity [Fe/H]	−0.26 dex

Secondary
Mass	~2.5 M_{☉}

Other designations
- ξ Cyg, 62 Cygni, FK5 792, GC 29459, HD 200905, HIP 104060, HR 8079, SAO 50424

Database references
SIMBAD	data

Xi Cygni is a binary star system in the constellation Cygnus. Its name is a Bayer designation that is Latinized from ξ Cygni and abbreviated Xi Cyg or ξ Cyg. The pair have a combined apparent visual magnitude of 3.73, making it readily visible to the naked eye as a point of light. Based on parallax measurements, the system is located at a distance of 350 parsecs (1,100 ly). At this distance, the apparent magnitude is diminished by 0.16 magnitudes from interstellar dust.

This spectroscopic binary system contains two stars which orbit every 18 years in a moderately eccentric orbit. The primary star is a supergiant with a spectral type of around K4, while the secondary is an A-type main-sequence star with a spectral type of A1.5. Stellar winds from the supergiant have been measured at around 50 km/s, but with variations in speed and individual line strengths.

ξ Cygni is in the Kepler spacecraft's field of view but no planets have been detected.

== Gallery ==
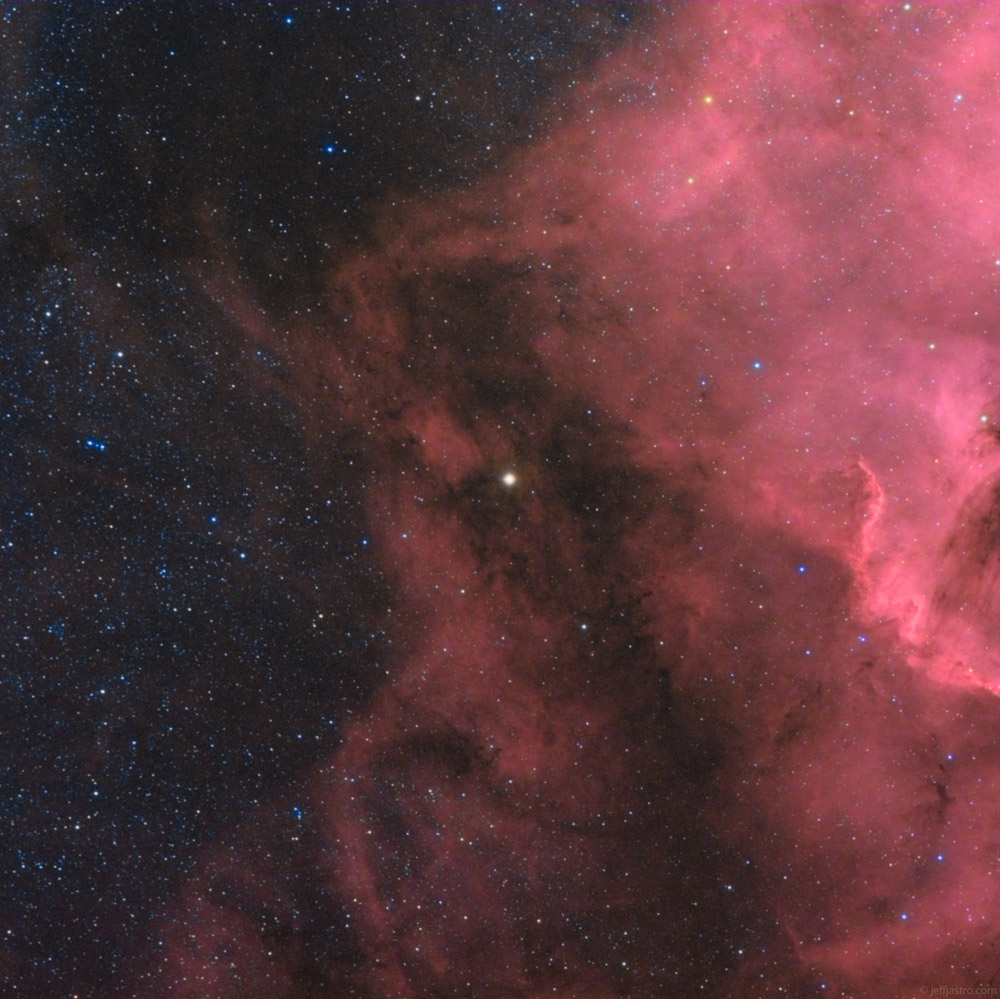
H-alpha RGB amateur image of ξ Cygni, center star, at edge of NGC7000

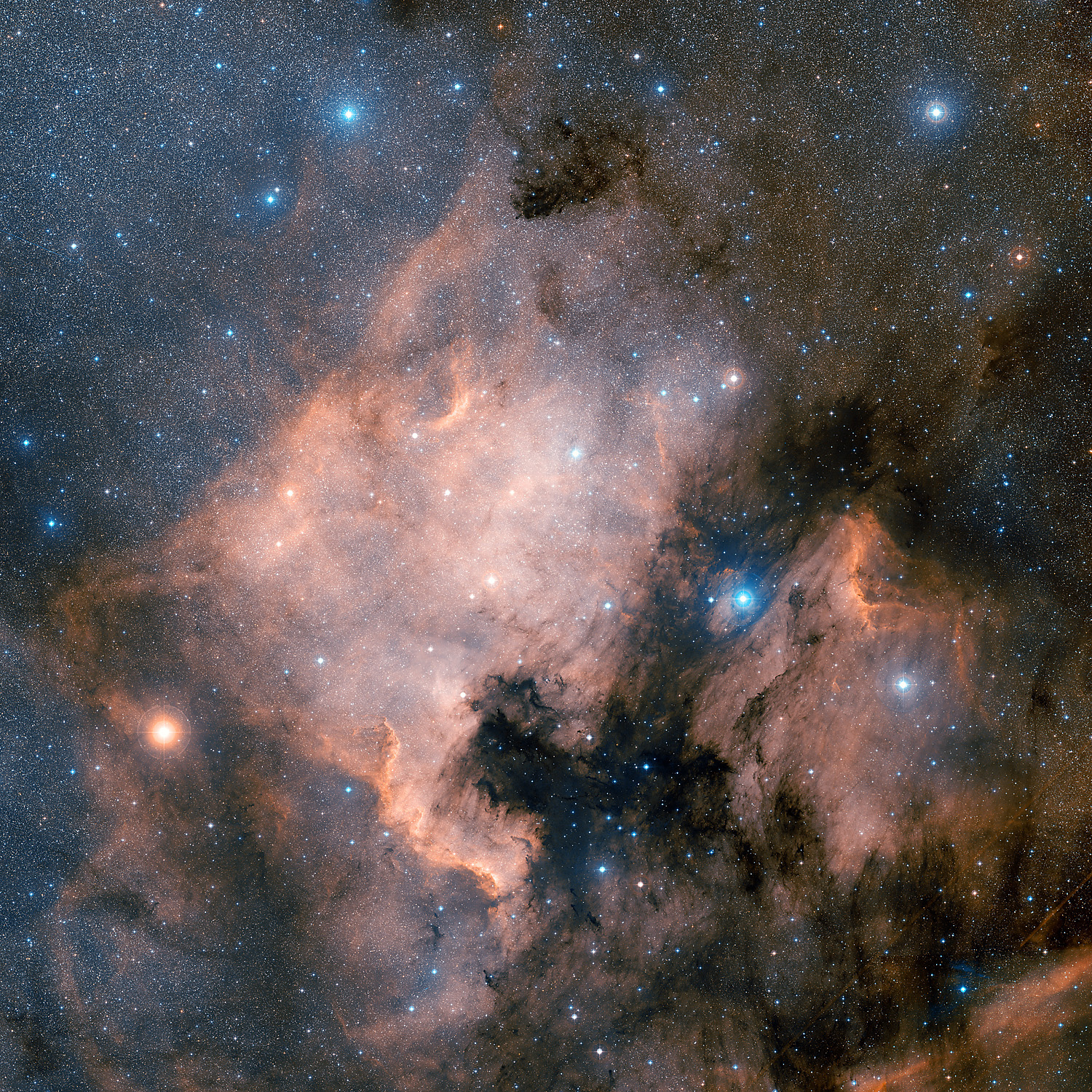
NGC 7000 (North America Nebula). ξ Cygni is the bright star on the left.
