= Theta1 Crucis =

Spectroscopic binary star system in the constellation Crux

θ^{1} Crucis
- Location of θ^{1} Crucis (circled in red)

Observation data Epoch J2000.0 Equinox ICRS
- Constellation: Crux
- Right ascension: 12^{h} 03^{m} 01.501^{s}
- Declination: −63° 18′ 46.543″
- Apparent magnitude (V): 4.30

Characteristics
- Spectral type: A3(m)A8-A8
- U−B color index: +0.03
- B−V color index: +0.28

Astrometry
Radial velocity (R_{v})	−2.4 km/s
Proper motion (μ)	RA: −152.903 mas/yr Dec.: +6.355 mas/yr
Parallax (π)	14.5878±0.1297 mas
Distance	224 ± 2 ly (68.6 ± 0.6 pc)
Absolute magnitude (M_{V})	+1.29

Orbit
Period (P)	24.4828 d
Eccentricity (e)	0.61
Periastron epoch (T)	2419453.3470 JD
Argument of periastron (ω) (secondary)	358.9°
Semi-amplitude (K_{1}) (primary)	46.1 km/s
Semi-amplitude (K_{2}) (secondary)	56.1 km/s

Details
Mass	1.57 M_{☉}
Luminosity	81 L_{☉}
Surface gravity (log g)	3.76 cgs
Temperature	7341±250 K
Age	1.1 Gyr

Other designations
- θ^{1} Cru, CPD−62°2543, HD 104671, HIP 58758, HR 4599, SAO 251705

Database references
SIMBAD	data

Theta^{1} Crucis is a spectroscopic binary star system in the southern constellation of Crux. Its name is a Bayer designation that is Latinized from θ^{1} Crucis and abbreviated Theta^{1} Cru or θ^{1} Cru. This system is visible to the naked eye as a point of light with an apparent visual magnitude of 4.30^{m}. The distance to this star, as determined using parallax measurements, is around 224 light-years (69 pc).

The pair orbit each other closely with a period of 24.5 days and an eccentricity of 0.61. The primary component is an Am star, which is a chemically peculiar A-type star that shows anomalous variations in absorption lines of certain elements. It has a stellar classification of A3(m)A8-A8. With a mass 157% times that of the Sun, it radiates 81 times the Sun's luminosity from its outer atmosphere at an effective temperature of 7341 K. Unusually for a fully radiative A-type star, X-ray emissions have been detected, which may instead be coming from the orbiting companion.
