= Zeta Cygni =

Star in the constellation Cygnus

- Location of ζ Cygni (circled)

Observation data Epoch J2000.0 Equinox ICRS
- Constellation: Cygnus
- Right ascension: 21^{h} 12^{m} 56.186^{s}
- Declination: +30° 13′ 36.835″
- Apparent magnitude (V): 3.26

Characteristics
- Evolutionary stage: Giant + white dwarf
- Spectral type: G8IIIa + DA4.2
- U−B color index: +0.77
- B−V color index: +0.98

Astrometry
Radial velocity (R_{v})	+15.85 ± 0.26 km/s
Proper motion (μ)	RA: −3.792 mas/yr Dec.: −45.429 mas/yr
Parallax (π)	21.8130±0.1375 mas
Distance	149.5 ± 0.9 ly (45.8 ± 0.3 pc)
Absolute magnitude (M_{V})	–0.01

Orbit
Period (P)	6,489 ± 31 days
Semi-major axis (a)	0.19″
Eccentricity (e)	0.22 ± 0.03
Periastron epoch (T)	40,712 ± 178 MJD
Argument of periastron (ω) (secondary)	41 ± 10°
Semi-amplitude (K_{1}) (primary)	3.31 ± 0.12 km/s

Details

ζ Cyg A
Mass	3.05 M_{☉}
Radius	15 R_{☉}
Luminosity	112 L_{☉}
Surface gravity (log g)	2.41 cgs
Temperature	4,910 K
Metallicity [Fe/H]	–0.04 dex
Rotational velocity (v sin i)	0.4 ± 0.5 km/s
Age	0.2 Gyr

ζ Cyg B
Mass	0.6 M_{☉}
Temperature	12,000 K

Other designations
- Tianjinnan, ζ Cyg, 64 Cyg, BD+29°4348, HD 202109, HIP 104732, HR 8115, SAO 71070

Database references
SIMBAD	data

Zeta Cygni is a binary star system in the northern constellation of Cygnus, the swan. It has the proper name Tianjinnan; Zeta Cygni is its Bayer designation, which is Latinized from ζ Cygni and abbreviated Zeta Cyg or ζ Cyg. The system has a combined apparent visual magnitude of 3.26 and, based upon parallax measurements, is about 143 light-years (44 parsecs) away.

== Observations ==
The primary component, ζ Cyg A is a giant star with a spectral type of G8 IIIp. Its most likely status is as a red clump giant, an evolved star that has begun core helium fusion. It has around three times the mass of the Sun and has expanded to about 15 times the Sun's radius. It is radiating 112 times the brightness of the Sun from its outer atmosphere at an effective temperature of 4,910 K. At this temperature, the star glows with the yellow hue of a G-type star.

The secondary component, ζ Cyg B, is a white dwarf of type DA4.2. The pair orbit each other every 6,489 days (17.8 years) with an eccentricity of 0.22. The white dwarf cannot be seen directly, but is estimated to have an apparent magnitude of 13.2.

Zeta Cygni A has an overabundance of barium, as well as other heavy chemical elements in its atmosphere, making it a so-called "mild" barium star. These elements were synthesized by the other member of the system as it passed through the asymptotic giant branch (AGB) stage of its evolution, then ejected in its stellar wind and accreted onto the current primary component. Prior to acquiring this additional mass, Zeta Cygni A had about 2.5 times the mass of the Sun, while the more evolved AGB star had three solar masses.

In Chinese astronomy, this is the southernmost star of the constellation Tianjin, the Celestial Ferry. This constellation figures in the story of the Cowherd and the Weaver Girl (Altair and Vega), allowing the lovers to cross the Milky Way and meet once a year. The IAU Working Group on Star Names adopted the name Tianjinnan ("nan" meaning south) for Zeta Cygni A on 16 July 2026.
