= Upsilon Cygni =

Star in the constellation Cygnus

- Location of υ Cygni (circled in red)

Observation data Epoch J2000.0 Equinox J2000.0 (ICRS)
- Constellation: Cygnus
- Right ascension: 21^{h} 17^{m} 55.08585^{s}
- Declination: +34° 53′ 48.7255″
- Apparent magnitude (V): 4.43

Characteristics
- Spectral type: B2 Vne
- U−B color index: −0.82
- B−V color index: −0.11

Astrometry
Radial velocity (R_{v})	−1.93±0.59 km/s
Proper motion (μ)	RA: +5.667 mas/yr Dec.: −5.601 mas/yr
Parallax (π)	5.0120±0.1891 mas
Distance	650 ± 20 ly (200 ± 8 pc)
Absolute magnitude (M_{V})	−2.03

Details
Mass	9.25±0.52 M_{☉}
Radius	4.7 R_{☉}
Luminosity (bolometric)	7,305 L_{☉}
Surface gravity (log g)	3.30±0.10 cgs
Temperature	22,000 K
Metallicity [Fe/H]	−0.36 dex
Rotational velocity (v sin i)	230±24 km/s
Age	17.0±2.8 Myr

Other designations
- υ Cyg, 66 Cygni, BD+34°4371, FK5 1559, HD 202904, HIP 105138, HR 8146, SAO 71173

Database references
SIMBAD	data

Upsilon Cygni is a star in the northern constellation of Cygnus. Its name is a Bayer designation that is Latinized from υ Cygni, and abbreviated Upsilon Cyg or υ Cyg. It is visible to the naked eye, having an apparent visual magnitude of 4.43. Based upon an annual parallax shift of 5.0 mas, it lies at a distance of roughly 650 light years from the Sun.

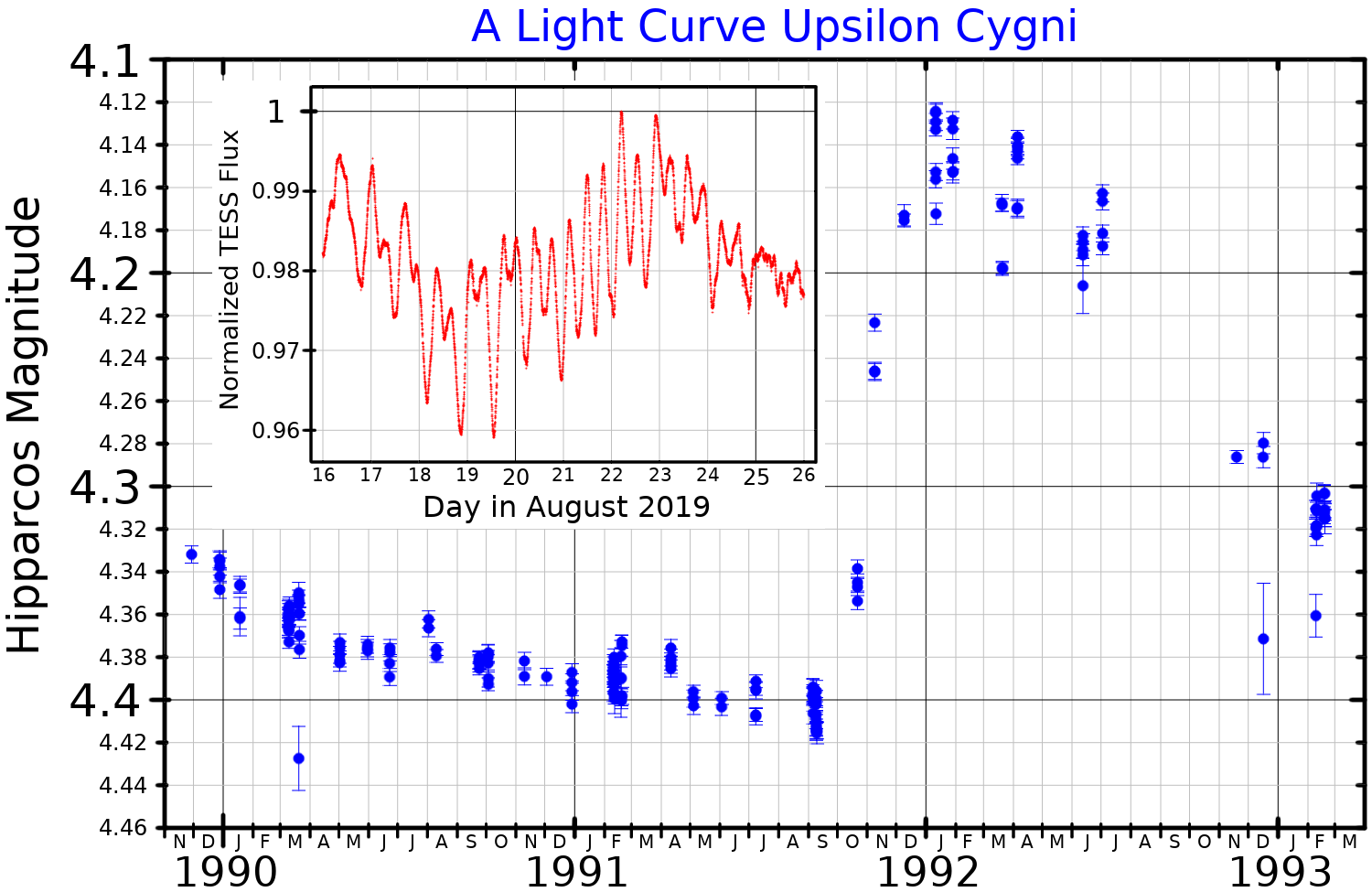
A light curve for Upsilon Cygni. The main figure, plotted from Hipparcos data, shows the long-term variability, and the inset figure, plotted from TESS data, shows the short-term variability.

This is a B-type main sequence star with a stellar classification of B2 Vne. The 'e' suffix indicates this is a Be star, which means it is a rapidly rotating star surrounded by an orbiting gaseous disk. It has a high projected rotational velocity of about 230 km/s, which accounts for the nebulous appearance of its lines as indicated by the 'n' suffix. The emission region of its disk has a radius of 0.20±0.04 AU. The star itself is being viewed generally "pole-on", as ascertained by the lack of absorption features from the disk.

Upsilon Cygni holds 9.3 times the mass of the Sun and is 4.7 times the Sun's radius. The rapid rotation is giving the star an oblate shape with an equatorial bulge that is 18% wider than the polar radius. It is radiating 7,305 times the solar luminosity from its outer atmosphere at an effective temperature of 22,000 K.

The star shows variations in luminosity, including short term non-radial pulsations with periods of 2.95 and 2.6 per day, as well as random outbursts occurring up to every few years. The latter may be associated with mass-loss episodes. There is suspicion this is a spectroscopic binary, but no companion has been detected via speckle interferometry. Measured variations in radial velocity may be caused by a companion having an orbital period of about 11.4 years. Several stars appear close to it in the sky, but they are likely optical companions.
