= Tau Cygni =

Variable star in the constellation Cygnus

- Location of τ Cygni (circled)

Observation data Epoch J2000.0 Equinox ICRS
- Constellation: Cygnus
- Right ascension: 21^{h} 14^{m} 47.4925^{s}
- Declination: +38° 02′ 43.144″
- Apparent magnitude (V): 3.65 to 3.75 (3.80 / 6.69)

Characteristics
- Spectral type: F2 IV + G0 V
- U−B color index: +0.03 / +0.09
- B−V color index: +0.38 / +0.60
- Variable type: δ Sct

Astrometry
Radial velocity (R_{v})	−20.9 km/s
Proper motion (μ)	RA: +196.99 mas/yr Dec.: +410.28 mas/yr
Parallax (π)	49.16±0.40 mas
Distance	66.3 ± 0.5 ly (20.3 ± 0.2 pc)
Absolute magnitude (M_{V})	2.21 / 5.00

Orbit
Period (P)	49.5240 years
Semi-major axis (a)	0.92224
Eccentricity (e)	0.24535
Inclination (i)	133.242°
Longitude of the node (Ω)	161.343°
Periastron epoch (T)	1938.5919
Argument of periastron (ω) (secondary)	116.416°

Details

τ Cyg A
Mass	1.65 M_{☉}
Radius	2.48 R_{☉}
Surface gravity (log g)	3.87 cgs
Temperature	6,600 K
Metallicity [Fe/H]	0.05 dex

τ Cyg B
Mass	1.03 M_{☉}
Radius	0.93 R_{☉}
Surface gravity (log g)	4.52 cgs
Temperature	5,670 K

Other designations
- Enduri Senggu, τ Cyg, 65 Cyg, BD+37°4240, GC 29723, GJ 822.1, GJ 9728, HD 202444, HIP 104887, HR 8130, SAO 71121, CCDM J21148+3803AB

Database references
SIMBAD	data
- A
- B

Tau Cygni is a binary star system in the constellation of Cygnus. It has the proper name Enduri Senggu (Manchu: ᡝᠨᡩᡠᡵᡳ ᠰᡝᠩᡤᡠ, Möllendorff: enduri senggu). Tau Cygni is its Bayer designation, which is Latinized from τ Cygni and abbreviated Tau Cyg or τ Cyg. Based on parallax measurements, it is located at a distance of approximately 66 light-years from Earth.

This visual binary system has an orbital period of 49.6 years with an eccentricity of 0.245. The primary component, 4th magnitude GJ 822.1 A, is a yellowish white subgiant star of the spectral type F2IV. It has a surface temperature of 6,000 to 7,500 kelvins and is larger, hotter, and several times as bright as the Sun. Its companion, 6th magnitude GJ 822.1 B, is a yellow main sequence star of the spectral type G0V. It is similar to the Sun in size, surface temperature, and luminosity.

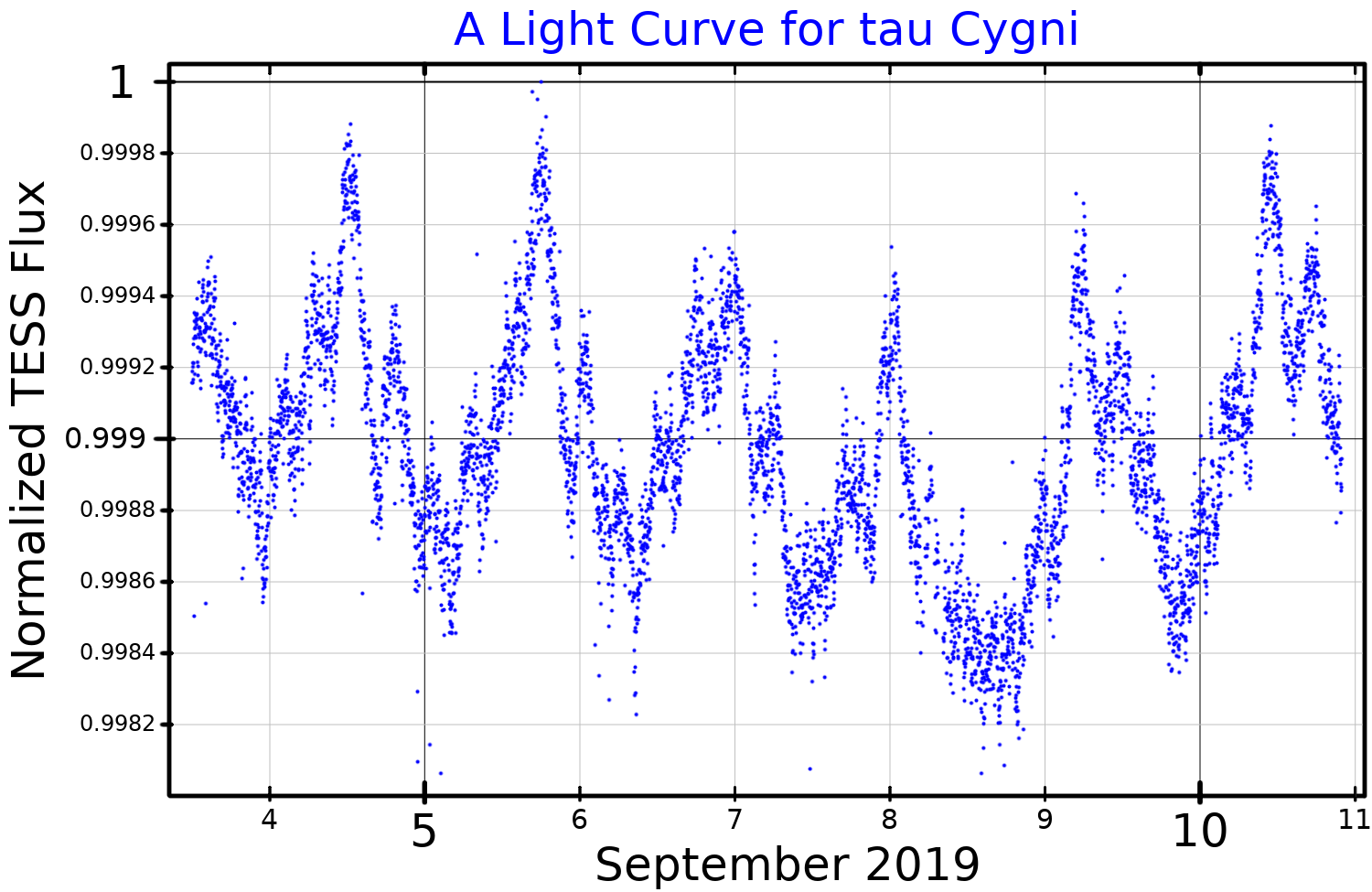
A light curve for Tau Cygni plotted from TESS data

Tau Cygni A is classified as a δ Scuti variable. The magnitude range is given as 3.65 to 3.75, which is the combined magnitude for both components, although the variable component is A.

This star is part of the Manchu constellation Enduri Senggu, representing a hedgehog goddess. The IAU Working Group on Star Names adopted the name Enduri Senggu for Tau Cygni A on 16 July 2026.
