= Iota Cephei =

Star in the constellation Cepheus

- Location of ι Cephei (circled in red)

Observation data Epoch J2000 Equinox ICRS
- Constellation: Cepheus
- Right ascension: 22^{h} 49^{m} 40.817^{s}
- Declination: +66° 12′ 01.46″
- Apparent magnitude (V): 3.507

Characteristics
- Evolutionary stage: red clump
- Spectral type: K0 III
- U−B color index: +0.924
- B−V color index: +1.053

Astrometry
Radial velocity (R_{v})	−12.763±0.0008 km/s
Proper motion (μ)	RA: −65.89 mas/yr Dec.: −125.17 mas/yr
Parallax (π)	28.29±0.10 mas
Distance	115.3 ± 0.4 ly (35.3 ± 0.1 pc)
Absolute magnitude (M_{V})	0.76

Details
Mass	2.15±0.23 M_{☉}
Radius	11.02±0.09 R_{☉}
Luminosity	57.0±0.6 L_{☉}
Surface gravity (log g)	2.69±0.06 cgs
Temperature	4,768±33 K
Metallicity [Fe/H]	+0.05±0.10 dex
Rotational velocity (v sin i)	10 km/s
Age	1.2±0.6 Gyr

Other designations
- ι Cep, 32 Cep, BD+65°1814, HD 216228, HIP 112724, HR 8694, SAO 20268

Database references
SIMBAD	data

Iota Cephei is a star in the northern constellation Cepheus. Its name is a Bayer designation that is Latinized from ι Cephei, and abbreviated Iota Cep or ι Cep. Based upon an annual parallax shift of 28.29 mas as seen from the Earth, it is located about 115 light-years (35 pc) from the Sun. The star is visible to the naked eye with an apparent visual magnitude of 3.5.

It is a K-type giant star with a stellar classification of K0 III. It is currently at an evolutionary stage known as the red clump, indicating that it is generating energy through the fusion of helium at its core. It has 11 times the Sun's radius and about 2.15 times the mass of the Sun. Its luminosity is 57 times that of the Sun, and its surface has an effective temperature of 4,768 K.

== Pole star ==
Iota Cephei is located within 5° of the precessional path traced across the celestial sphere by the Earth's North pole. In about 3,000 years, it will be one of the closest visible stars to the celestial north pole, along with Alfirk which will also be within 5° of the precessional path, on the other side.

Preceded by	Pole Star	Succeeded by
Errai	5200AD to 7500AD with Alfirk	Alderamin
