= Am star =

Type of chemically peculiar star

An Am star or metallic-line star is a type of chemically peculiar star of spectral type A whose spectrum has strong and often variable absorption lines of metals such as zinc, strontium, zirconium, and barium, and deficiencies of others, such as calcium and scandium. The original definition of an Am star was one in which the star shows "an apparent surface underabundance of Ca (and/or Sc) and/or an apparent overabundance of the Fe group and heavier elements".

The unusual relative abundances cause the spectral type assessed from the Calcium K lines to be systematically earlier than one assessed from other metallic lines. Typically, a spectral type judged solely from hydrogen lines is intermediate. This leads to two or three spectral types being given. For example, Sirius has been given a spectral type of kA0hA0VmA1, indicating that it is A0 when judged by the Calcium k line, A0V when judged by its hydrogen lines, and A1 when judged by the lines of heavy metals. There are other formats, such as A0mA1Va, again for Sirius.

The chemical abnormalities are due to some elements which absorb more light being pushed towards the surface, while others sink under the force of gravity. This effect takes place only if the star has low rotational velocity. Normally, A-type stars rotate quickly. Most Am stars form part of a binary system in which the rotation of the stars has been slowed by tidal braking.

The best-known metallic-line star is Sirius (α Canis Majoris). The following table lists some metallic-line stars in order of descending apparent visual magnitude.

== List ==
Name	Bayer or other designation	Apparent visual magnitude
Sirius A	α Canis Majoris A	−1.47
Castor Ba	α Geminorum Ba	2.96
	α Volantis	4.00
Acubens A	α Cancri A	4.26
Kurhah	ξ Cephei	4.29
	θ^{1} Crucis	4.30
	π Virginis	4.64
	μ Aurigae	4.88
	2 Ursae Majoris	5.46
	τ^{3} Gruis	5.72
	WW Aurigae	5.82
	IK Pegasi	6.08

== δ Delphini and ρ Puppis ==
A small number of Am stars show unusually late spectral types and particularly strong luminosity effects. Although Am stars in general show abnormal luminosity effects, stars such as ρ Puppis are believed to be more evolved and more luminous than most Am stars, lying above the main sequence. Am stars and δ Scuti variables lie in approximately the same location on the H–R diagram, but it is rare for a star to be both an Am star and a δ Scuti variable. ρ Puppis is one example and δ Delphini is another.

Several authors have referred to a class of stars known as δ Delphini stars, Am stars but with relatively little difference between the calcium and other metallic lines. They have also been compared to the δ Scuti stars. Later studies showed that the group was somewhat inhomogeneous, possibly coincidental, and recommended dropping use of the δ Delphini class in favour of a narrower class of ρ Puppis stars with relatively high luminosity and late spectral types. However, there is still sometimes confusion, for example with ρ Puppis stars being considered to all be δ Scuti variables.
