= Omicron Cephei =

Binary star in the constellation Cepheus

ο Cephei
- Location of ο Cephei (circled in red)

Observation data Epoch J2000.0 Equinox ICRS
- Constellation: Cepheus
- ο Cep A
- Right ascension: 23^{h} 18^{m} 37.493^{s}
- Declination: +68° 06′ 41.20″
- Apparent magnitude (V): 4.86
- ο Cep B
- Right ascension: 23^{h} 18^{m} 37.110^{s}
- Declination: +68° 06′ 38.64″
- Apparent magnitude (V): 7.13

Characteristics
- U−B color index: +0.49
- B−V color index: +0.84
- R−I color index: +0.45

ο Cep A
- Evolutionary stage: red clump
- Spectral type: G8III

ο Cep B
- Evolutionary stage: main sequence
- Spectral type: F6V

Astrometry

ο Cep A
Proper motion (μ)	RA: +54.277 mas/yr Dec.: +9.902 mas/yr
Parallax (π)	16.3251±0.0854 mas
Distance	200 ± 1 ly (61.3 ± 0.3 pc)
Absolute magnitude (M_{V})	0.78

ο Cep B
Proper motion (μ)	RA: +43.343 mas/yr Dec.: +13.343 mas/yr
Parallax (π)	16.3359±0.0485 mas
Distance	199.7 ± 0.6 ly (61.2 ± 0.2 pc)

Orbit
Period (P)	1,505±40 years
Semi-major axis (a)	3.13″±0.12″
Eccentricity (e)	0.439±0.020
Inclination (i)	16.0±4.0°
Longitude of the node (Ω)	4.5±4.5°
Periastron epoch (T)	B1,692±20
Argument of periastron (ω) (secondary)	93.0±20.0°

Details

ο Cep A
Mass	2.35±0.15 M_{☉}
Luminosity	51 L_{☉}
Metallicity [Fe/H]	0.05±0.02 dex

ο Cep B
Mass	1.29 M_{☉}

Other designations
- STF 3001AB, ο Cep, Omicron Cephei, Omicron Cep, 34 Cephei, BD+67°1514, GC 32463, HD 219916, HIP 115088, HR 8872, SAO 20554, PPM 24360, ADS 16666 AB, CCDM J23186+6807AB, WDS 23186+6807AB, GSC 04478-01361

Database references
SIMBAD	data
- A
- B

Omicron Cephei is a binary star system in the northern constellation of Cepheus. Its name is a Bayer designation that is Latinized from ο Cephei, and abbreviated Omicron Cep or ο Cep. The combined apparent visual magnitude of the system is 4.75, which is bright enough to be visible to the naked eye as a point of light. Based on parallax measurements, it is located at a distance of 200 light-years (61 pc) from Earth.

This system consists of a less massive F-type main sequence star in orbit with a more massive G-type giant star. The pair was first determined to be binary by F. G. W. Struve in 1832. Since then, the secondary has been seen to revolve approximately 45 degrees around the primary. A number of orbits have been computed, with a 2003 study giving a period of approximately 1500 years.

There is a visual companion, CCDM J23186+6807C, to the binary star. It has an approximate apparent visual magnitude of 12.8 and is located approximately 45 arcseconds away from it.
