= Roof (Chinese constellation) =

Mansion in Chinese astronomy

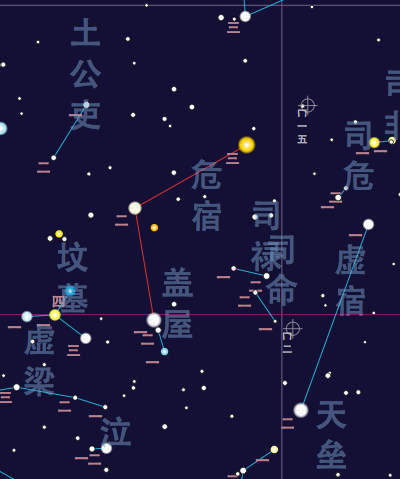
A star map of the Roof

The Roof mansion (Chinese: 危宿; pinyin: Wēi Xiù) is one of the twenty-eight mansions of the Chinese constellations. It is one of the northern mansions of the Black Tortoise.

== Asterisms ==
English name	Chinese name	European constellation	Number of stars	Representing
Roof	危	Aquarius/Pegasus	3	Top stores
Tomb	墳墓	Aquarius	4	Tomb hills
Humans	人	Pegasus	4	People
Pestle	杵	Pegasus/Lacerta	3	Pestle military provisions
Mortar	臼	Pegasus/Cygnus	4	Army food mill
Big Yard for Chariots	車府	Cygnus/Lacerta	7	The garage
Celestial Hook	天鈎	Cepheus/Draco	9	Similar hook shape
Zaofu	造父	Cepheus	5	Zaofu was a famous chariot driver
Roofing	蓋屋	Aquarius	2	Palace officials on behalf of management of the roof
Temple	虛梁	Aquarius	4	Empty garden tomb
Celestial Money	天錢	Piscis Austrinus	5	Money in the heaven
