= List of stars in Scorpius =

This is the list of notable stars in the constellation Scorpius, sorted by decreasing brightness.

| Name | B | F | Var | HD | HIP | RA | Dec | vis. mag. | abs. mag. | Dist. (ly) | Sp. class | Notes |
|---|---|---|---|---|---|---|---|---|---|---|---|---|
| Antares A | α | 21 | | 148478 | 80763 | 16^{h} 29^{m} 24.47^{s} | −26° 25′ 55.0″ | 0.91 | −5.24 | 553 | M1.5Iab-b | Cor Scorpii, Qalb al-Aqrab, Vespertilo; 16th brightest star; binary; semiregular variable, V_{max} = 0.75^{m}, V_{min} = 1.21^{m}, P = 2180 d |
| λ Sco | λ | 35 | | 158926 | 85927 | 17^{h} 33^{m} 36.53^{s} | −37° 06′ 13.5″ | 1.62 | −5.05 | 703 | B2IV+DA7.9 | Shaula; β Cep and Algol variable, V_{max} = 1.59^{m}, V_{min} = 1.65^{m}, P = 0.21 d |
| θ Sco | θ | | | 159532 | 86228 | 17^{h} 37^{m} 19.13^{s} | −42° 59′ 52.2″ | 1.86 | −2.75 | 272 | F1II | Sargas; suspected variable, V_{max} = 1.84^{m}, V_{min} = 1.88^{m} |
| δ Sco | δ | 7 | | 143275 | 78401 | 16^{h} 00^{m} 20.01^{s} | −22° 37′ 17.8″ | 2.29 | −3.16 | 401 | B0.2IVe | Dschubba, Al Jabba, Iclarkrau; γ Cas variable, V_{max} = 1.59^{m}, V_{min} = 2.32^{m} |
| ε Sco | ε | 26 | | 151680 | 82396 | 16^{h} 50^{m} 10.24^{s} | −34° 17′ 33.4″ | 2.29 | 0.78 | 65 | K2IIIb | Wei, Larawag; suspected variable, V_{max} = 2.24^{m}, V_{min} = 2.35^{m} |
| κ Sco | κ | | | 160578 | 86670 | 17^{h} 42^{m} 29.28^{s} | −39° 01′ 47.7″ | 2.39 | −3.38 | 464 | B1.5III | Girtab; β Cep variable, V_{max} = 2.41^{m}, V_{min} = 2.42^{m}, P = 0.20 d |
| β^{1} Sco | β^{1} | 8 | | 144217 | 78820 | 16^{h} 05^{m} 26.23^{s} | −19° 48′ 19.4″ | 2.62 | −3.44 | 530 | B0.5V | Acrab, Elacrab, Graffias, Grafias, Grassias; suspected variable, V_{max} = 2.61^{m}, V_{min} = 2.67^{m} |
| υ Sco | υ | 34 | | 158408 | 85696 | 17^{h} 30^{m} 45.84^{s} | −37° 17′ 44.7″ | 2.70 | −3.31 | 518 | B2IV | Lesath, Lesuth |
| τ Sco | τ | 23 | | 149438 | 81266 | 16^{h} 35^{m} 52.96^{s} | −28° 12′ 57.5″ | 2.82 | −2.78 | 430 | B0V | Paikauhale, Alniyat, Al Niyat |
| π Sco | π | 6 | | 143018 | 78265 | 15^{h} 58^{m} 51.12^{s} | −26° 06′ 50.6″ | 2.89 | −2.85 | 459 | B1V + B2V | Fang; Nur; rotating ellipsoidal variable, V_{max} = 2.88^{m}, V_{min} = 2.91^{m}, P = 1.57 d |
| σ Sco | σ | 20 | | 147165 | 80112 | 16^{h} 21^{m} 11.32^{s} | −25° 35′ 33.9″ | 2.90 | −3.86 | 734 | B1III | Alniyat, Al Niyat, β Cep variable, V_{max} = 2.86^{m}, V_{min} = 2.94^{m}, P = 0.25 d |
| ι^{1} Sco | ι^{1} | | | 161471 | 87073 | 17^{h} 47^{m} 35.08^{s} | −40° 07′ 37.1″ | 2.99 | −5.71 | 1791 | F3Ia | |
| μ^{1} Sco | μ^{1} | | | 151890 | 82514 | 16^{h} 51^{m} 52.24^{s} | −38° 02′ 50.4″ | 3.00 | −4.01 | 821 | B1.5IV + B | Xamidimura; β Lyr variable, V_{max} = 2.94^{m}, V_{min} = 3.22^{m}, P = 1.45 d |
| G Sco | G | | | 161892 | 87261 | 17^{h} 49^{m} 51.45^{s} | −37° 02′ 36.1″ | 3.19 | 0.24 | 127 | K0/K1III | γ Tel, Fuyue |
| η Sco | η | | | 155203 | 84143 | 17^{h} 12^{m} 09.18^{s} | −43° 14′ 18.6″ | 3.32 | 1.61 | 72 | F3p | suspected variable |
| μ^{2} Sco | μ^{2} | | | 151985 | 82545 | 16^{h} 52^{m} 20.15^{s} | −38° 01′ 02.9″ | 3.56 | −2.44 | 517 | B2IV | Pipirima, Shéngōng (神宮), |
| ζ^{2} Sco | ζ^{2} | | | 152334 | 82729 | 16^{h} 54^{m} 35.11^{s} | −42° 21′ 38.7″ | 3.62 | 0.30 | 150 | K4III | suspected variable, V_{max} = 3.59^{m}, V_{min} = 3.65^{m} |
| ρ Sco | ρ | 5 | | 142669 | 78104 | 15^{h} 56^{m} 53.09^{s} | −29° 12′ 50.4″ | 3.87 | −1.62 | 409 | B2IV/V | Iklil, suspected variable |
| ω^{1} Sco | ω^{1} | 9 | | 144470 | 78933 | 16^{h} 06^{m} 48.43^{s} | −20° 40′ 08.9″ | 3.93 | −1.64 | 423 | B1V | Jabhat al Akrab |
| ν Sco | ν | 14 | | 145502 | 79374 | 16^{h} 11^{m} 59.74^{s} | −19° 27′ 38.3″ | 4.00 | −1.63 | 436 | B2IV | Jabbah, Jabah; quintuple star |
| H Sco | H | | | 149447 | 81304 | 16^{h} 36^{m} 22.46^{s} | −35° 15′ 19.3″ | 4.18 | −0.90 | 339 | K5III | β Nor; suspected variable, V_{max} = 4.15^{m}, V_{min} = 4.18^{m} |
| N Sco | N | | | 148703 | 80911 | 16^{h} 31^{m} 22.94^{s} | −34° 42′ 15.6″ | 4.24 | −2.56 | 746 | B2III-IV | α Nor |
| Q Sco | Q | | | 159433 | 86170 | 17^{h} 36^{m} 32.85^{s} | −38° 38′ 05.5″ | 4.26 | 1.03 | 144 | G8/K0III/IV | suspected variable, V_{max} = 4.26^{m}, V_{min} = 4.29^{m} |
| ω^{2} Sco | ω^{2} | 10 | | 144608 | 78990 | 16^{h} 07^{m} 24.30^{s} | −20° 52′ 07.2″ | 4.31 | −0.24 | 265 | G6/G8III | Jabhat al Akrab; on 18 November 2038, it will be occulted by Venus over a small part of Southeast Africa, S Indian Ocean |
| ο Sco | ο | 19 | | 147084 | 80079 | 16^{h} 20^{m} 38.18^{s} | −24° 10′ 09.4″ | 4.55 | −3.24 | 1177 | A4II/III | suspected variable, V_{max} = 4.52^{m}, V_{min} = 4.58^{m} |
| 13 Sco | c^{2} | 13 | | 145482 | 79404 | 16^{h} 12^{m} 18.21^{s} | −27° 55′ 34.7″ | 4.58 | −1.20 | 468 | B2V | |
| 2 Sco | A | 2 | | 142114 | 77840 | 15^{h} 53^{m} 36.73^{s} | −25° 19′ 37.5″ | 4.59 | −1.03 | 434 | B2.5Vn | |
| 1 Sco | b | 1 | | 141637 | 77635 | 15^{h} 50^{m} 58.75^{s} | −25° 45′ 04.4″ | 4.63 | −1.39 | 522 | B1.5Vn | |
| ζ^{1} Sco | ζ^{1} | | | 152236 | 82671 | 16^{h} 53^{m} 59.73^{s} | −42° 21′ 43.3″ | 4.70 | −8.5 | 2600 | B1Iae | in NGC 6231; luminous blue variable, V_{max} = 4.66^{m}, V_{min} = 4.86^{m} |
| ξ Sco A | ξ | (51) | | 144070 | | 16^{h} 04^{m} 22.10^{s} | −11° 22′ 23.0″ | 4.77 | | 92 | | 51 Lib; sextuple star |
| ι^{2} Sco | ι^{2} | | | 161912 | 87294 | 17^{h} 50^{m} 11.11^{s} | −40° 05′ 25.5″ | 4.78 | −5.50 | 3705 | A6Ib | suspected variable |
| 22 Sco | i | 22 | | 148605 | 80815 | 16^{h} 30^{m} 12.48^{s} | −25° 06′ 54.6″ | 4.79 | −0.61 | 393 | B3V | suspected variable |
| HD 161840 | (ξ) | | | 161840 | 87220 | 17^{h} 49^{m} 10.47^{s} | −31° 42′ 11.5″ | 4.79 | −1.56 | 607 | B8Ib/II | Xi Telescopii |
| HD 146624 | d | | | 146624 | 79881 | 16^{h} 18^{m} 17.92^{s} | −28° 36′ 49.6″ | 4.80 | 1.63 | 140 | A0V: | |
| V1073 Sco | k | | V1073 | 154090 | 83574 | 17^{h} 04^{m} 49.35^{s} | −34° 07′ 22.5″ | 4.83 | −4.74 | 2672 | B2Iab | α Cyg variable |
| HD 163145 | | | | 163145 | 87846 | 17^{h} 56^{m} 47.43^{s} | −44° 20′ 31.9″ | 4.85 | −0.29 | 347 | K2III | |
| HD 163376 | y | | | 163376 | 87936 | 17^{h} 57^{m} 47.81^{s} | −41° 42′ 58.5″ | 4.88 | −1.24 | 547 | M0III | suspected variable |
| β^{2} Sco | β^{2} | | | 144218 | 78821 | 16^{h} 05^{m} 26.58^{s} | −19° 48′ 06.6″ | 4.90 | −2.80 | 530 | B2V | component of the β Sco system |
| ψ Sco | ψ | 15 | | 145570 | 79375 | 16^{h} 12^{m} 00.00^{s} | −10° 03′ 51.1″ | 4.93 | 1.41 | 165 | A3IV | |
| HD 143787 | | | | 143787 | 78650 | 16^{h} 03^{m} 20.67^{s} | −25° 51′ 54.5″ | 4.96 | 0.90 | 212 | K3III | |
| HD 153613 | | | | 153613 | 83336 | 17^{h} 01^{m} 52.65^{s} | −32° 08′ 36.2″ | 5.03 | −0.86 | 491 | B8V | |
| HD 154948 | | | | 154948 | 84033 | 17^{h} 10^{m} 42.35^{s} | −44° 33′ 27.2″ | 5.06 | 0.24 | 300 | G8/K0III+.. | |
| ξ Sco B | ξ | | | 144069 | 78727 | 16^{h} 04^{m} 22.3^{s} | −11° 22′ 18″ | 5.07 | | 92 | F5IV | component of the ξ Sco system |
| HD 145250 | | | | 145250 | 79302 | 16^{h} 11^{m} 02.13^{s} | −29° 24′ 57.6″ | 5.09 | 0.62 | 255 | K0III | |
| HD 157243 | | | | 157243 | 85162 | 17^{h} 24^{m} 13.09^{s} | −44° 09′ 45.0″ | 5.10 | −1.73 | 756 | B7III | |
| Antares B | α | 21 | | 148479 | | 16^{h} 29^{m} 24.2^{s} | −26° 25′ 51″ | 5.2 | −0.9 | 553 | B2.5V | component of the Antares system |
| HD 151804 | | | V973 | 151804 | 82493 | 16^{h} 51^{m} 33.72^{s} | −41° 13′ 49.9″ | 5.23 | −6.36 | 6792 | O8Iaf | α Cyg variable, V_{max} = 5.22^{m}, V_{min} = 5.28^{m} |
| χ Sco | χ | 17 | | 145897 | 79540 | 16^{h} 13^{m} 50.91^{s} | −11° 50′ 15.8″ | 5.24 | −0.41 | 439 | K3III | Has a planet (b) |
| HD 148688 | | | V1058 | 148688 | 80945 | 16^{h} 31^{m} 41.77^{s} | −41° 49′ 01.7″ | 5.31 | −6.79 | 8579 | B1Ia | α Cyg variable |
| HD 144690 | | | | 144690 | 79050 | 16^{h} 08^{m} 07.52^{s} | −26° 19′ 36.0″ | 5.35 | −0.23 | 425 | M2III | variable star, ΔV = 0.008^{m}, P = 7.61 d |
| HD 147513 | | | | 147513 | 80337 | 16^{h} 24^{m} 01.24^{s} | −39° 11′ 34.8″ | 5.37 | 4.82 | 42 | G3/G5V | has a planet (b) |
| HD 142165 | | | | 142165 | 77858 | 15^{h} 53^{m} 53.92^{s} | −24° 31′ 59.1″ | 5.38 | −0.14 | 414 | B5V | |
| HR 5907 | | | V1040 | 142184 | 77859 | 15^{h} 53^{m} 55.87^{s} | −23° 58′ 40.9″ | 5.41 | 0.01 | 393 | B2V | Algol variable, V_{max} = 5.39^{m}, V_{min} = 5.43^{m}, P = 1.02 d |
| HD 147628 | | | | 147628 | 80390 | 16^{h} 24^{m} 31.77^{s} | −37° 33′ 57.5″ | 5.42 | −0.36 | 468 | B8V | suspected rotating ellipsoidal variable, ΔV = 0.02^{m} |
| HD 142990 | | | V913 | 142990 | 78246 | 15^{h} 58^{m} 34.87^{s} | −24° 49′ 53.1″ | 5.43 | −0.45 | 488 | B5V | SX Ari variable, V_{max} = 5.4^{m}, V_{min} = 5.47^{m}, P = 0.98 d |
| 16 Sco | n | 16 | | 145607 | 79387 | 16^{h} 12^{m} 07.29^{s} | −08° 32′ 51.3″ | 5.43 | 1.01 | 250 | A4V | |
| HD 149404 | | | V918 | 149404 | 81305 | 16^{h} 36^{m} 22.57^{s} | −42° 51′ 31.9″ | 5.46 | −4.39 | 3047 | O9Ia | rotating ellipsoidal variable, V_{max} = 5.42^{m}, V_{min} = 5.5^{m}, P = 9.81 d |
| HD 152234 | | | | 152234 | 82676 | 16^{h} 54^{m} 01.84^{s} | −41° 48′ 23.0″ | 5.46 | −5.84 | 5927 | B0.5Ia | in NGC 6231; suspected variable |
| HD 151078 | | | | 151078 | 82135 | 16^{h} 46^{m} 47.97^{s} | −39° 22′ 36.8″ | 5.48 | 0.21 | 369 | K0III | |
| 27 Sco | | 27 | | 152820 | 82960 | 16^{h} 57^{m} 11.17^{s} | −33° 15′ 34.1″ | 5.48 | −1.25 | 724 | K5III | |
| 18 Sco | | 18 | | 146233 | 79672 | 16^{h} 15^{m} 37.13^{s} | −08° 22′ 05.7″ | 5.49 | 4.76 | 46 | G1V | solar twin; suspected variable, V_{max} = 5.48^{m}, V_{min} = 5.59^{m} |
| HD 144987 | r^{2} | | | 144987 | 79199 | 16^{h} 09^{m} 52.61^{s} | −33° 32′ 44.5″ | 5.50 | −0.12 | 433 | B8V | |
| HD 146836 | p | | | 146836 | 79980 | 16^{h} 19^{m} 32.68^{s} | −30° 54′ 24.4″ | 5.53 | 2.44 | 135 | F5IV | |
| HD 156098 | | | | 156098 | 84551 | 17^{h} 17^{m} 03.71^{s} | −32° 39′ 45.7″ | 5.53 | 2.01 | 165 | F6V | |
| HD 160668 | | | | 160668 | 86698 | 17^{h} 42^{m} 51.09^{s} | −36° 56′ 43.8″ | 5.53 | −0.57 | 542 | K5III | |
| HD 155806 | | | V1075 | 155806 | 84401 | 17^{h} 15^{m} 19.25^{s} | −33° 32′ 54.3″ | 5.53 | −5.13 | 4466 | O8Ve | Be star |
| HD 162587 | | | | 162587 | 87569 | 17^{h} 53^{m} 23.47^{s} | −34° 53′ 42.4″ | 5.58 | −1.97 | 1055 | K3III | in Messier 7 |
| 4 Sco | | 4 | | 142445 | 77984 | 15^{h} 55^{m} 30.10^{s} | −26° 15′ 57.3″ | 5.63 | 0.02 | 432 | A3V | |
| HD 150742 | | | | 150742 | 81972 | 16^{h} 44^{m} 42.60^{s} | −40° 50′ 22.6″ | 5.64 | −0.26 | 492 | B3V | |
| HD 155259 | | | | 155259 | 84150 | 17^{h} 12^{m} 16.22^{s} | −39° 30′ 24.4″ | 5.66 | 1.61 | 211 | A0/A1V | |
| 12 Sco | c^{1} | 12 | | 145483 | 79399 | 16^{h} 12^{m} 16.05^{s} | −28° 25′ 01.9″ | 5.67 | 0.87 | 298 | B9V | |
| HD 159176 | | | V1036 | 159176 | 86011 | 17^{h} 34^{m} 42.49^{s} | −32° 34′ 54.0″ | 5.69 | −4.40 | 3396 | O6V+... | in NGC 6383; trinary star; rotating ellipsoidal variable, V_{max} = 5.67^{m}, V_{min} = 5.73^{m}, P = 3.37 d |
| 11 Sco | | 11 | | 144708 | 79005 | 16^{h} 07^{m} 36.44^{s} | −12° 44′ 43.2″ | 5.75 | 0.17 | 426 | B9V | |
| HD 156293 | | | | 156293 | 84690 | 17^{h} 18^{m} 47.84^{s} | −44° 07′ 46.9″ | 5.76 | 0.68 | 339 | B9V | suspected variable |
| HD 152408 | | | | 152408 | 82775 | 16^{h} 54^{m} 58.51^{s} | −41° 09′ 03.1″ | 5.78 | −6.56 | 9588 | WN9ha | in NGC 6231; suspected variable, V_{max} = 5.77^{m}, V_{min} = 5.82^{m} |
| HD 148247 | | | | 148247 | 80672 | 16^{h} 28^{m} 14.46^{s} | −37° 10′ 47.3″ | 5.79 | 0.84 | 319 | K1IIICN... | |
| HD 147723 | | | | 147723 | 80399 | 16^{h} 24^{m} 39.77^{s} | −29° 42′ 16.8″ | 5.82 | 2.91 | 107 | F9IV | Double star with HD 147722 |
| V1003 Sco | | | V1003 | 149711 | 81472 | 16^{h} 38^{m} 26.30^{s} | −43° 23′ 54.2″ | 5.83 | −0.79 | 686 | B2.5IV | rotating ellipsoidal variable, ΔV = 0.03^{m} |
| HD 142883 | h | | | 142883 | 78168 | 15^{h} 57^{m} 40.47^{s} | −20° 58′ 58.9″ | 5.84 | 0.11 | 455 | B3V | Algol variable, V_{max} = 5.84^{m}, V_{min} = 6.31^{m}, P = 9.20 d |
| HD 150331 | | | | 150331 | 81741 | 16^{h} 41^{m} 45.50^{s} | −33° 08′ 44.2″ | 5.84 | 1.08 | 292 | G1II | |
| HD 152293 | | | | 152293 | 82716 | 16^{h} 54^{m} 26.94^{s} | −42° 28′ 44.0″ | 5.84 | | | F5Ib-II | |
| HD 158799 | | | | 158799 | 85889 | 17^{h} 33^{m} 07.39^{s} | −41° 10′ 23.0″ | 5.84 | −1.55 | 982 | B9Ib/II | |
| HD 162391 | | | | 162391 | 87472 | 17^{h} 52^{m} 19.76^{s} | −34° 25′ 00.6″ | 5.84 | −0.95 | 744 | G8/K0III | In Messier 7 |
| HD 145191 | | | | 145191 | 79320 | 16^{h} 11^{m} 17.77^{s} | −41° 07′ 10.2″ | 5.86 | 1.66 | 226 | F0IV | |
| HD 144844 | | | | 144844 | 79098 | 16^{h} 08^{m} 43.73^{s} | −23° 41′ 07.3″ | 5.87 | 0.28 | 426 | B9V | α^{2} CVn variable, V_{max} = 5.87^{m}, V_{min} = 5.90^{m}, P = 2.69 d |
| 3 Sco | | 3 | V927 | 142301 | 77909 | 15^{h} 54^{m} 39.54^{s} | −25° 14′ 37.2″ | 5.87 | 0.14 | 455 | B8III/IV | SX Ari variable, ΔV = 0.03^{m}, P = 1.46 d |
| HD 160928 | | | | 160928 | 86847 | 17^{h} 44^{m} 42.01^{s} | −42° 43′ 45.5″ | 5.87 | 1.29 | 269 | A2/A3IV/V | |
| V957 Sco | | | V957 | 162374 | 87460 | 17^{h} 52^{m} 13.66^{s} | −34° 47′ 57.1″ | 5.87 | −1.16 | 830 | B6Ib | In Messier 7; SX Ari variable, ΔV = 0.05^{m} |
| V929 Sco | | | V929 | 144334 | 78877 | 16^{h} 06^{m} 06.38^{s} | −23° 36′ 22.5″ | 5.90 | 0.03 | 487 | B8V | SX Ari variable, V_{max} = 5.89^{m}, V_{min} = 5.91^{m}, P = 1.50 d |
| HD 145838 | | | | 145838 | 79596 | 16^{h} 14^{m} 22.37^{s} | −33° 00′ 39.8″ | 5.91 | −0.56 | 643 | K0III | |
| V923 Sco | | | V923 | 153890 | 83491 | 17^{h} 03^{m} 50.87^{s} | −38° 09′ 09.0″ | 5.91 | 1.88 | 209 | F3V | Algol variable, V_{max} = 5.86^{m}, V_{min} = 6.24^{m}, P = 34.83 d |
| Gliese 667 A | | | | 156384A | 84709 | 17^{h} 18^{m} 56.36^{s} | −34° 59′ 22.5″ | 5.91 | 6.69 | 23 | K4V | component of the Gliese 667 system; suspected variable, V_{max} = 5.88^{m}, V_{min} = 5.92^{m} |
| HD 157097 | | | | 157097 | 85048 | 17^{h} 22^{m} 54.73^{s} | −37° 13′ 14.5″ | 5.91 | 0.36 | 421 | K1III | |
| HD 149886 | | | | 149886 | 81523 | 16^{h} 39^{m} 05.24^{s} | −37° 13′ 02.1″ | 5.93 | 0.31 | 434 | B9.5V+... | |
| HD 154783 | | | | 154783 | 83896 | 17^{h} 08^{m} 47.55^{s} | −30° 24′ 12.8″ | 5.93 | 1.36 | 267 | Fm | |
| HD 162189 | | | | 162189 | 87390 | 17^{h} 51^{m} 32.57^{s} | −40° 46′ 20.4″ | 5.94 | −0.83 | 738 | M2III | semiregular variable |
| V1068 Sco | | | V1068 | 152161 | 82650 | 16^{h} 53^{m} 42.44^{s} | −43° 03′ 03.2″ | 5.95 | −1.81 | 1160 | M3II/III | slow irregular variable |
| HD 153368 | | | | 153368 | 83235 | 17^{h} 00^{m} 36.99^{s} | −35° 56′ 02.3″ | 5.95 | 1.19 | 292 | K2IIICN... | |
| HD 155450 | | | | 155450 | 84226 | 17^{h} 12^{m} 58.56^{s} | −32° 26′ 18.0″ | 5.95 | −4.35 | 3747 | B1Ib | |
| HD 155826 | | | | 155826 | 84425 | 17^{h} 15^{m} 36.08^{s} | −38° 35′ 34.6″ | 5.95 | 3.52 | 100 | G0V | |
| HD 146850 | l^{2} | | | 146850 | 79938 | 16^{h} 19^{m} 00.43^{s} | −14° 52′ 22.2″ | 5.97 | −1.15 | 865 | K3IIICNpvar | |
| HD 154310 | | | | 154310 | 83693 | 17^{h} 06^{m} 20.20^{s} | −37° 13′ 39.1″ | 5.98 | 0.42 | 422 | A2IV | |
| HD 158105 | | | | 158105 | 85543 | 17^{h} 28^{m} 56.09^{s} | −36° 46′ 41.8″ | 5.98 | −0.47 | 637 | K0III | |
| HD 150894 | | | | 150894 | 81992 | 16^{h} 45^{m} 00.21^{s} | −28° 30′ 34.8″ | 5.99 | −0.83 | 755 | A3IV | |
| V906 Sco | | | V906 | 162724 | 87616 | 17^{h} 53^{m} 54.77^{s} | −34° 45′ 09.8″ | 6.00 | −1.45 | 1009 | B9V + B9V | In Messier 7, Algol variable, V_{max} = 5.96^{m}, V_{min} = 6.23^{m}, P = 2.79 d |
| BM Sco | | | BM | 160371 | 86527 | 17^{h} 40^{m} 58.55^{s} | −32° 12′ 52.0″ | 6.01 | −2.35 | 1531 | K3III + (G) | in Messier 6; slow irregular variable, V_{max} = 5.25^{m}, V_{min} = 6.46^{m} |
| HD 162517 | | | | 162517 | 87532 | 17^{h} 52^{m} 57.60^{s} | −35° 37′ 27.1″ | 6.03 | 1.99 | 209 | F2V | |
| HD 150608 | | | | 150608 | 81904 | 16^{h} 43^{m} 47.60^{s} | −38° 09′ 22.5″ | 6.05 | −0.62 | 703 | B9II/III | |
| HD 153072 | | | | 153072 | 83100 | 16^{h} 58^{m} 52.25^{s} | −37° 37′ 13.5″ | 6.05 | 1.47 | 269 | A3III | Shengong, suspected variable |
| HD 162496 | | | | 162496 | 87516 | 17^{h} 52^{m} 49.22^{s} | −34° 06′ 53.4″ | 6.05 | −0.60 | 697 | K1III | |
| HD 162926 | | | | 162926 | 87722 | 17^{h} 55^{m} 08.03^{s} | −36° 28′ 32.3″ | 6.05 | −0.75 | 748 | B9.5III | |
| HD 146001 | | | | 146001 | 79622 | 16^{h} 14^{m} 53.44^{s} | −25° 28′ 36.9″ | 6.06 | 0.30 | 462 | B8V | α^{2} CVn variable |
| HD 152248 | | | V1007 | 152248 | 82691 | 16^{h} 54^{m} 10.06^{s} | −41° 49′ 30.1″ | 6.06 | | | O7e | in NGC 6231; β Lyr variable, ΔV = 0.24^{m}, P = 5.82 d |
| HD 143619 | | | | 143619 | 78575 | 16^{h} 02^{m} 39.40^{s} | −29° 08′ 08.8″ | 6.07 | 0.37 | 451 | K2/K3III | |
| HD 148760 | | | | 148760 | 80910 | 16^{h} 31^{m} 22.87^{s} | −26° 32′ 15.2″ | 6.07 | 1.87 | 225 | K1III | |
| HD 146254 | l^{1} | | | 146254 | 79692 | 16^{h} 15^{m} 51.49^{s} | −14° 50′ 56.8″ | 6.09 | −0.28 | 614 | A0III | suspected variable, V_{max} = 6.06^{m}, V_{min} = 6.10^{m} |
| HD 155974 | | | | 155974 | 84489 | 17^{h} 16^{m} 21.68^{s} | −35° 44′ 58.1″ | 6.09 | 3.55 | 105 | F6V | |
| HD 159707 | | | | 159707 | 86311 | 17^{h} 38^{m} 08.45^{s} | −42° 52′ 48.7″ | 6.09 | −0.54 | 692 | B8V | |
| HD 151771 | | | | 151771 | 82453 | 16^{h} 51^{m} 00.04^{s} | −37° 30′ 52.1″ | 6.10 | −0.99 | 853 | B8II/III | suspected variable |
| HD 162817 | | | | 162817 | 87671 | 17^{h} 54^{m} 27.12^{s} | −34° 28′ 00.2″ | 6.10 | −0.96 | 842 | B9.5/A0III | |
| RR Sco | | | RR | 152783 | 82912 | 16^{h} 56^{m} 37.85^{s} | −30° 34′ 48.1″ | 6.10 | | 1150 | M6IIIe | Mira variable, V_{max} = 5^{m}, V_{min} = 12.4^{m}, P = 281.45 d |
| HD 146954 | | | | 146954 | 80066 | 16^{h} 20^{m} 32.63^{s} | −39° 25′ 48.8″ | 6.11 | 0.20 | 496 | B9V | |
| HD 154368 | | | V1074 | 154368 | 83706 | 17^{h} 06^{m} 28.37^{s} | −35° 27′ 03.7″ | 6.13 | −2.85 | 2040 | O9.5Iab | α Cyg variable |
| HD 150591 | | | | 150591 | 81914 | 16^{h} 43^{m} 54.09^{s} | −41° 06′ 47.9″ | 6.14 | 0.28 | 485 | B6/B7V | suspected variable |
| HD 157486 | | | | 157486 | 85237 | 17^{h} 25^{m} 02.67^{s} | −34° 41′ 45.6″ | 6.14 | 0.19 | 505 | Ap... | |
| HD 162586 | | | | 162586 | 87567 | 17^{h} 53^{m} 19.58^{s} | −34° 43′ 50.9″ | 6.14 | −0.88 | 825 | B4III | in Messier 7 |
| HD 142250 | | | | 142250 | 77900 | 15^{h} 54^{m} 30.12^{s} | −27° 20′ 18.9″ | 6.15 | 0.09 | 531 | B7V | has a planet (b) |
| HR 6522 | | | V949 | 158741 | 85839 | 17^{h} 32^{m} 24.64^{s} | −34° 16′ 45.6″ | 6.16 | 1.06 | 341 | F2IV | δ Sct variable, V_{max} = 6.13^{m}, V_{min} = 6.18^{m}, P = 0.22 d |
| HD 144927 | r^{1} | | | 144927 | 79173 | 16^{h} 09^{m} 31.76^{s} | −32° 38′ 56.2″ | 6.18 | 1.07 | 344 | K1III | |
| V861 Sco | | | V861 | 152667 | 82911 | 16^{h} 56^{m} 35.98^{s} | −40° 49′ 24.4″ | 6.18 | | | B0Ia | in Trumpler 24; β Lyr variable, V_{max} = 6.07^{m}, V_{min} = 6.4^{m}, P = 7.85 d |
| HD 154153 | | | | 154153 | 83650 | 17^{h} 05^{m} 48.47^{s} | −44° 06′ 18.4″ | 6.18 | 2.08 | 215 | A4III | |
| HD 162396 | | | | 162396 | 87523 | 17^{h} 52^{m} 52.47^{s} | −41° 59′ 45.8″ | 6.19 | 3.62 | 107 | F8V | |
| HD 155940 | | | | 155940 | 84445 | 17^{h} 15^{m} 51.36^{s} | −30° 12′ 38.2″ | 6.20 | 0.92 | 370 | B9/B9.5V | |
| RS Sco | | | RS | 152476 | 82833 | 16^{h} 55^{m} 37.81^{s} | −45° 06′ 10.7″ | 6.20 | −0.08 | 588 | M6-7e | Mira variable, V_{max} = 5.96^{m}, V_{min} = 13.0^{m}, P = 319 d |
| HD 150573 | | | | 150573 | 81903 | 16^{h} 43^{m} 45.70^{s} | −41° 07′ 08.9″ | 6.21 | 0.61 | 430 | A4V | |
| HD 143900 | | | | 143900 | 78699 | 16^{h} 03^{m} 54.71^{s} | −24° 43′ 34.8″ | 6.22 | −0.09 | 597 | K2/K3III | |
| HD 159633 | | | | 159633 | 86246 | 17^{h} 37^{m} 26.92^{s} | −38° 03′ 58.9″ | 6.26 | −3.44 | 2835 | G2Ib | |
| HD 154025 | | | | 154025 | 83594 | 17^{h} 05^{m} 05.39^{s} | −45° 30′ 07.4″ | 6.28 | 1.33 | 319 | A2V | |
| HD 163433 | | | | 163433 | 87948 | 17^{h} 57^{m} 57.80^{s} | −39° 08′ 11.3″ | 6.28 | 0.29 | 513 | A0IV/V | |
| V900 Sco | | | V900 | 152235 | 82669 | 16^{h} 53^{m} 58.85^{s} | −41° 59′ 39.6″ | 6.29 | | | B1Ia | in Trumpler 24; rotating ellipsoidal variable, V_{max} = 6.29^{m}, V_{min} = 6.34^{m}, P = 2.63 d |
| HD 146834 | | | | 146834 | 79945 | 16^{h} 19^{m} 07.71^{s} | −20° 13′ 04.9″ | 6.29 | 0.40 | 490 | K0III | |
| HD 152636 | | | | 152636 | 82855 | 16^{h} 55^{m} 57.74^{s} | −33° 30′ 24.8″ | 6.29 | 0.03 | 581 | K5III | |
| ν Sco C | ν | 14 | | 145501 | | 16^{h} 11^{m} 58.60^{s} | −19° 26′ 59.0″ | 6.30 | | | | component of the ν Sco system; α^{2} CVn variable |
| HD 152424 | | | | 152424 | 82783 | 16^{h} 55^{m} 03.33^{s} | −42° 05′ 27.0″ | 6.30 | | | O9Ia | in Trumpler 24 |
| HD 155276 | | | | 155276 | 84151 | 17^{h} 12^{m} 16.55^{s} | −38° 49′ 20.7″ | 6.30 | 1.03 | 370 | K1IIICN... | |
| HD 158042 | | | | 158042 | 85549 | 17^{h} 29^{m} 00.86^{s} | −43° 58′ 26.0″ | 6.30 | −2.04 | 1516 | B5III | |
| HD 144585 | | | | 144585 | 78955 | 16^{h} 07^{m} 03.53^{s} | −14° 04′ 16.8″ | 6.32 | 4.02 | 94 | G5V | |
| HD 144661 | | | | 144661 | 79031 | 16^{h} 07^{m} 51.90^{s} | −24° 27′ 44.2″ | 6.32 | 0.97 | 384 | B8IV/V | |
| HD 145997 | | | | 145997 | 79605 | 16^{h} 14^{m} 39.30^{s} | −18° 32′ 07.2″ | 6.32 | 1.63 | 282 | K1III | |
| HD 157038 | | | V975 | 157038 | 85020 | 17^{h} 22^{m} 39.22^{s} | −37° 48′ 16.7″ | 6.33 | | | B4Ia+... | α Cyg variable, V_{max} = 6.27^{m}, V_{min} = 6.35^{m} |
| HD 152431 | | | | 152431 | 82731 | 16^{h} 54^{m} 35.94^{s} | −30° 35′ 14.4″ | 6.34 | −0.09 | 631 | A5IIIm... | suspected variable |
| HD 151965 | | | V911 | 151965 | 82554 | 16^{h} 52^{m} 27.42^{s} | −40° 43′ 23.2″ | 6.35 | 0.07 | 588 | B9p Si | α² CVn variable, V_{max} = 6.32^{m}, V_{min} = 6.38^{m} |
| V1077 Sco | | | V1077 | 156325 | 84650 | 17^{h} 18^{m} 20.51^{s} | −32° 33′ 11.1″ | 6.36 | −1.57 | 1259 | B5III | Be star |
| HD 158156 | | | | 158156 | 85589 | 17^{h} 29^{m} 25.60^{s} | −38° 31′ 01.0″ | 6.38 | 1.34 | 332 | A1V | |
| HD 162678 | | | | 162678 | | 17^{h} 53^{m} 45.50^{s} | −34° 47′ 09.7″ | 6.38 | | 980 | B9V | in Messier 7 |
| HD 145792 | | | V1051 | 145792 | 79530 | 16^{h} 13^{m} 45.50^{s} | −24° 25′ 19.4″ | 6.40 | 0.69 | 453 | B6IV | SX Ari variable |
| HD 146436 | | | | 146436 | 79788 | 16^{h} 16^{m} 59.20^{s} | −20° 06′ 14.7″ | 6.40 | −0.03 | 631 | G8III | |
| HD 145964 | | | | 145964 | 79599 | 16^{h} 14^{m} 28.89^{s} | −21° 06′ 27.2″ | 6.41 | 1.29 | 345 | B9V | |
| HD 161390 | | | | 161390 | 87042 | 17^{h} 47^{m} 07.30^{s} | −38° 06′ 43.5″ | 6.41 | 1.07 | 381 | A0V | |
| V951 Sco | | | V951 | 162725 | 87624 | 17^{h} 53^{m} 58.13^{s} | −34° 49′ 51.8″ | 6.41 | −0.96 | 973 | Ap... | in Messier 7, α² CVn variable, V_{max} = 6.39^{m}, V_{min} = 6.44^{m}, P = 4.46 d |
| V915 Sco | | | V915 | 155603 | 84332 | 17^{h} 14^{m} 27.66^{s} | −39° 45′ 59.9″ | 6.42 | | | K0Ia | variable star, V_{max} = 6.22^{m}, V_{min} = 6.64^{m} |
| HD 157060 | | | | 157060 | 85019 | 17^{h} 22^{m} 37.90^{s} | −35° 54′ 39.4″ | 6.42 | 3.58 | 121 | F8V | |
| HD 145100 | | | | 145100 | 79203 | 16^{h} 09^{m} 55.31^{s} | −18° 20′ 25.6″ | 6.43 | 2.96 | 161 | F3V | |
| HD 149174 | | | | 149174 | 81198 | 16^{h} 35^{m} 07.77^{s} | −45° 14′ 39.2″ | 6.43 | 0.06 | 614 | K2/K3III | suspected variable, ΔV = 0.08^{m} |
| HD 158619 | | | | 158619 | 85786 | 17^{h} 31^{m} 47.36^{s} | −33° 42′ 11.1″ | 6.43 | 0.98 | 401 | K2III | |
| HD 160748 | | | | 160748 | 86716 | 17^{h} 43^{m} 06.86^{s} | −33° 03′ 04.6″ | 6.44 | −3.13 | 2672 | M1III | suspected variable |
| HD 147553 | | | | 147553 | 80324 | 16^{h} 23^{m} 56.72^{s} | −33° 11′ 57.6″ | 6.45 | 1.11 | 381 | A0V+... | |
| HD 152249 | | | | 152249 | | 16^{h} 54^{m} 11.64^{s} | −41° 50′ 57.2″ | 6.45 | | 5900 | O9Ib(f) | in NGC 6231; suspected variable, V_{max} = 6.34^{m}, V_{min} = 6.51^{m} |
| HD 150638 | | | | 150638 | 81891 | 16^{h} 43^{m} 38.73^{s} | −32° 06′ 21.2″ | 6.46 | −0.44 | 784 | B8V | |
| HD 155985 | | | | 155985 | 84556 | 17^{h} 17^{m} 05.54^{s} | −44° 46′ 42.9″ | 6.46 | | | B0.5Iab: | Uñallamacha, variable star, ΔV = 0.007^{m}, P = 293.25 d |
| HD 163234 | | | | 163234 | 87865 | 17^{h} 56^{m} 55.89^{s} | −40° 18′ 20.3″ | 6.46 | 0.22 | 576 | K3III | |
| HD 150420 | | | | 150420 | 81803 | 16^{h} 42^{m} 29.11^{s} | −37° 04′ 44.9″ | 6.47 | 1.09 | 388 | G3III | |
| HD 153919 | | | | 153919 | 83499 | 17^{h} 03^{m} 56.77^{s} | −37° 50′ 39.0″ | 6.48 | | | O5f | |
| HD 159312 | | | | 159312 | 86098 | 17^{h} 35^{m} 43.08^{s} | −37° 26′ 23.3″ | 6.48 | 1.40 | 338 | A0V | |
| HD 151932 | | | V919 | 151932 | 82543 | 16^{h} 52^{m} 19.25^{s} | −41° 51′ 16.2″ | 6.49 | | | WN7h | in Trumpler 24; Wolf–Rayet star, V_{max} = 6.45^{m}, V_{min} = 6.61^{m}, P = 2 d |
| HD 153234 | | | | 153234 | 83202 | 17^{h} 00^{m} 14.26^{s} | −44° 59′ 18.5″ | 6.50 | 2.98 | 165 | F3V | |
| 4U 1700-37 | | | V884 | 153919 | 83499 | 17^{h} 03^{m} 56.77^{s} | −37° 50′ 38.9″ | 6.51 | | 9100 | O7.5Iaf | rotating ellipsoidal variable and high-mass X-ray binary, V_{max} = 6.51^{m}, V_{min} = 6.60^{m}, P = 3.41 d |
| HD 145102 | | | V952 | 145102 | 79235 | 16^{h} 10^{m} 15.92^{s} | −26° 54′ 32.8″ | 6.57 | | 547 | B9p... | α^{2} CVn variable, ΔV = 0.04^{m}, P = 1.42 d |
| V453 Sco | | | V453 | 163181 | 87810 | 17^{h} 56^{m} 16.08^{s} | −32° 28′ 30.0″ | 6.61 | −5.43 | 8400 | B0Ia | β Lyr variable, V_{max} = 6.36^{m}, V_{min} = 6.73^{m}, P = 12.01 d |
| RV Sco | | | RV | 153004 | 83059 | 16^{h} 58^{m} 19.75^{s} | −33° 36′ 32.8″ | 6.61 | | 1440 | G0Ib | classical Cepheid, V_{max} = 6.61^{m}, V_{min} = 7.49^{m}, P = 6.06 d |
| HD 160529 | | | V905 | 160529 | 86624 | 17^{h} 41^{m} 59.03^{s} | −33° 30′ 13.7″ | 6.66 | −8.9 | 8150 | A3Iae | luminous blue variable, V_{max} = 6.21^{m}, V_{min} = 6.97^{m}, P = 57 d |
| 25 Sco | | 25 | | 151179 | 82140 | 16^{h} 46^{m} 51.35^{s} | −25° 31′ 42.7″ | 6.72 | −0.10 | 755 | K0II | |
| V636 Sco | | | V636 | 156979 | 85035 | 17^{h} 22^{m} 46.48^{s} | −45° 36′ 51.4″ | 6.74 | | | F7/F8Ib/II + B9.5V | classical Cepheid, V_{max} = 6.4^{m}, V_{min} = 6.92^{m}, P = 6.80 d |
| V760 Sco | | | V760 | 147683 | 80405 | 16^{h} 24^{m} 43.72^{s} | −34° 53′ 37.5″ | 7.05 | | 1280 | B4V | Algol variable |
| HR 5999 | | | V856 | 144668 | 79080 | 16^{h} 08^{m} 34.29^{s} | −39° 06′ 18.3″ | 7.05 | | 531 | A7IVe | UX Ori star, V_{max} = 6.77^{m}, V_{min} = 8.0^{m} |
| HD 143567 | | | | 143567 | 78530 | 16^{h} 01^{m} 55^{s} | −21° 58′ 49″ | 7.18 | | 511 | B9V | has a planet (b) |
| Gliese 667 B | | | | 156384B | | 17^{h} 19^{m} 01.94^{s} | −34° 59′ 33.3″ | 7.24 | 8.02 | 23 | K5 | component of Gliese 667 system |
| HD 159868 | | | | 159868 | 86375 | 17^{h} 38^{m} 59.53^{s} | −43° 08′ 43.8″ | 7.27 | 3.66 | 172 | G5V | has two planets (b & c) |
| HD 147010 | | | V933 | 147010 | 80024 | 16^{h} 20^{m} 05.49^{s} | −20° 03′ 23.0″ | 7.37 | | 533 | B9II/III | α^{2} CVn variable, ΔV = 0.045^{m}, P = 3.92 d |
| HD 153950 | | | | 153950 | 83547 | 17^{h} 04^{m} 30.87^{s} | −43° 18′ 35.2″ | 7.39 | 3.91 | 162 | F8V | Rapeto, has a planet (b) |
| HD 153747 | | | V922 | 153747 | 83410 | 17^{h} 02^{m} 53.82^{s} | −38° 27′ 36.8″ | 7.42 | | 588 | A0III | δ Sct variable |
| RY Sco | | | RY | 162102 | 87345 | 17^{h} 50^{m} 32.34^{s} | −33° 42′ 20.4″ | 7.51 | | | F6Ib | classical Cepheid, V_{max} = 7.51^{m}, V_{min} = 8.36^{m}, P = 20.32 d |
| HD 152219 | | | V1292 | 152219 | | 16^{h} 53^{m} 55.56^{s} | −41° 52′ 51.29″ | 7.57 | | 5900 | O9IV | in NGC 6231; Algol variable, V_{max} = 7.57^{m}, V_{min} = 7.80^{m}, P = 4.24 d |
| V393 Sco | | | V393 | 161741 | 87191 | 17^{h} 48^{m} 47.60^{s} | −35° 03′ 29.6″ | 7.59 | | 2400 | B3III | double periodic or Algol variable, V_{max} = 7.39^{m}, V_{min} = 8.31^{m}, P = 7.71 d |
| HD 152218 | | | V1294 | 152218 | | 16^{h} 53^{m} 59.99^{s} | −41° 42′ 52.8″ | 7.61 | | | O9.5IV(n) | in Trumpler 24; Algol variable, V_{max} = 7.58^{m}, V_{min} = 7.67^{m}, P = 5.60 d |
| V703 Sco | | | V703 | 160589 | 86650 | 17^{h} 42^{m} 16.81^{s} | −32° 31′ 23.6″ | 7.85 | | 556 | A9V | double-mode δ Sct variable, V_{max} = 7.58^{m}, V_{min} = 8.04^{m}, P = 0.12 d |
| V482 Sco | | | V482 | 158443 | 85701 | 17^{h} 30^{m} 48.38^{s} | −33° 36′ 36.0″ | 7.91 | | | F9II | classical Cepheid, V_{max} = 7.63^{m}, V_{min} = 8.3^{m}, P = 4.53 d |
| HD 147873 | | | | 147873 | 80486 | 17^{h} 30^{m} 48.38^{s} | −33° 36′ 36.0″ | 7.96 | | 342 | G1V | has two planets (b & c) |
| AH Sco | | | AH | 155161 | 84071 | 17^{h} 11^{m} 17.02^{s} | −32° 19′ 30.7″ | 8.10 | | 12000 | M4-5Ia-Iab | semiregular variable, V_{max} = 6.7^{m}, V_{min} = 9.5^{m}, P = 735 d; one of the largest known stars |
| HD 145377 | | | | 145377 | 79346 | 16^{h} 11^{m} 36.45^{s} | −27° 04′ 41.4″ | 8.12 | 4.31 | 188 | G3V | has a planet (b) |
| HD 144432 | | | | 144432 | 78943 | 16^{h} 06^{m} 57.95^{s} | −27° 43′ 09.8″ | 8.19 | | 522 | F0IIIe+K7V | triple system; Herbig Ae/Be star |
| V1034 Sco | | | V1034 | | | 16^{h} 54^{m} 19.85^{s} | −41° 50′ 09.4″ | 8.23 | | 5900 | O8V | in NGC 6231; Algol variable, V_{max} = 8.23^{m}, V_{min} = 8.63^{m}, P = 2.44 d |
| RZ Sco | | | RZ | 144018 | 78746 | 16^{h} 04^{m} 36.13^{s} | −24° 06′ 00.6″ | 8.3 | | | M3e | semiregular variable, V_{max} = 8.3^{m}, V_{min} = 12.3^{m}, P = 162.1 d |
| HD 158393 | | | V965 | 158393 | 85680 | 17^{h} 30^{m} 33.36^{s} | −33° 39′ 15.9″ | 8.57 | | 937 | G5:IIIe +F0/2IV/V | RS CVn variable, V_{max} = 8.46^{m}, V_{min} = 8.67^{m}, P = 30.52 d |
| V500 Sco | | | V500 | 316354 | 87173 | 17^{h} 48^{m} 37.50^{s} | −30° 28′ 33.5″ | 8.81 | | 1060 | K0 | classical Cepheid, V_{max} = 8.4^{m}, V_{min} = 9.13^{m}, P = 9.32 d |
| HD 142666 | | | V1026 | 142666 | | 15^{h} 56^{m} 40.02^{s} | −22° 01′ 40.0″ | 8.86 | | | A8Ve | UX Ori star, V_{max} = 8.57^{m}, V_{min} = 9.5^{m} |
| V907 Sco | | | V907 | 163302 | | 17^{h} 56^{m} 55.56^{s} | −34° 45′ 01.2″ | 8.86 | | | B9V | Algol variable, V_{max} = 8.61^{m}, V_{min} = 9.2^{m}, P = 3.78 d |
| V718 Sco | | | V718 | 145718 | 79476 | 16^{h} 13^{m} 11.59^{s} | −22° 29′ 06.7″ | 8.86 | | 383 | A8III/IV | UX Ori star, V_{max} = 8.75^{m}, V_{min} = 10.30^{m} |
| V701 Sco | | | V701 | 317844 | 85985 | 17^{h} 34^{m} 24.51^{s} | −32° 30′ 16.0″ | 8.97 | | 3500 | B5V | W UMa variable, V_{max} = 8.63^{m}, V_{min} = 9.05^{m}, P = 0.76 d |
| AK Sco | | | AK | 152404 | 82747 | 16^{h} 54^{m} 44.85^{s} | −36° 53′ 18.6″ | 9.00 | | 335 | F5Ve | UX Ori star, V_{max} = 8.7^{m}, V_{min} = 12.8^{m} |
| HD 326823 | | | V1104 | 326823 | | 17^{h} 06^{m} 53.91^{s} | −42° 39′ 39.7″ | 9.03 | | | O+... | luminous blue variable, V_{max} = 8.88^{m}, V_{min} = 9.20^{m}, P = 6.12 d |
| HD 162020 | | | | 162020 | 87330 | 17^{h} 50^{m} 38.35^{s} | −40° 19′ 06.1″ | 9.12 | | 95.94 | K3V | has a brown dwarf companion |
| GSC 06214-00210 | | | | | | 16^{h} 21^{m} 55^{s} | −20° 43′ 07″ | 9.15 | | 473 | M1 | has a planet (b) |
| KQ Sco | | | KQ | 328953 | 82498 | 16^{h} 51^{m} 38.55^{s} | −45° 25′ 36.1″ | 9.33 | | 1120 | K7 | classical Cepheid, V_{max} = 9.33^{m}, V_{min} = 10.26^{m}, P = 28.71 d |
| HD 318107 | | | V970 | 318107 | | 17^{h} 39^{m} 41.26^{s} | −32° 17′ 57.4″ | 9.34 | | | B8 | α^{2} CVn variable |
| WR 86 | | | V1035 | 156327 | 84655 | 17^{h} 18^{m} 23.06^{s} | −34° 24′ 30.6″ | 9.35 | | 1770 | WC7+B0III | β Cep variable, ΔV = 0.017^{m}, P = 0.15 d |
| CD -35 11760 | | | V1037 | 320156 | | 17^{h} 37^{m} 58.50^{s} | −35° 23′ 04.32″ | 9.83 | | | B4Ibe | PV Tel variable, V_{max} = 9.62^{m}, V_{min} = 9.83^{m} |
| AI Sco | | | AI | 320921 | | 17^{h} 56^{m} 18.57^{s} | −33° 48′ 43.4″ | 9.98 | | | G4 | RV Tau variable, V_{max} = 8.88^{m}, V_{min} = 11.6^{m}, P = 71.9 d |
| Gliese 667 C | | | | 156384C | | 17^{h} 18^{m} 58.69^{s} | −34° 59′ 48.3″ | 10.22 | 11.00 | 23 | M1.5 | component of Gliese 667 system; has two planets (b) (c) |
| Pismis 24-1 | | | | 319718 | | 17^{h} 24^{m} 43.41^{s} | −34° 11′ 56.5″ | 10.43 | −7.3 | 8150 | O3 If* | one of the most luminous stars known |
| Gliese 682 | | | | | 86214 | 17^{h} 37^{m} 03.66^{s} | −44° 19′ 09.2″ | 10.95 | | 16.557 | M3.5 | |
| CD -38 10980 | | | | | | 16^{h} 23^{m} 33.84^{s} | −39° 13′ 46.2″ | 11.03 | | 42.89 | DA2 | white dwarf |
| Scorpius X-1 | | | V818 | | | 16^{h} 19^{m} 55.07^{s} | −15° 38′ 24.8″ | 11.1 | | 11000 | Oev | low-mass X-ray binary |
| HIP 79431 | | | | | 79431 | 16^{h} 12^{m} 41.77^{s} | −18° 52′ 31.8″ | 11.34 | 10.47 | 49 | M3V | Sharjah, has a planet (b) |
| V921 Sco | | | V921 | | | 16^{h} 59^{m} 06.79^{s} | −42° 42′ 08.6″ | 11.43 | | | Bep | γ Cas variable, ΔV = 0.3^{m} |
| WASP-17 | | | | | | 15^{h} 59^{m} 50.95^{s} | −28° 03′ 42.3″ | 11.59 | | 1000 | F4 | Dìwö, has a transiting planet (b) |
| HK Sco | | | HK | | | 16^{h} 54^{m} 41.04^{s} | −30° 23′ 06.7″ | 11.7 | | | | Z And variable, V_{max} = 11.7^{m}, V_{min} = 14.7^{m}, P = 458 d |
| T Sco | | | T | | | 16^{h} 17^{m} 02.83^{s} | −22° 58′ 31.3″ | 12.0 | | 32600 | | in Messier 80; nova, V_{max} = 6.8^{m}, V_{min} = <12.0^{m} |
| V866 Sco | | | V866 | | | 16^{h} 11^{m} 31.40^{s} | −18° 38′ 24.5″ | 12.05 | | | K5 | T Tau star, ΔV = 0.5^{m}, P = 6.78 d |
| V1094 Sco | | | V1094 | | | 16^{h} 08^{m} 36.18^{s} | −39° 23′ 02.5″ | 12.5 | | | K6 | young stellar object, ΔV = 0.5^{m} |
| 1RXS J160929.1−210524 | | | | | | 16^{h} 09^{m} 30.31^{s} | −21° 04′ 57.6″ | 12.97 | 7.17 | 470 | K7V | has a planet (b) |
| IRAS 17163−3907 | | | | | | 17^{h} 19^{m} 49.33^{s} | −39° 10′ 37.9″ | 13.1 | | | | in Fried Egg Nebula; yellow hypergiant |
| CL Sco | | | CL | | | 16^{h} 54^{m} 51.98^{s} | −30° 37′ 18.2″ | 13.25 | | | M4 | Z And variable and re-radiating binary system, V_{max} = 10.8^{m}, V_{min} = 13.7^{m}, P = 625 d |
| GRO J1655-40 | | | V1033 | | | 16^{h} 54^{m} 00.14^{s} | −39° 50′ 44.9″ | 14.2 | | | B9V | X-ray nova containing black hole, V_{max} = 14^{m}, V_{min} = 17.3^{m} |
| XTE J1739-302 | | | | | | 17^{h} 39^{m} 11.58^{s} | −30° 20′ 37.6″ | 14.8 | | | O8.5Iab(f) | high-mass X-ray binary |
| OGLE-2005-BLG-390L | | | | | | 17^{h} 54^{m} 19^{s} | −30° 22′ 38″ | 15.7 | | 21000 | M4 | has a planet (b) |
| Th 28 | | | V1190 | | | 16^{h} 08^{m} 29.73^{s} | −39° 03′ 11.0″ | 16.42 | | | K0: | T Tau star, V_{max} = 16.42^{m}, V_{min} = 16.93^{m} |
| MXB 1735-44 | | | V926 | | | 17^{h} 38^{m} 58.3^{s} | −44° 27′ 00″ | 17.4 | | | | X-ray burster, ΔV = 0.2^{m}, P = 0.19 d |
| Wray 17-96 | | | | | | 17^{h} 41^{m} 35.2^{s} | −30° 06′ 39.6″ | 17.8 | −10.9 | 15000 | B3 | luminous blue variable, one of the most luminous stars known |
| V992 Sco | | | V992 | | | 17^{h} 07^{m} 17.44^{s} | −43° 15′ 22.0″ | 18.0 | | | | nova, V_{max} = 7.26^{m}, V_{min} = 18.0^{m}, P = 0.15 d |
| V1187 Sco | | | V1187 | | | 17^{h} 29^{m} 18.81^{s} | −31° 46′ 01.5″ | 18.0 | | | | nova, V_{max} = 9.6^{m}, V_{min} = 18^{m} |
| V1186 Sco | | | V1186 | | | 17^{h} 12^{m} 51.21^{s} | −30° 56′ 37.2″ | 18.0 | | | | nova, V_{max} = 9.7^{m}, V_{min} = <18^{m} |
| GX 349+2 | | | V1101 | | | 17^{h} 05^{m} 44.49^{s} | −36° 25′ 23.1″ | 18.6 | | | | low-mass X-ray binary, V_{max} = 18.3^{m}, V_{min} = 19.3^{m}, P = 0.94 d |
| U Sco | | | U | | | 16^{h} 22^{m} 30.80^{s} | −17° 52′ 43.2″ | 19.3 | | | | recurrent nova and eclipsing binary, V_{max} = 7.5^{m}, V_{min} = 19.3^{m}, P = 1.23 d |
| V745 Sco | | | V745 | | | 17^{h} 55^{m} 22.27^{s} | −33° 15′ 58.5″ | 19.3 | | | | nova and rotating ellipsoidal variable, V_{max} = 9.4^{m}, V_{min} = 19.3^{m}, P = 510 d |
| OGLE-2005-BLG-071L | | | | | | 17^{h} 50^{m} 09^{s} | −34° 40′ 23″ | 19.5 | | 11000 | M? | has a planet (b) |
| V1280 Sco | | | V1280 | | | 16^{h} 57^{m} 40.91^{s} | −32° 20′ 36.4″ | 20.0 | | | | nova, V_{max} = 3.78^{m}, V_{min} = <20.0^{m} |
| V1309 Sco | | | V1309 | | | 17^{h} 57^{m} 33.02^{s} | −30° 43′ 10.4″ | 20.4 | | | | luminous red nova, V_{max} = 7.9^{m}, V_{min} = 20.4^{m} |
| PSR B1620−26 | | | | | | 16^{h} 23^{m} 38.22^{s} | −26° 31′ 53.8″ | 21.30 | | | | in Messier 4; pulsar/white dwarf binary; has a planet |
| MOA-2008-BLG-310L | | | | | | 17^{h} 05^{m} 14.53^{s} | −34° 46′ 41.0″ | 23.38 | | 20000 | | has a planet (b) |
| FQ Sco | | | FQ | | | 17^{h} 08^{m} 04.51^{s} | −32° 42′ 02.2″ | | | | | SS Cyg variable |
| V455 Sco | | | V455 | | | 17^{h} 07^{m} 21.73^{s} | −34° 05′ 14.5″ | | | | | Z And variable |
| V893 Sco | | | V893 | | | 16^{h} 15^{m} 15.15^{s} | −28° 37′ 30.1″ | | | | | SU UMa variable and eclipsing binary |
| V1018 Sco | | | V1018 | | | 17^{h} 35^{m} 02.72^{s} | −33° 33′ 29.4″ | | | | | semiregular variable |
| H1-36 | | | | | | 17^{h} 49^{m} 48.22^{s} | −33° 01′ 27.9″ | | | | M8 | in NGC 6441; symbiotic star |
| IGR J17252-3616 | | | | | | 17^{h} 25^{m} 11.4^{s} | −36° 16′ 59″ | | | | B0-1Ia | high-mass X-ray binary |
| OAO 1657-415 | | | | | | 17^{h} 00^{m} 47.9^{s} | −41° 40′ 23″ | | | | B3:Ia-ab... | high-mass X-ray binary |
| Rapid Burster | | | | | | 17^{h} 33^{m} 24.61^{s} | −33° 23′ 19.8″ | | | | | low-mass X-ray binary |
| GX 340+0 | | | | | | 16^{h} 45^{m} 47.7^{s} | −45° 36′ 40″ | | | | | low-mass X-ray binary |
| H1743-322 | | | | | | 17^{h} 46^{m} 15.61^{s} | −32° 14′ 00.6″ | | | | | low-mass X-ray binary |
| OAO 1657-415 | | | | | | 17^{h} 00^{m} 48.884^{s} | −41° 39′ 21.46″ | | | 23200 | Ofpe/WN9 + Q | high-mass X-ray binary |
| IGR J17091-3624 | | | | | | 17^{h} 09^{m} 08^{s} | −36° 22′ 24″ | | | | B9V | low-mass X-ray binary containing black hole |
| 4U 1702-42 | | | | | | 17^{h} 06^{m} 15.31^{s} | −43° 02′ 08.7″ | | | | | low-mass X-ray binary |
| 4U 1705-44 | | | | | | 17^{h} 08^{m} 54.47^{s} | −44° 06′ 07.4″ | | | | | low-mass X-ray binary |
| 4U 1722-307 | | | | | | 17^{h} 27^{m} 33.25^{s} | −30° 48′ 07.4″ | | | | | in Terzan 2; low-mass X-ray binary |
| 4U 1728-34 | | | | | | 17^{h} 31^{m} 57.73^{s} | −33° 50′ 02.5″ | | | | | low-mass X-ray binary |
| 4U 1746-371 | | | | | | 17^{h} 50^{m} 12.66^{s} | −37° 03′ 08.2″ | | | | | in NGC 6441; low-mass X-ray binary |
| XTE J1751-305 | | | | | | 17^{h} 51^{m} 13.49^{s} | −30° 37′ 23.4″ | | | | | low-mass X-ray binary |
| XTE J1720-318 | | | V1228 | | | 17^{h} 19^{m} 58.99^{s} | −31° 45′ 01.3″ | | | | | X-ray nova |
| GCRT J1745−3009 | | | | | | 17^{h} 45^{m} 05^{s} | −30° 09′ 54″ | | | | B9V | radio source; possible pulsar |
| OGLE-2007-BLG-368L | | | | | | 17^{h} 56^{m} 25.96^{s} | −32° 14′ 14.7″ | | | 19230 | late K? | has a planet (b) |
| UScoCTIO 108 | | | | | | 16^{h} 05^{m} 53.94^{s} | −18° 18′ 42.7″ | | | | M7 | has a low-mass companion |
| PSR B1706−44 | | | | | | 17^{h} 09^{m} 42.73^{s} | −44° 29′ 08.2″ | | | | | pulsar |
| PSR B1737−30 | | | | | | 17^{h} 40^{m} 33.82^{s} | −30° 15′ 43.5″ | | | | | pulsar |
| PSR J1614−2230 | | | | | | 16^{h} 14^{m} 36.51^{s} | −22° 30′ 31.1″ | | | | | binary millisecond pulsar |
Table legend: • Name = Proper name • B = Bayer designation • F or/and G. = Flamsteed designation or Gould designation • Var = Variable-star designation • HD = Henry Draper Catalogue designation number • HIP = Hipparcos Catalogue designation number • RA = Right ascension for the Epoch/Equinox J2000.0 • Dec = Declination for the Epoch/Equinox J2000.0 • vis. mag. = visual magnitude (m or m_{v}), also known as apparent magnitude • abs. mag. = absolute magnitude (M_{v}) • Dist. (ly) = Distance in light-years from Earth • Sp. class = Spectral class of the star in the stellar classification system • Notes = Common name(s) or alternate name(s); comments; notable properties [for example: multiple star status, range of variability if it is a variable star, exoplanets, etc.]

== See also ==
- Lists of stars by constellation
