= OAO 1657-415 =

High-mass X-ray binary star system in the constellation of Scorpius

Observation data Epoch J2000.0 Equinox ICRS
- Constellation: Scorpius
- Right ascension: 17^{h} 00^{m} 48.884^{s}
- Declination: −41° 39′ 21.46″
- Apparent magnitude (V): >23

Characteristics
- Spectral type: Ofpe/WN9
- Apparent magnitude (J): 14.09
- Apparent magnitude (H): 11.68
- Apparent magnitude (K): 10.38
- Variable type: X-ray binary

Astrometry
Radial velocity (R_{v})	57.2±3 km/s
Distance	7,100 pc

Orbit
Period (P)	10.44812±0.00013 days
Semi-amplitude (K_{1}) (primary)	22.1±3.5 km/s

Details

Star
Mass	14.3±0.8 M_{☉}
Radius	24.8±1.5 R_{☉}
Luminosity	~126,000 L_{☉}
Temperature	~20,000 K

Compact object
Mass	1.42±0.26 M_{☉}

Other designations
- AX J1700.7-4139, 2MASS J17004888-4139214

Database references
SIMBAD	data

OAO 1657-415 is a high-mass X-ray binary (HMXB) located in the constellation of Scorpius, over 20,000 light years away. It is believed to be composed of a compact object (likely a neutron star) and a highly evolved massive slash star, with Wolf–Rayet and O-type features in its spectrum, with a spectral type of Ofpe/WN9. OAO 1657-415 is special as it has the largest eccentricity and orbital period of any HMXB, and also because its donor star is much more evolved than many other HMXB donor stars.

== Distance ==
OAO 1657-415 is very far away, located between 4.4 and 12 kiloparsecs from Earth, most likely being about 7.1 kiloparsecs from Earth. However, recent Gaia data suggests a lower distance of just 2.2 kiloparsecs based on the parallax angle of the optical companion.

OAO 1657-415 is extremely reddened. In the visible wavelength, it is reddened by 20.4 magnitudes. Therefore, it is certainly invisible to the naked eye and likely requires at least a very powerful telescope to be seen in visible light. Despite dedicated efforts to locate OAO 1657-415 in the visible band, no optical component was found with a visible magnitude of under 23.

== Orbit ==
OAO 1657-415's two components orbit each other every 10.44812 days, with an eccentricity of 0.107, very high for a HMXB. This orbital period is decreasing at a rate of around 3 seconds a year. Eclipses in the binary last 1.7 days.

== Stellar properties ==
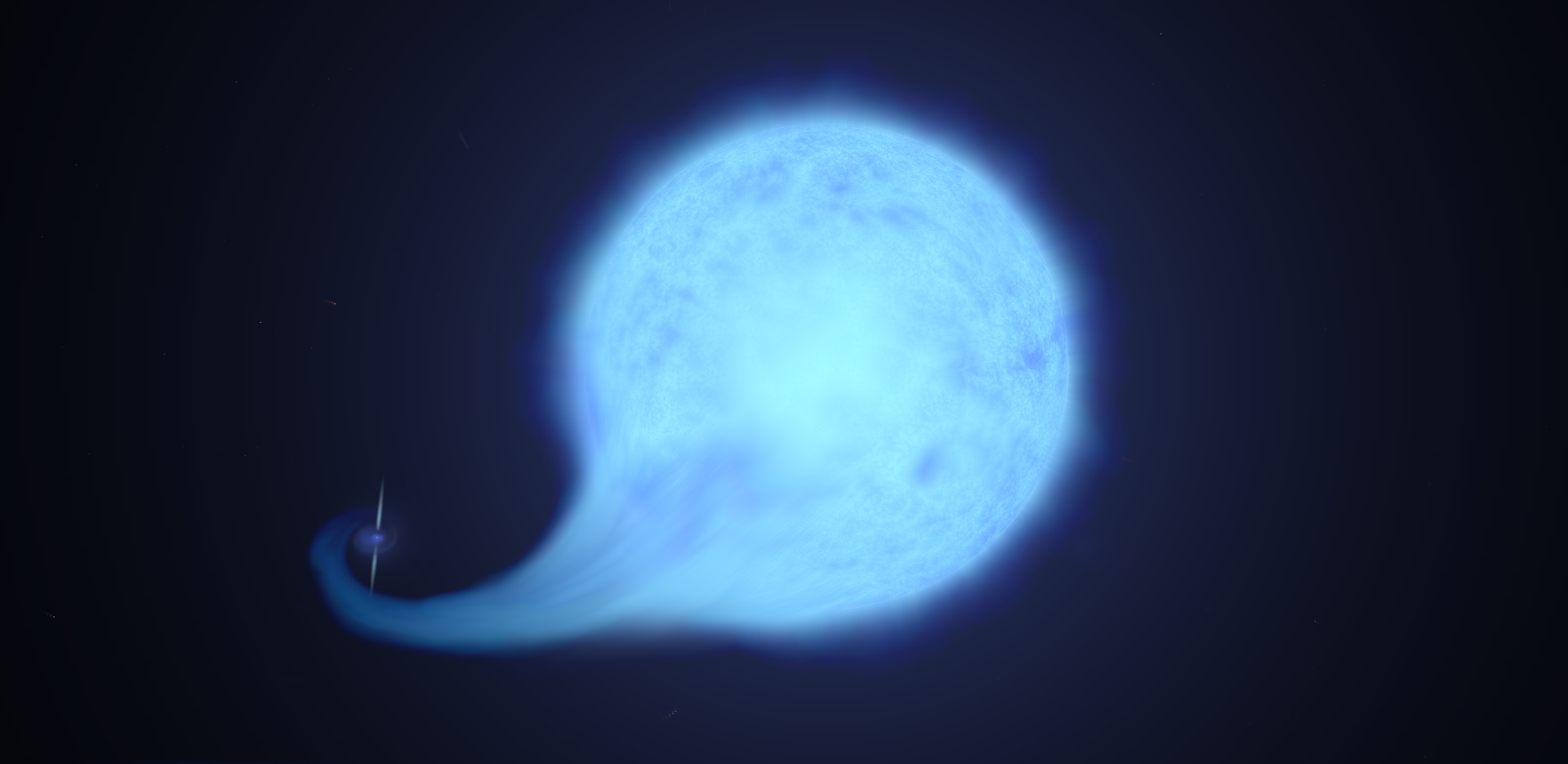
An artist's depiction of OAO 1657-415.

OAO 1657-415's donor star is a very evolved star, clearly more evolved than typical OB supergiant or main sequence HMXB donor stars. This is apparent because OAO 1657-415's atmosphere is severely depleted of hydrogen (X_{H} = 5%), much like many Wolf–Rayet stars. OAO 1657-415 is only the 4th such HMXB found with such an evolved donor star. The only other similar galactic example is Cygnus X-3, an early WN-type Wolf-Rayet star circled by a compact object, either a neutron star or black hole.

An attempt to derive the physical properties of OAO 1657–415, although not able to get a formal fit to the model, was able to determine general estimates for the properties. The donor star has a luminosity of around 126,000 L_{☉} (10^{5.1} L_{☉}), a temperature of around 20,000 K and a radius of ~30 solar radii. However, OAO 1657-415's derived luminosity is quite low for a star of its type, implying that it may instead be a B-type supergiant rather than an Ofpe/WNL star. However, this is likely not the case as, for one, its low terminal velocity and mass loss rate is incompatible with many values found at B-type supergiants. Also, B-type supergiants normally have 5 times more hydrogen than helium (X_{H} = 83%), and this is clearly not the case. Some late-type Wolf-Rayet stars with similarly low concentrations of hydrogen and comparable radii have been found, such as the emission-line star V1104 Scorpii, which is entering the Wolf-Rayet stage as a WN8 star with a radius of 30 RSol and an X_{H} value of just 3%. WR 123, another WN8 star, has a very low X_{H} value that could be as low as 0.5%, and yet has a radius of ~7 RSol.

=== Future of the binary ===
Just prior to core collapse, the mass of a Wolf-Rayet star, like what OAO 1657-415 will imminently become is 5-10 MSol. If OAO 1657-415 continues to lose its mass through its strong fast stellar wind, the two stars will orbit each other in over 65 days when the donor star's mass is reduced to 5 MSol prior to core collapse in under 1 million years. If, after the death of the donor star, its core becomes a neutron star, the supernova produced can disrupt the binary by getting rid of much of one star's mass. However, a supernova can kick a neutron star a certain direction in order for it to remain bound to the other, depending on the direction of this kick. This will produce a double neutron star system with a period longer than the longest period double neutron star system known, PSR J1811-1736, which has an orbital period of 18.8 days.
