= V1073 Scorpii =

Variable star in the constellation Scorpius

- Location of V1073 Scorpii (circled)

Observation data Epoch J2000.0 Equinox ICRS
- Constellation: Scorpius
- Right ascension: 17^{h} 04^{m} 49.35254^{s}
- Declination: −34° 07′ 22.5483″
- Apparent magnitude (V): +4.82 to 4.88

Characteristics
- Spectral type: B0.7 Ia
- U−B color index: −0.69
- B−V color index: +0.26
- Variable type: α Cyg

Astrometry
Radial velocity (R_{v})	7.00 km/s
Proper motion (μ)	RA: +0.600 mas/yr Dec.: −2.015 mas/yr
Parallax (π)	1.1161±0.2097 mas
Distance	approx. 2,900 ly (approx. 900 pc)
Absolute magnitude (M_{V})	−6.8

Details
Mass	28; 19.7±1.0; 27.11±8.39 M_{☉}
Radius	36.0 R_{☉}
Luminosity	302,000 L_{☉}
Surface gravity (log g)	2.70; 2.65 cgs
Temperature	20,800; 22,500 K
Rotational velocity (v sin i)	47 km/s
Age	4.2±0.3 Myr

Other designations
- k Sco, V1073 Sco, CD−33°11706, HD 154090, HIP 83574, HR 6334, SAO 208377

Database references
SIMBAD	data

V1073 Scorpii is a variable star in the constellation Scorpius. It has a non-Greek Bayer designation of k Scorpii. The star has a blue-white hue and is visible to the naked eye with an apparent visual magnitude that fluctuates around +4.8. Parallax measurements yield a distance estimate of approximately 2,920 ly (896 pc) from the Sun, and it is drifting further away with a radial velocity of +7 km/s. It has an absolute magnitude of −6.8

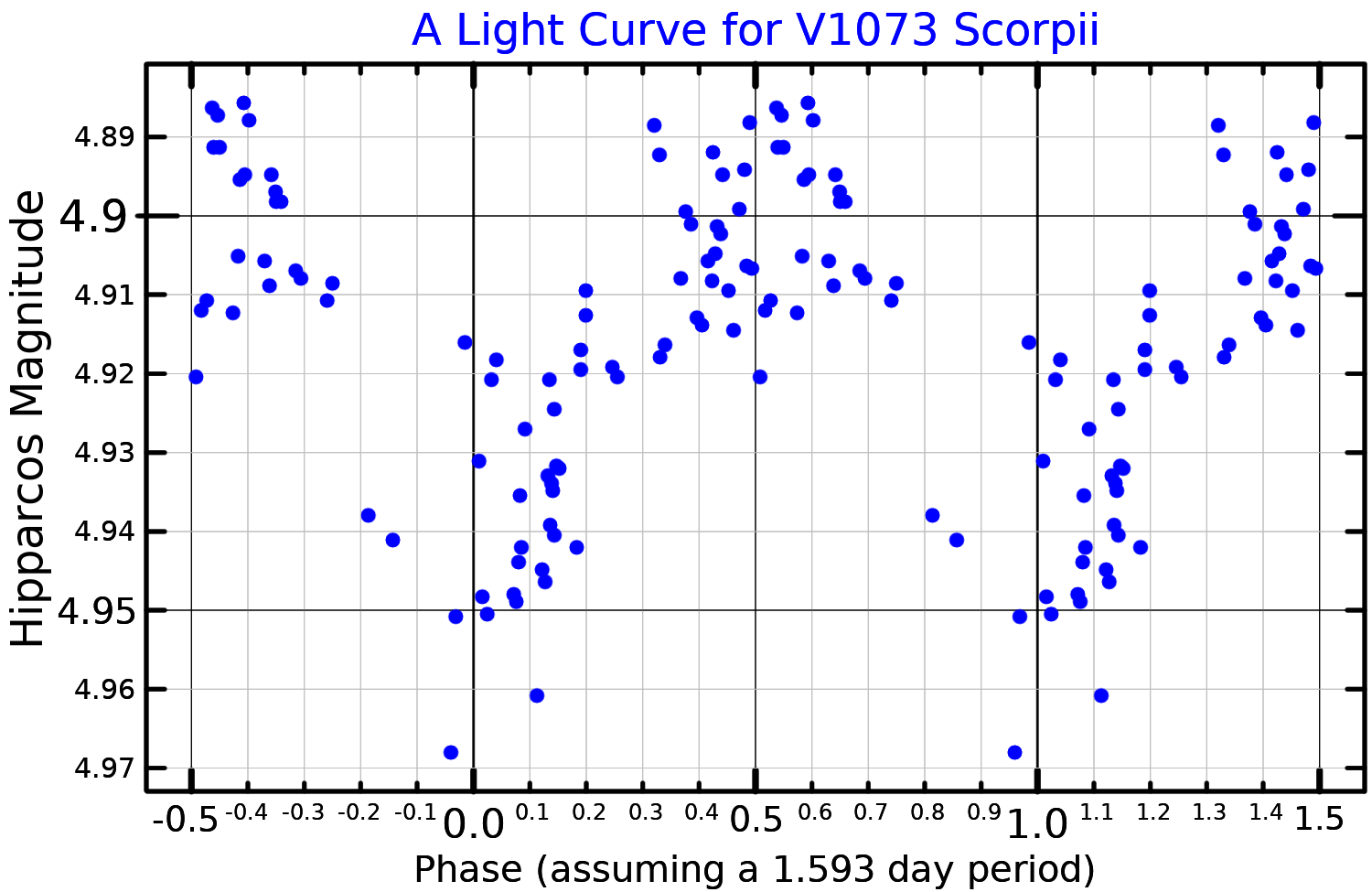
A light curve for V1073 Scorpii, adapted from Lefèvre et al. (2009)

This object is a massive supergiant star with a stellar classification of B0.7 Ia. It was found to be a variable star in 1996, when the Hipparcos data was analysed. It was given its variable star designation in 1999. It is an α Cygni variable; a supergiant that pulsates erratically on a timescale of days to weeks with an amplitude of less than a tenth of a magnitude. A simplistic fitting of Hipparcos data suggests a periodicity of 1.6 days. The star is around 4.2 million years old and is a member of the Upper Scorpius subgroup of the Sco OB2 association. V1073 Scorpii is considered a "runaway" star, showing a peculiar velocity of more than 37 km/s relative to its neighbourhood. No bow shock has been detected from its motion through interstellar space.

V1073 Sco has a 14th magnitude visual companion, which is an unrelated background object according to its Gaia Data Release 2 parallax.
