= HD 163376 =

Star in the constellation of Scorpius

- Location of HD 163376 (circled in red)

Observation data Epoch J2000 Equinox ICRS
- Constellation: Scorpius
- Right ascension: 17^{h} 57^{m} 47.80338^{s}
- Declination: −41° 42′ 58.6612″
- Apparent magnitude (V): 4.88

Characteristics
- Evolutionary stage: asymptotic giant branch
- Spectral type: M0 III
- B−V color index: 1.617±0.081
- Variable type: suspected

Astrometry
Radial velocity (R_{v})	4.4±2.8 km/s
Proper motion (μ)	RA: −3.97±0.35 mas/yr Dec.: −15.02±0.13 mas/yr
Parallax (π)	7.22±0.27 mas
Distance	450 ± 20 ly (139 ± 5 pc)
Absolute magnitude (M_{V})	−0.82

Details
Mass	1.12 M_{☉}
Radius	61+6 −7 R_{☉}
Luminosity	832±42 L_{☉}
Surface gravity (log g)	0.79 cgs
Temperature	3,972+244 −194 K
Metallicity [Fe/H]	+0.04 dex

Other designations
- NSV 24051, CD−41°12231, HD 163376, HIP 87936, HR 6682, SAO 228578

Database references
SIMBAD	data

HD 163376 is a single star in the southern constellation of Scorpius. It has a ruddy hue and is faintly visible to the naked eye with an apparent visual magnitude of 4.88. The distance to this star, as determined using parallax measurements, is approximately 450 light years. It is drifting further from the Sun with a radial velocity of about 4 km/s. The absolute magnitude of this star is −0.82.

This object is an aging red giant star with a stellar classification of M0 III, having exhausted the supply of hydrogen at its core then cooled and expanded. At present it has a radius around 61 times the radius of the Sun. It is a suspected variable star of unknown type, with a brightness that has been measured ranging from 4.94 down to 4.98. The star is radiating 832 times the Sun's luminosity from its photosphere at an effective temperature of 3,972 K.
