= 1 Scorpii =

Star in the constellation Scorpius

- Location of 1 Scorpii (circled in red)

Observation data Epoch J2000.0 Equinox J2000.0
- Constellation: Scorpius
- Right ascension: 15^{h} 50^{m} 58.74452^{s}
- Declination: −25° 45′ 04.6649″
- Apparent magnitude (V): 4.63

Characteristics
- Spectral type: B1.5 Vn
- B−V color index: −0.072±0.003

Astrometry
Radial velocity (R_{v})	−3.0±4.7 km/s
Proper motion (μ)	RA: −14.20 mas/yr Dec.: −25.12 mas/yr
Parallax (π)	6.59±0.27 mas
Distance	490 ± 20 ly (152 ± 6 pc)
Absolute magnitude (M_{V})	−1.27

Details
Mass	8.3±0.2 M_{☉}
Radius	3.7 R_{☉}
Luminosity	3,890 L_{☉}
Temperature	24,000 K
Rotational velocity (v sin i)	310 km/s
Age	10.3±5.3 Myr

Other designations
- b Sco, 1 Sco, CD−25°11131, HD 141637, HIP 77635, HR 5885, SAO 183854

Database references
SIMBAD	data

1 Scorpii, or b Scorpii, is a single star in the southern zodiac constellation of Scorpius. It has an apparent magnitude of 4.63, which is bright enough to be faintly visible to the naked eye on a dark night. The star shows an annual parallax shift of 6.59 mas from Earth's orbit, which equates to a distance of roughly 490 light years. It is a probable (89% chance) member of the Sco OB2 moving group.

This is a B-type main-sequence star with a stellar classification of B1.5 Vn, where the 'n' suffix indicates "nebulous" absorption lines being induced by rapid rotation. It has a projected rotational velocity of 310 km/s, which is giving the star an oblate shape with an equatorial bulge that is 13% wider than the polar radius. There is some weak evidence that this is a Be star with a gaseous disk that is being viewed edge-on.

1 Scorpii is a young star at around 10 million years old, with 8.3 times the mass of the Sun and 3.7 times the Sun's radius. The star is radiating 3,890 times the Sun's luminosity from its photosphere at an effective temperature of about 24,000 K.
