= Psi Scorpii =

White-hued star in the constellation Scorpius

ψ Scorpii
- Location of ψ Scorpii (circled in red)

Observation data Epoch J2000 Equinox ICRS
- Constellation: Scorpius
- Right ascension: 16^{h} 12^{m} 00.01043^{s}
- Declination: −10° 03′ 50.8353″
- Apparent magnitude (V): 4.94

Characteristics
- Spectral type: A1 V
- U−B color index: +0.11
- B−V color index: +0.09

Astrometry
Radial velocity (R_{v})	−5.10 km/s
Proper motion (μ)	RA: −18.000 mas/yr Dec.: −36.188 mas/yr
Parallax (π)	20.1801±0.2617 mas
Distance	162 ± 2 ly (49.6 ± 0.6 pc)
Absolute magnitude (M_{V})	+1.55

Orbit
Period (P)	10 years
Semi-major axis (a)	6.4 au

Details

ψ Sco A
Mass	1.95 M_{☉}
Radius	2.1 R_{☉}
Luminosity	18.6 L_{☉}
Surface gravity (log g)	4.134±0.071 cgs
Temperature	8,350 K
Rotational velocity (v sin i)	42.3±0.6 km/s
Age	630 Myr

ψ Sco B
Mass	0.64 M_{☉}
Radius	0.60 R_{☉}
Temperature	4,200 K
Age	630 Myr

Other designations
- ψ Sco, 15 Scorpii, BD−09°4324, FK5 3280, GC 21780, HD 145570, HIP 79375, HR 6031, SAO 141022

Database references
SIMBAD	data

Psi Scorpii, which is Latinized from ψ Scorpii, is a binary star in the zodiac constellation of Scorpius. It is white in hue and has an apparent visual magnitude of 4.94, which is bright enough to be faintly visible to the naked eye. Based upon parallax measurements, it is located at a distance of around 162 light years from the Sun. The system is drifting closer to the Sun with a radial velocity of −5 km/s.

== Characteristics ==
Data collected during the Hipparcos mission suggested it is an astrometric binary. The companion was directly detected in 2025, with the GRAVITY instrument at VLTI. The astrometric data is consistent with an orbital period of 10 years, suggesting a separation of 3.4 astronomical units.

The primary component is an A-type main sequence star with a stellar classification of A1 V; a class of star that is still fusing hydrogen at its core. It has around 1.95 the mass and 2.1 times the radius of the Sun, and is shining with 18.6 times the Sun's luminosity. The effective temperature of the star's outer atmosphere is 8,350 K. Psi Scorpii A is around 630 million years old and is spinning with a projected rotational velocity of 42.3 km/s.

The secondary has around 0.64 times the mass, 0.6 times the radius and a temperature of 4,200 K. It is 6.7 magnitudes fainter than the primary.
