= HD 326823 =

Binary star system in the constellation of Scorpius

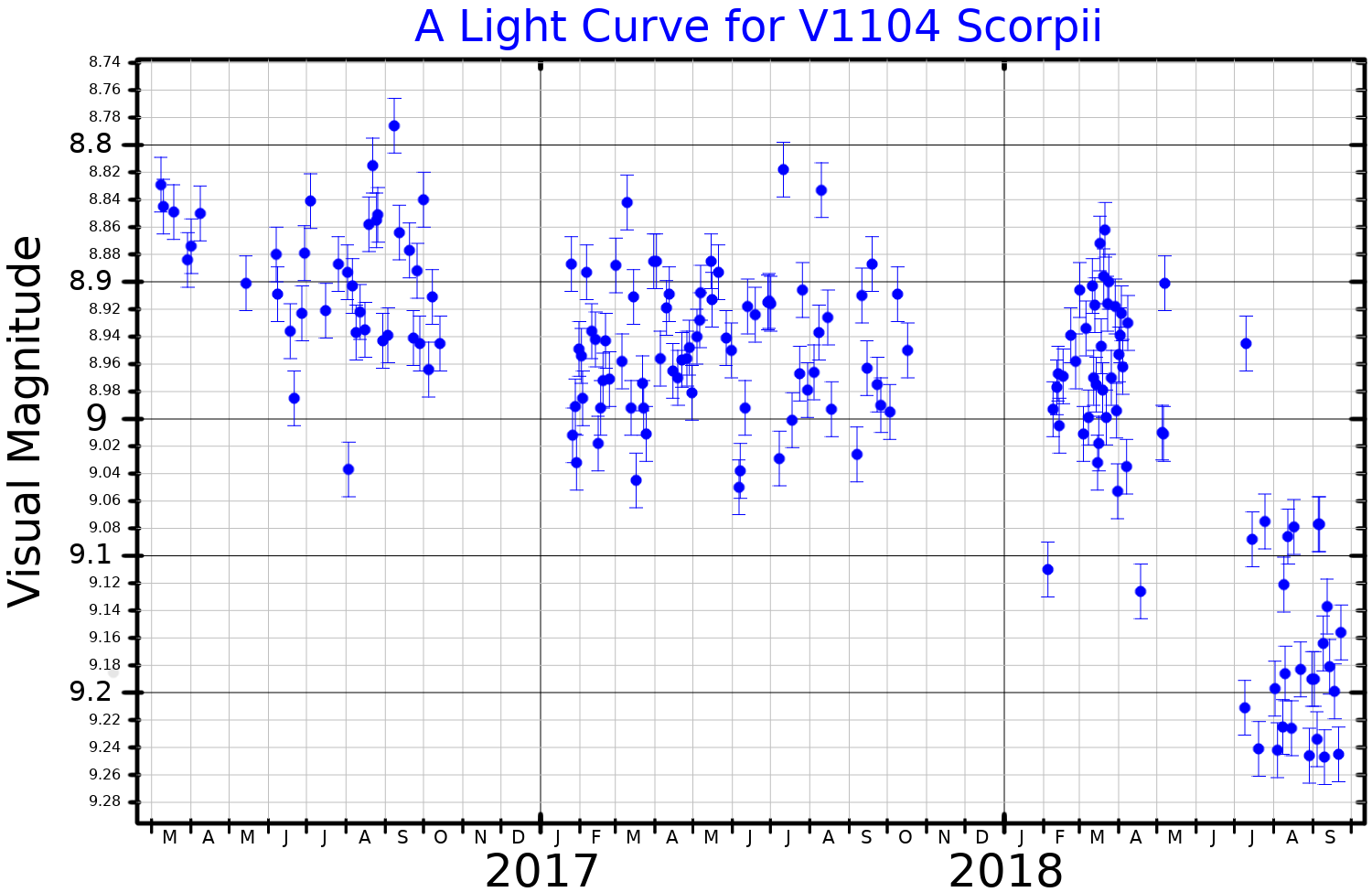
- A visual band light curve for V1104 Scorpii, plotted from ASAS-SN data

Observation data Epoch J2000.0 Equinox J2000.0 (ICRS)
- Constellation: Scorpius
- Right ascension: 17^{h} 06^{m} 53.9045^{s}
- Declination: −42° 36′ 39.704″
- Apparent magnitude (V): 9.03

Characteristics
- Spectral type: WNpec
- U−B color index: -0.19
- B−V color index: 0.84

Astrometry
Proper motion (μ)	RA: +2.545 mas/yr Dec.: −2.251 mas/yr
Parallax (π)	0.6919±0.0193 mas
Distance	1,270 pc

Orbit
Period (P)	6.1228 days
Eccentricity (e)	0.17
Inclination (i)	45°
Argument of periastron (ω) (secondary)	197±14°
Semi-amplitude (K_{1}) (primary)	230±12.7 km/s

Details

WN
Mass	5.5 M_{☉}
Radius	19.51 (Note: Applying the Stefan–Boltzmann law with a nominal solar effective temperature of 5,772 K: $$\sqrt{(5772/22000)^4 * 80,000} = 19.51\ R\odot$$) R_{☉}
Luminosity	80,000 L_{☉}
Temperature	22,000 K

O
Mass	29.1 M_{☉}
Radius	10 R_{☉}

Other designations
- V1104 Scorpii, 2MASS J17065390-4236397

Database references
SIMBAD	data

HD 326823, also known as V1104 Scorpii, is a binary star containing a unique emission-line star, which is in the midst of transitioning to a nitrogen-rich Wolf-Rayet star, as well as being a candidate Luminous blue variable, located 4,142 light years away in the constellation of Scorpius. The primary is very evolved, because it is composed of almost entirely helium, and only 3% of it is still hydrogen, and it has lost most of its mass to the now-very-massive secondary. The underlying mechanisms and mass transfers in the system are comparable to other W Serpentis systems, such as Beta Lyrae and RY Scuti.

== Properties ==
A decade of visual band photometry performed by Christiaan Sterken et al., beginning in 1988, showed that HD 326823 is a variable star. For that reason the star was given its variable star designation, V1104 Scorpii, in the year 2000.

Assuming a distance of 1.27 kiloparsecs, the primary has a temperature of 22,000 K and a luminosity of around 80,000 L_{☉} (~10^{4.9} L_{☉}). This corresponds to a radius about 19.5 R_{☉}. Older analyses included a higher luminosity of 200,000 L_{☉}, and a distance of 2 kpc. The primary star's stellar wind has a very low terminal velocity of just 200 kilometres per second and through that wind is losing 5.2×10^{−6} M_{☉} (about 10^{−5.28} M_{☉}) per year. The primary's mass is around 5.5 M_{☉}, and its initial mass may have been about 25 M_{☉}.

Not much is known about the secondary, except for its mass of 29.1 M_{☉}, a significant part of which may be from the primary. Assuming it is a main sequence star, it may have a radius of 10 R_{☉}.

== Orbit ==
The primary and the secondary orbit each other every 6.123 days. The orbit has an eccentricity of about 0.17, and is inclined at about 45 degrees. The argument of periapsis is about 197 degrees.

== Environment and evolution ==
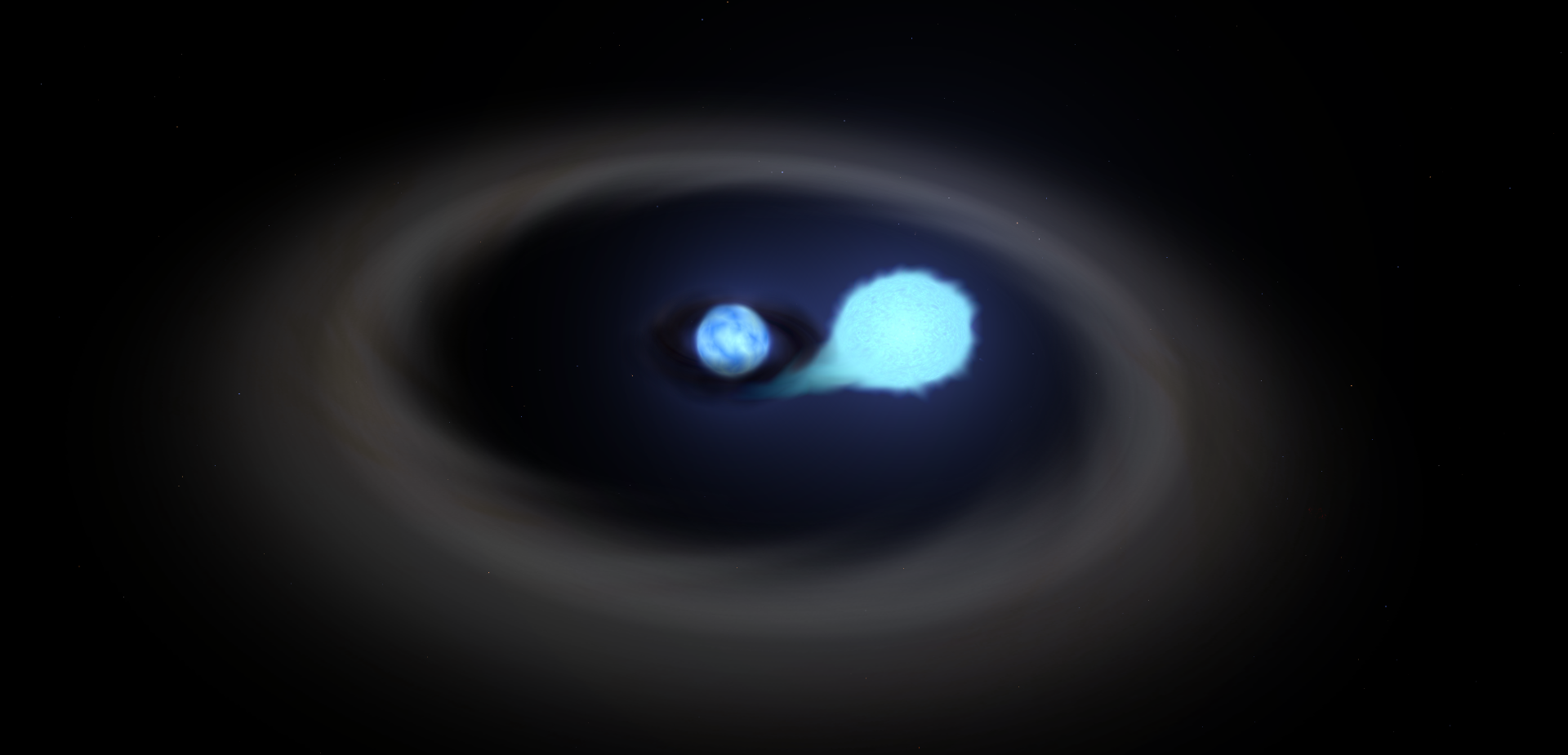
Artist's depiction of HD 326823

The visible star (the primary) is a mass donor, and is transferring mass to the unseen secondary, which is enshrouded in a thick accretion torus. As a result, only the primary (mass donor) is observed. Mass loss occurring at both the L2 and L3 points suggests a large circumbinary disk, which is the source of stationary emission lines in the spectrum. The complex light curve is probably due to the tidal distortion of the primary, as well as variations in the thickness of the torus.

The visible star in HD 326823 has been stripped of its outer layers by the secondary star. If this continues, the system may evolve into a system similar to Gamma Velorum, where the mass donor is now a hydrogen-stripped Wolf-Rayet star, that is orbiting a more massive O-type star, formerly the secondary.

Hydrogen-deficient donor stars in W Ser-esque binaries, such as the primary in HD 326823, will likely explode in Type Ib/c supernovae, after they evolve into Wolf-Rayet stars, and understanding the pre-SN evolution of these stars is critical to the interpretation and modeling of the supernovae they produce.
