= 25 Scorpii =

Star in the constellation Scorpius

Observation data Epoch J2000 Equinox ICRS
- Constellation: Scorpius
- Right ascension: 16^{h} 46^{m} 51.34498^{s}
- Declination: −25° 31′ 42.8647″
- Apparent magnitude (V): 6.71

Characteristics
- Spectral type: K0 II
- B−V color index: +1.18

Astrometry
Radial velocity (R_{v})	−1.31±0.14 km/s
Proper motion (μ)	RA: −4.165 mas/yr Dec.: −15.630 mas/yr
Parallax (π)	3.5599±0.0433 mas
Distance	920 ± 10 ly (281 ± 3 pc)
Absolute magnitude (M_{V})	0.09

Details
Mass	2.075+0.709 −0.993 M_{☉}
Radius	12.719+2.800 −1.943 R_{☉}
Luminosity	135 L_{☉}
Surface gravity (log g)	2.509+0.135 −0.351 cgs
Temperature	4777+76 −133 K
Metallicity [Fe/H]	−0.031+0.150 −0.480 dex

Other designations
- 25 Sco, CD−25°11667, FK5 5482, HD 151179, HIP 82140, HR 6225, SAO 184630

Database references
SIMBAD	data

25 Scorpii (abbreviated to 25 Sco) is a star in the zodiac constellation of Scorpius, located about 920 light years away from the Sun. Its apparent magnitude is 6.71, so its apparent brightness is at the limit of human eyesight and can only be seen under excellent conditions, according to the Bortle scale. The object is moving closer to the Earth with a heliocentric radial velocity of −1.3 km/s. It is a proposed member of the Scorpius–Centaurus association.

This is an evolved bright giant with a spectral type of K0 II. It is about two times more massive and over twelve times wider than the Sun. The star is radiating 135 times the Sun's luminosity from its photosphere at an effective temperature of about 4,700 K.
