= V1280 Scorpii =

Nova

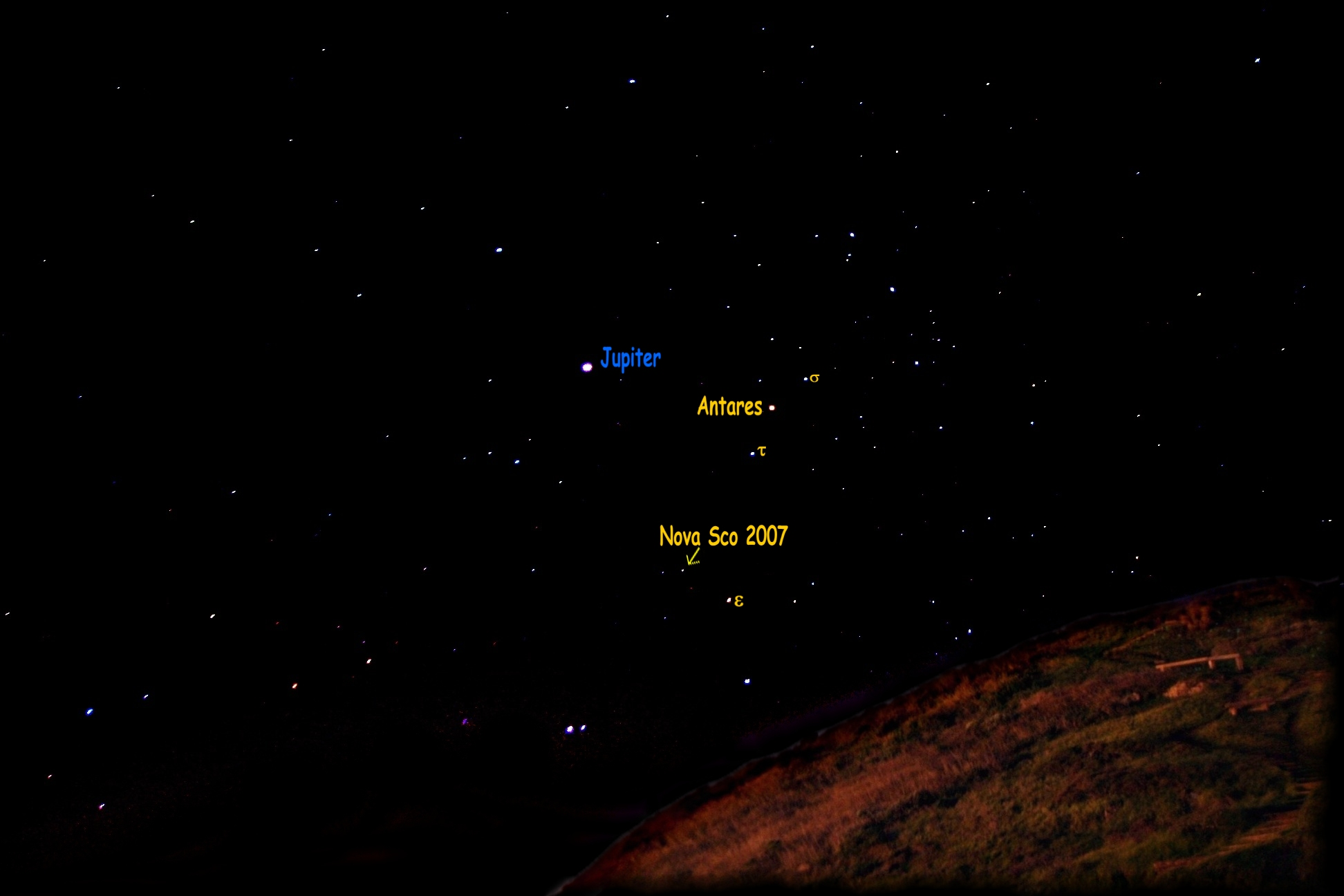
- Nova V1280 Scorpii

Observation data Epoch J2000.0 Equinox ICRS
- Constellation: Scorpius
- Right ascension: 16^{h} 57^{m} 40.91^{s}
- Declination: −32° 20′ 36.4″
- Apparent magnitude (V): +3.78 max

Astrometry
Distance	5200 ± 1300 ly (1600 ± 400 pc)

Database references
SIMBAD	data

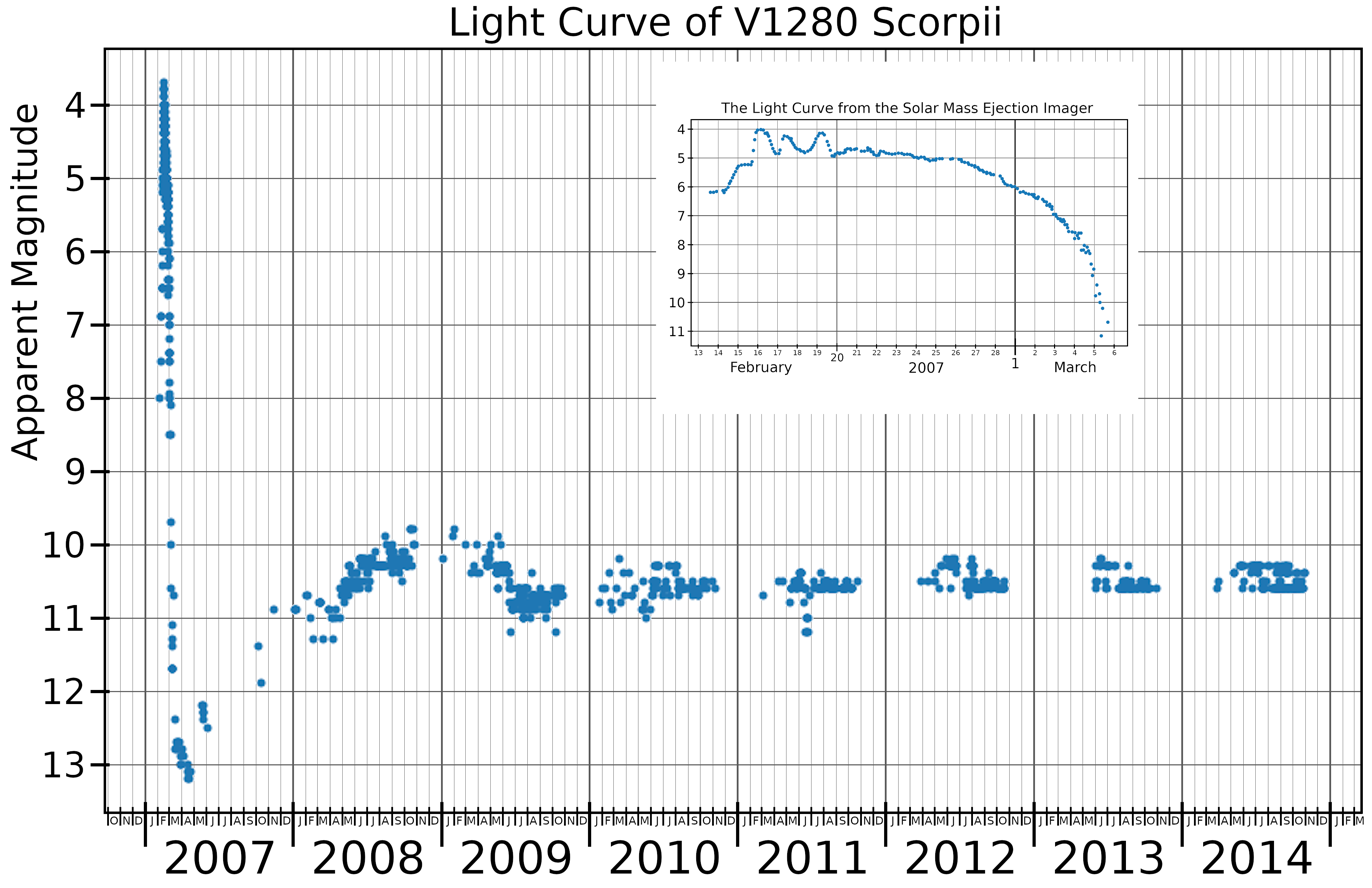
The light curve of V1280 Scorpii, plotted from AAVSO data and (inset) the Solar Mass Ejection Imager light curve covering the time around peak brightness.

V1280 Scorpii (or Nova Scorpii 2007 Number 1) is the first of two novae that occurred in the constellation Scorpius during February 2007 (the second nova was the fainter V1281 Scorpii, which was discovered on 19 February 2007). Announced by the IAU in Electronic Telegram No. 835 and Circular No. 8803, the nova's magnitude was 9.6 when it was discovered on CCD images taken at 20:42 UT on 4 February 2007 by Yuji Nakamura of Kameyama, Mie, Japan. It was independently discovered on the same night at 20:30 UT by Yukio Sakurai of Mito, Ibaraki, Japan. It peaked at magnitude 3.79 on February 17, making it easily visible to the naked eye. V1280 Scorpii is two degrees south of M62.

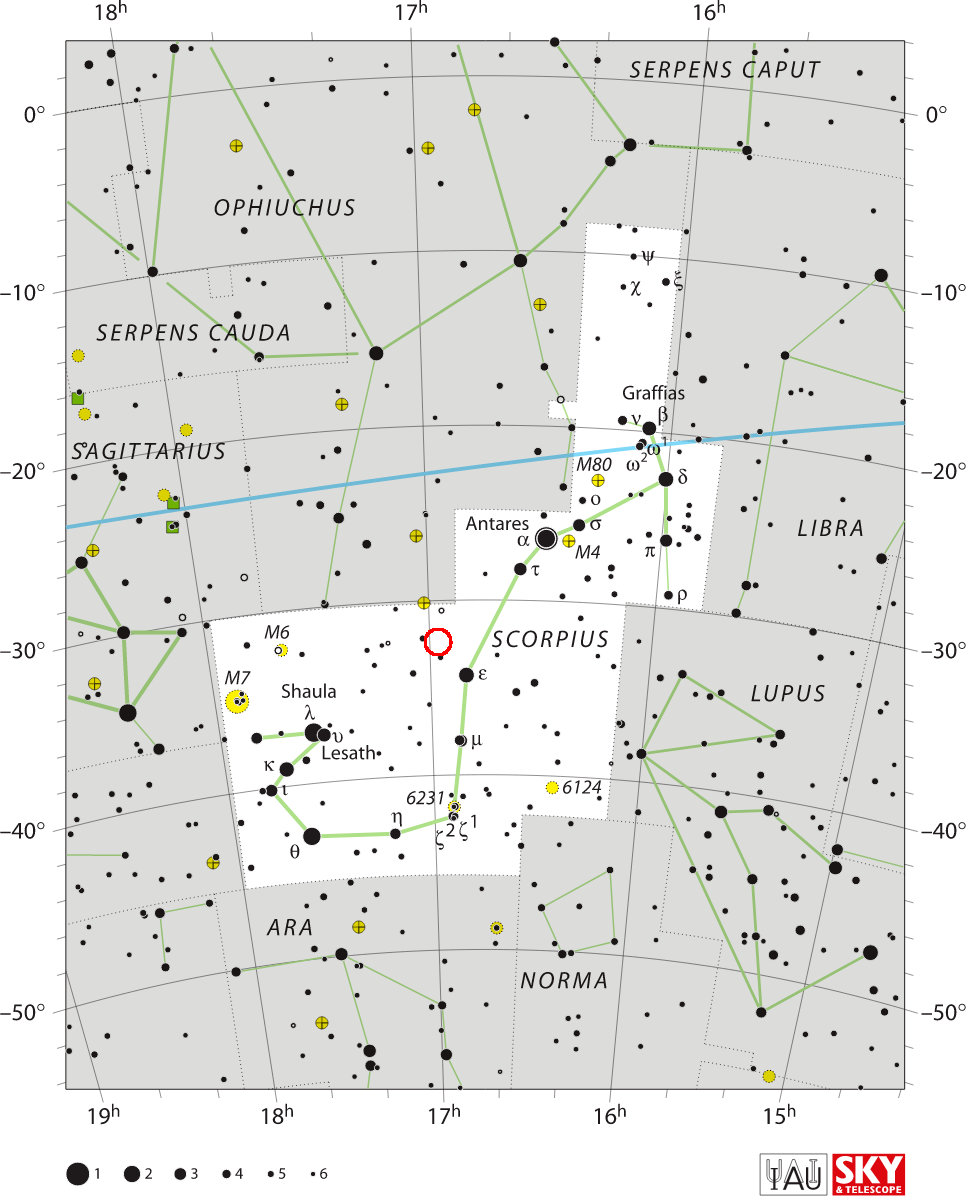
The location of V1280 Scorpii (circled in red)

The early period after V1280 Scorpii's eruption was observed in great detail by the Solar Mass Ejection Imager (SMEI) instrument on the Coriolis satellite. This satellite obtained a brightness value for the nova every 102 minutes. The rise to peak brightness was exceptionally slow. The SMEI light curve shows three well defined maxima for the nova, occurring around 03:00 UT on 16 February, 08:30 UT on 17 February and 05:00 UT on 19 February 2007. The nova declined slowly from peak brightness until the end of February 2007, at which time it began fading rapidly as dust formed in the ejected material. At the same time dust formation was causing the visual light curve to plummet, the infrared brightness increased. The formation of V1280 Scorpii's dusty structure was observed in the near (K-band) and mid (N band) infrared by the VLT interferometer, and the interferometer was able to measure the expansion of the dust shell. These were the first such observations for any nova. On day 100, another brightening was observed, which corresponded to a second mass loss event. The expanding dust shell around the nova has an estimated velocity of 350 km/s. The mass of the nova's white dwarf has been estimated to be 0.6 M_{☉}, based on the SMEI light curve.

The morphology of V1280 Scorpii's nova remnant is complex, but overall bipolar in shape; on either sides of the nova are outflows emitting forbidden lines of oxygen (O III) and nitrogen (N II). Surrounding the center is an equatorial torus of dust, which variably blocks light.
