= HD 161840 =

Star in the constellation Scorpius

- Location of HD 161840 (circled in red)

Observation data Epoch J2000 Equinox ICRS
- Constellation: Scorpius
- Right ascension: 17^{h} 48^{m} 10.47559^{s}
- Declination: −31° 42′ 11.5636″
- Apparent magnitude (V): 4.79

Characteristics
- Spectral type: B8 Ib/II
- B−V color index: −0.028±0.023

Astrometry
Radial velocity (R_{v})	−13.3±2.8 km/s
Proper motion (μ)	RA: +6.845 mas/yr Dec.: −8.161 mas/yr
Parallax (π)	6.5831±0.3618 mas
Distance	500 ± 30 ly (152 ± 8 pc)
Absolute magnitude (M_{V})	−1.37

Details
Mass	3.93±0.08 M_{☉}
Radius	3.2 R_{☉}
Luminosity	565+59 −53 L_{☉}
Surface gravity (log g)	3.38 cgs
Temperature	11066+77 −76 K
Rotational velocity (v sin i)	24 km/s

Other designations
- CD−31°14609, HD 161840, HIP 87220, HR 6628, SAO 209303

Database references
SIMBAD	data

HD 161840 is a single, blue-white hued star in the southern zodiac constellation of Scorpius. It is faintly visible to the naked eye with an apparent visual magnitude of 4.79. With an annual parallax shift of 6.5 mas it is located roughly 500 light years from the Sun. It is moving closer with a heliocentric radial velocity of −13 km/s.

There has been some uncertainty as to the classification of this stage. Houk (1979) lists a stellar class of B8 Ib/II for HD 161840, which corresponds to a B-type bright giant/lesser supergiant mix. Multiple studies still use an older classification of B8 V, suggesting instead this is a B-type main-sequence star. Garrison and Gray (1994) assigned it a class of B8 III-IV, which would put it on the subgiant/giant star track. It has an estimated 3.93 times the mass of the Sun and 3.2 times the Sun's radius. The star is radiating 565 times the Sun's luminosity from its photosphere at an effective temperature of 11,066 K.
