= HD 143787 =

Star in the constellation of Scorpius

Observation data Epoch J2000 Equinox ICRS
- Constellation: Scorpius
- Right ascension: 16^{h} 03^{m} 20.62179^{s}
- Declination: −25° 51′ 54.8653″
- Apparent magnitude (V): 4.973

Characteristics
- Evolutionary stage: red clump
- Spectral type: K3 III
- B−V color index: 1.245

Astrometry
Radial velocity (R_{v})	−37.88±0.15 km/s
Proper motion (μ)	RA: −66.608 mas/yr Dec.: −38.657 mas/yr
Parallax (π)	14.3632±0.2020 mas
Distance	227 ± 3 ly (69.6 ± 1.0 pc)
Absolute magnitude (M_{V})	0.909

Details
Mass	1.25 M_{☉}
Radius	14.7 R_{☉}
Luminosity	61.7 L_{☉}
Surface gravity (log g)	2.29 cgs
Temperature	4,370±22 K
Metallicity [Fe/H]	+0.01 dex
Rotational velocity (v sin i)	<1 km/s
Age	4.46 Gyr

Other designations
- CD−25°11295, HD 143787, HIP 78650, HR 5969, SAO 184068

Database references
SIMBAD	data

HD 143787 is a single star in the southern constellation of Scorpius. It is a fifth magnitude star – apparent visual magnitude of 4.973, and hence is visible to the unaided eye. The distance to HD 143787 can be estimated from its annual parallax shift of 14.4 mas, yielding a separation of 227 light years. It is moving closer to Earth with a heliocentric radial velocity of −37.9 km/s, and should come within 106.4 ly in 1.2 million years.

This is an evolved giant star with a stellar classification of K3 III. It is a red clump giant, which means it is on the horizontal branch and is generating energy through helium fusion at its core. At the age of 4.46 billion years, it has 1.25 times the mass of the Sun and is radiating 61.7 times the Sun's luminosity from its enlarged photosphere at an effective temperature of 4,370 K.
