= 4 Scorpii =

A-type main sequence star in the constellation Scorpius

- Location of 4 Scorpii (circled)

Observation data Epoch J2000.0 Equinox ICRS
- Constellation: Scorpius
- Right ascension: 15^{h} 55^{m} 30.07935^{s}
- Declination: −26° 15′ 57.5781″
- Apparent magnitude (V): +5.625

Characteristics
- Evolutionary stage: main sequence
- Spectral type: A3 V
- B−V color index: 0.141±0.002

Astrometry
Radial velocity (R_{v})	−29.0±1.7 km/s
Proper motion (μ)	RA: −35.80 mas/yr Dec.: −30.09 mas/yr
Parallax (π)	7.99±0.77 mas
Distance	410 ± 40 ly (130 ± 10 pc)
Absolute magnitude (M_{V})	+0.17

Details
Mass	2.1 M_{☉}
Radius	3.9 R_{☉}
Luminosity	67 L_{☉}
Surface gravity (log g)	3.57 cgs
Temperature	8,356 K
Rotational velocity (v sin i)	128 km/s
Age	447 Myr

Other designations
- CD−25°11190, HD 142445, HIP 77984, HR 5917, SAO 183931

Database references
SIMBAD	data

4 Scorpii is a single star in the southern zodiac constellation of Scorpius. With an apparent visual magnitude of +5.6, it is dimly visible to the naked eye under good viewing conditions. The distance to this star can be estimated from its annual parallax shift of 7.99±0.77 mas, which yields a value of around 410 light years. It is moving closer to the Sun with a heliocentric radial velocity of −29 km/s and will reach perihelion in about two million years at an estimated distance of 280 ly (86 pc).

The stellar classification of 4 Scorpii is A3 V, indicating this is an ordinary A-type main-sequence star. It has 2.1 times the mass of the Sun and is radiating around 67 times the Sun's luminosity from its photosphere at an effective temperature of about 8,356 K.
