= HD 145377 =

Star in the southern constellation Scorpius

Observation data Epoch J2000 Equinox ICRS
- Constellation: Scorpius
- Right ascension: 16^{h} 11^{m} 36.44650^{s}
- Declination: −27° 04′ 41.4341″
- Apparent magnitude (V): 8.10

Characteristics
- Evolutionary stage: main sequence
- Spectral type: G3V
- Apparent magnitude (B): 8.73
- Apparent magnitude (J): 7.014±0.018
- Apparent magnitude (H): 6.797±0.040
- Apparent magnitude (K): 6.706±0.018
- B−V color index: 0.63

Astrometry
Radial velocity (R_{v})	+11.610±0.0011 km/s
Proper motion (μ)	RA: +21.792 mas/yr Dec.: +13.049 mas/yr
Parallax (π)	18.5741±0.0235 mas
Distance	175.6 ± 0.2 ly (53.84 ± 0.07 pc)
Absolute magnitude (M_{V})	4.31

Details
Mass	1.129±0.022 M_{☉}
Radius	1.05±0.02 R_{☉} 1.12±0.03 R_{☉}
Luminosity	1.56±0.17 L_{☉} 1.43±0.04 L_{☉}
Surface gravity (log g)	4.38±0.03 cgs
Temperature	6,046±15 K
Metallicity [Fe/H]	0.12±0.01 dex
Rotation	12 days
Rotational velocity (v sin i)	3.85 km/s
Age	0.857±0.732 Gyr; 2.90±1.20 Gyr

Other designations
- CD−26°11249, HD 145377, HIP 79346, SAO 184208, PPM 265238, GSC 06801-00585, 2MASS J16113644-2704414

Database references
SIMBAD	data
Exoplanet Archive	data

HD 145377 is a star in the southern constellation Scorpius. It has an apparent visual magnitude of 8.10 and can be viewed with a small telescope. The star is located at a distance of 175 light years from the Sun based on parallax, and it is drifting further away with a radial velocity of +11.6. The absolute magnitude of this star is 4.31, indicating it would be visible to the naked eye if it were at a distance of 10 parsecs.

This is an ordinary G-type main-sequence star with a stellar classification of G3V, which indicates it is undergoing core hydrogen fusion. It is 5–12% larger and 13% more massive than the Sun. It may be younger than the Sun, with age estimates in the range of 1–3 billion years. The star is spinning with a projected rotational velocity of 3.85 km/s, giving it a rotation period of ~12 days. The abundance of elements more massive than helium – what astronomers term the star's metallicity – is ~31% higher than in the Sun. The star is radiating around 43% to 56% of the luminosity of the Sun from its photosphere at an effective temperature of 6,046 K.

== Planetary system ==
In October 2008 an extrasolar planet, HD 145377 b, was reported to be orbiting this star. This object was detected using the radial velocity method by search programs conducted using the HARPS spectrograph. It is a super-Jupiter in an eccentric orbit with a period of 104 days.

The HD 145377 planetary system
Companion (in order from star)	Mass	Semimajor axis (AU)	Orbital period (days)	Eccentricity	Inclination (°)	Radius
b	≥5.76±0.1 M_{J}	0.45±0.004	103.95±0.13	0.307±0.017	—	—

== See also ==
- List of extrasolar planets
