= HD 142250 =

Star in the constellation of Scorpius

Observation data Epoch J2000 Equinox ICRS
- Constellation: Scorpius
- Right ascension: 15^{h} 54^{m} 30.109^{s}
- Declination: −27° 20′ 19.09″
- Apparent magnitude (V): 6.1

Characteristics
- Evolutionary stage: main sequence
- Spectral type: B6Vp
- U−B color index: −0.44
- B−V color index: −0.07

Astrometry
Radial velocity (R_{v})	−1.3 km/s
Proper motion (μ)	RA: −13.181 mas/yr Dec.: −25.183 mas/yr
Parallax (π)	6.7131±0.0263 mas
Distance	486 ± 2 ly (149.0 ± 0.6 pc)
Absolute magnitude (M_{V})	−0.1
Absolute bolometric magnitude (M_{bol})	−0.72±0.20

Details
Mass	3.74±0.10 M_{☉}
Radius	2.7 R_{☉}
Luminosity	220^{+38}_{−33} L_{☉}
Surface gravity (log g)	4.32 cgs
Temperature	13,646±94 K
Rotational velocity (v sin i)	34.0±1.3 km/s
Age	11±2 Myr

Other designations
- BD−26 11096, HD 142250, HIP 77900, HR 5910, SAO 183907

Database references
SIMBAD	data

HD 142250 (HR 5910, HIP 77900) is a star in the constellation Scorpius. It has a visual apparent magnitude of 6.1, being visible to the naked eye only in excellent seeing conditions. From parallax measurements, it is located 486 light-years (149 parsecs) away from Earth. This distance, together with the star's proper motion, indicate that HIP 77900 is a member of the Upper Scorpius subgroup of the Scorpius–Centaurus association, the nearest OB association to the Sun. This subgroup is the youngest of the three of the association, with an estimated age of 11 million years.

This is a B-type main-sequence star with a spectral type of B6Vp and a mass estimated at 3.7 times the solar mass. HIP 77900 is a helium-weak chemically peculiar star, and has a magnetic field and a slow rate of rotation, with a projected rotational velocity (v sin i) of 34 km/s. Its photosphere is radiating light with a luminosity 220 times greater the Sun's at an effective temperature of 13,600 K.

== Substellar companion ==
Stars in young stellar associations are frequent targets for direct imaging searches for sub-stellar objects, because these objects lose luminosity with time. A 2013 article, using data from the Pan-STARRS and UKIDSS surveys and follow up observations with the IRTF telescope, presented the discovery of an object of spectral type M9 and effective temperature of 2400 ± 150 K separated from HIP 77900 by 21.8 arcseconds, or more than 3200 ± 300 AU at the system's distance. Its mass, estimated from evolutionary models and assuming an age of 10 million years, is 20^{+7}_{−3} Jupiter masses, so the object is probably a low mass brown dwarf. The physical association between the two bodies has not been confirmed through common proper motion observation, but is considered likely given the proximity of the two objects in the sky and that the probable brown dwarf shows signs of youth.

A 2023 survey, using data from the Gaia spacecraft, refined the parameters of this substellar companion. It was found to have a mass of 21±1 M_{J}, a temperature of 2,507+16
−5 K and to be separated from HIP 77900 by a distance of 3,319±28 AU. It is now included in the NASA Exoplanet Archive since its mass is below their upper mass limit of 30 M_{J}.
