= HD 163145 =

Star in the constellation Scorpius

- Location of HD 163145 (circled in red)

Observation data Epoch J2000 Equinox ICRS
- Constellation: Scorpius
- Right ascension: 17^{h} 56^{m} 47.41221^{s}
- Declination: −44° 20′ 31.9504″
- Apparent magnitude (V): 4.85

Characteristics
- Spectral type: K2 III
- B−V color index: 1.176±0.062

Astrometry
Radial velocity (R_{v})	+35.60±0.45 km/s
Proper motion (μ)	RA: −0.825 mas/yr Dec.: −27.277 mas/yr
Parallax (π)	10.6395±0.2141 mas
Distance	307 ± 6 ly (94 ± 2 pc)
Absolute magnitude (M_{V})	0.12

Details
Mass	1.5 M_{☉}
Radius	20.40+0.41 −0.66 R_{☉}
Luminosity	147.0±3.4 L_{☉}
Surface gravity (log g)	2.17 cgs
Temperature	4,450+74 −46 K
Metallicity [Fe/H]	−0.04 dex

Other designations
- CD−44°12201, FK5 3425, HD 163145, HIP 87846, HR 6675, SAO 228562

Database references
SIMBAD	data

HD 163145 is a single star in the constellation Scorpius, near the southeast constellation border with Corona Australis. It has an orange hue and is faintly visible to the naked eye with an apparent visual magnitude of 4.85. Based on parallax measurements, it is located at a distance of approximately 307 light years from the Sun. The star is drifting further away with a radial velocity of +35.6 km/s, having come to within 49.2 light-years of the Sun some 1.871 million years ago. It has an absolute magnitude of 0.12.

This object is an aging giant star with a stellar classification of K2 III. With the supply of hydrogen exhausted at its core, the star has cooled and expanded off the main sequence. At present it has 20 times the radius of the Sun. The star is radiating 147 times the Sun's luminosity from its swollen photosphere at an effective temperature of 4,450 K.
