= 2 Scorpii =

Star in the constellation Scorpius

- Location of 2 Scorpii (circled in red)

Observation data Epoch J2000 Equinox J2000
- Constellation: Scorpius
- Right ascension: 15^{h} 53^{m} 36.71880^{s}
- Declination: −25° 19′ 37.7087″
- Apparent magnitude (V): 4.69 + 6.98

Characteristics
- Spectral type: B2.5 Vn
- B−V color index: −0.11/+0.07

Astrometry
| Radial velocity (R_{v}) | −9.3±1.6 km/s |
| Proper motion (μ) | RA: −15.12 mas/yr Dec.: −25.18 mas/yr |
| Parallax (π) | 6.49±0.51 mas |
| Distance | 500 ± 40 ly (150 ± 10 pc) |
| Absolute magnitude (M_{V}) | −1.33 |

Details

2 Sco A
| Mass | 6.9±0.1 M_{☉} |
| Luminosity | 457.40 L_{☉} |
| Temperature | 20,350 K |
| Rotational velocity (v sin i) | 320 km/s |
| Age | 30.4±4.6 Myr |

Other designations
- A Sco, 2 Sco, CD−24°12352, HD 142114, HIP 77840, HR 5904, SAO 183896, WDS J15536-2520

Database references
| SIMBAD | data |

2 Scorpii (A Scorpii) is a double star in the southern zodiac constellation of Scorpius. The brighter component has an apparent visual magnitude of 4.69, which is bright enough to be visible to the naked eye, while the fainter star is of magnitude 6.98. The distance to this pair can be estimated from the annual parallax shift of 6.49±0.51 mas, which places it roughly 500 light years away. It has a peculiar velocity of 16.5±2.4 km/s and is moving closer to the Sun with a heliocentric radial velocity of about −9 km/s, which will bring it to a perihelion distance of 450 ly (139 pc) in about 2.9 million years. This is a probable (73% chance) member of the Lower Centaurus–Crux group of the nearby Scorpius–Centaurus association (Sco OB2), or else (27% chance) it is a member of the Gould's Belt.

With high likelihood (>95%), this is a binary star system. As of 2014, the pair had an angular separation of 2.061″±0.001″ along a position angle of 268.28°±0.02°. The brighter member, component A, is a B-type main-sequence star with a stellar classification of B2.5 Vn. The 'n' suffix indicates broad (nebulous) absorption lines due to rapid rotation. It is spinning with a projected rotational velocity of 320 km/s, giving the star an oblate shape with an equatorial bulge that is 15% larger than the polar radius. Roughly 30 million years old, it has an estimated 6.9 times the mass of the Sun and is radiating 457 times the Sun's luminosity from its photosphere at an effective temperature of 20,350 K.
