= HD 145250 =

Star in the constellation Scorpius

Observation data Epoch J2000 Equinox ICRS
- Constellation: Scorpius
- Right ascension: 16^{h} 11^{m} 02.06830^{s}
- Declination: −29° 24′ 58.3873″
- Apparent magnitude (V): 5.13

Characteristics
- Evolutionary stage: Red-giant branch
- Spectral type: K0 III
- U−B color index: 1.02
- B−V color index: 1.12

Astrometry
Radial velocity (R_{v})	−26.46±0.12 km/s
Proper motion (μ)	RA: −88.148 mas/yr Dec.: −87.568 mas/yr
Parallax (π)	11.5124±0.0934 mas
Distance	283 ± 2 ly (86.9 ± 0.7 pc)
Absolute magnitude (M_{V})	+0.15

Details
Mass	1.38±0.09 M_{☉}
Radius	16.5±2.7 R_{☉}
Luminosity	86.2±2.1 L_{☉}
Surface gravity (log g)	2.74±0.10 cgs
Temperature	4,540±50 K
Metallicity [Fe/H]	−0.36±0.05 dex

Other designations
- CD−29°12343, HD 145250, HIP 79302, HR 6017, TYC 6792-2274-1, IRC −30256

Database references
SIMBAD	data

HD 145250 is a star in the constellation of Scorpius. At an apparent magnitude of +5.13, it is faintly visible to the naked eye in locations far from light pollution. Parallax measurements give a distance of 283 light-years. The star is inside the Upper Scorpius subgroup of the Scorpius–Centaurus association, but is not a member.

The spectrum of this star matches a spectral class of K0 III, with the luminosity class III indicating it is a giant star that has exhausted the hydrogen at its core. It is currently fusing hydrogen in a shell around the core, being in the evolutionary stage known as the red-giant branch. HD 145250 displays photometric variability caused by seismic oscillations, and has been studied using asteroseismology to determine its physical properties. The star has a mass 1.38 times the mass of the Sun and has expanded to 16 times the Sun's radius. It now radiates 86 times the Sun's luminosity from its photosphere at an effective temperature of 4,540 K. This temperature give it the orangish hue typical of a K-type star.

While no companion star has been detected, its proper motions derived by the Hipparcos and Gaia satellites are slightly different, suggesting it may be an astrometric binary with a low-mass companion.
