= HR 5907 =

Star in the constellation Scorpius

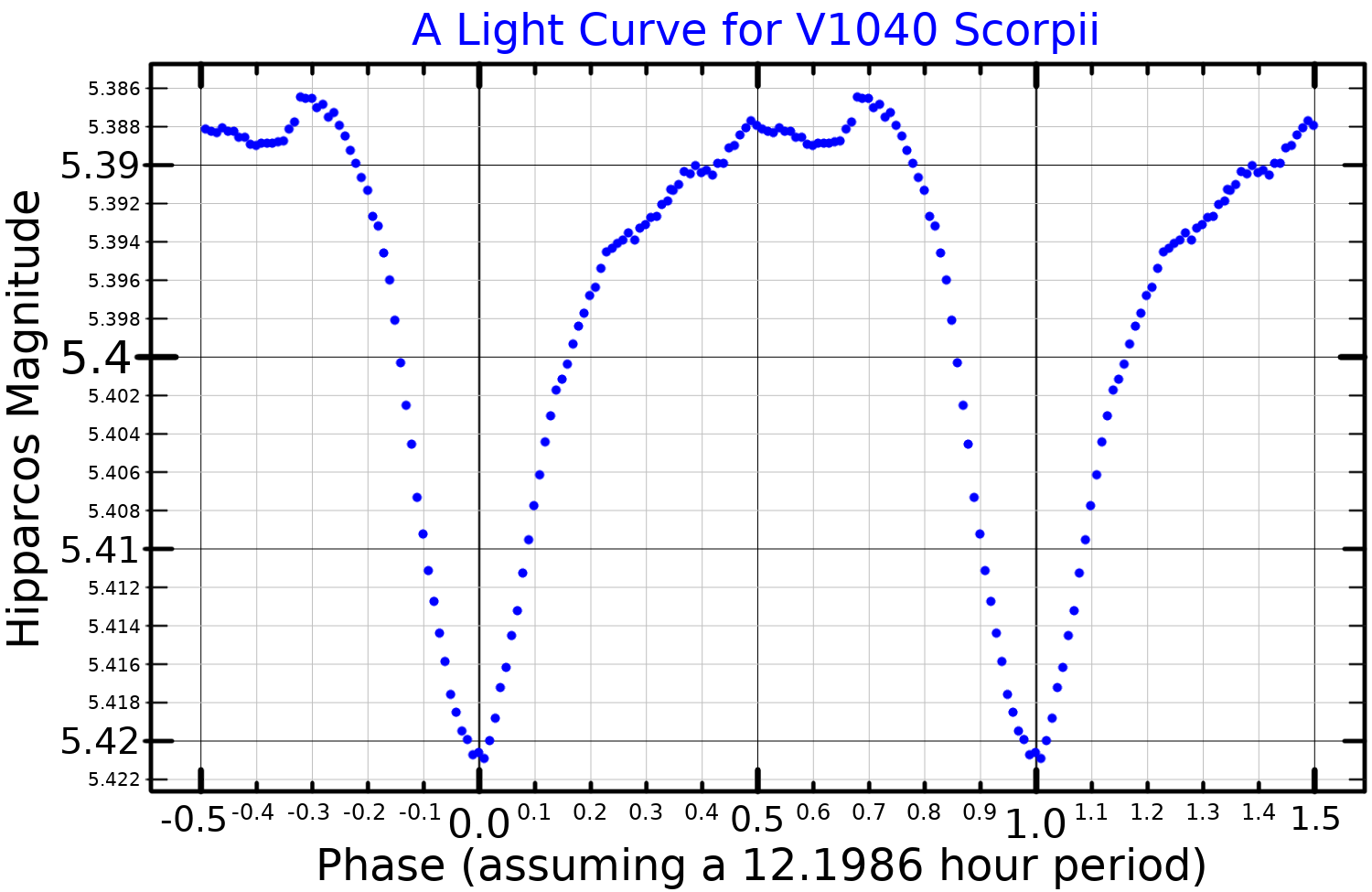
- A light curve for V1040 Scorpii, adapted from Grunhut et al. (2012). The data is from MOST but has been shifted to match the Hipparcos magnitude scale.

Observation data Epoch J2000.0 Equinox J2000.0
- Constellation: Scorpius
- Right ascension: 15^{h} 53^{m} 55.86379^{s}
- Declination: −23° 58′ 41.1434″
- Apparent magnitude (V): 5.39 - 5.43

Characteristics
- Evolutionary stage: main sequence
- Spectral type: B2.5V
- Variable type: SX Ari

Astrometry
Proper motion (μ)	RA: −13.406±0.083 mas/yr Dec.: −24.111±0.064 mas/yr
Parallax (π)	6.9899±0.0739 mas
Distance	467 ± 5 ly (143 ± 2 pc)
Absolute magnitude (M_{V})	−0.17

Details
Mass	5.5±0.5 M_{☉}
Radius	3.1±0.2 (equatorial) R_{☉}
Luminosity	600+230 −170 L_{☉}
Surface gravity (log g)	4.200±0.053 cgs
Temperature	17000±1000 K
Rotation	0.508276+0.000015 −0.000012 d
Rotational velocity (v sin i)	340±18 km/s
Age	206 Myr

Other designations
- V1040 Sco, HD 142184, HIP 77859, SAO 183901

Database references
SIMBAD	data

HR 5907, also known as V1040 Scorpii and HD 142184, is a star about 470 light years from the Earth, in the constellation Scorpius. It is a 5th magnitude star, so it will be faintly visible to the naked eye of an observer far from city lights. Its brightness varies slightly, ranging from magnitude 5.39 to 5.43 every 12 hours and 20 minutes. HR 5907 is a member of the Scorpius–Centaurus association.

Spectroscopic observations by William Buscombe and Pamela Morris during the years 1956 through 1959 showed that the radial velocity of HR 5907 varied by about 50 km/sec. In 1966, Graham Hill first detected brightness variations in HD 5907. He determined that the brightness varied by 0.03 magnitudes, but was unable to classify the star's type of variability. In 1998, Anne Marie Hubert and Michele Floquet examined the Hipparcos data for the star, confirmed that its brightness varies, and derived a period of 0.508 days with no indications of long-term variability. In 1996 HR 5907 was given the variable star designation V1040 Scorpii.

As of 2018, HR 5907 was the most luminous early spectral type star known at centimeter and millimeter radio wavelengths. On the other end of the electromagnetic spectrum, in 2012 it was clearly detected by the Chandra X-ray Observatory.

HR 5907 is a main sequence star with a strong magnetic field. As of 2018, it had the shortest rotation period known of any early spectral type magnetic star. It spins so rapidly that the star's polar radius is only 88% as large as the equatorial radius. The star has a dipole magnetic field strength of at least 10 kilogauss.
