= V861 Scorpii =

Variable Star in the constellation Scorpius

- Location of V861 Scorpii (circled in red)

Observation data Epoch J2000.0 Equinox ICRS
- Constellation: Scorpius
- Right ascension: 16^{h} 56^{m} 35.98^{s}
- Declination: −40° 49′ 24.4″
- Apparent magnitude (V): 6.07 (- 5.28) - 6.40

Characteristics
- Evolutionary stage: Blue supergiant
- Spectral type: B2Iab/b (B0 Iae + B2V)‍
- Variable type: EB

Astrometry
Radial velocity (R_{v})	−40.6 km/s
Proper motion (μ)	RA: −0.162 mas/yr Dec.: −1.398 mas/yr
Parallax (π)	0.6577±0.0333 mas
Distance	5,000 ± 300 ly (1,520 ± 80 pc)

Orbit
Period (P)	7.84826 days
Eccentricity (e)	0.163±0.024
Periastron epoch (T)	JD 2443734.35±0.16
Argument of periastron (ω) (secondary)	35.9±7.6°
Semi-amplitude (K_{1}) (primary)	79.2±2.0 km/s

Details

A
Mass	40-60 M_{☉}

B
Mass	12.5±2 M_{☉}

Other designations
- Hen 3-1291, MCW 1269, OAO 1653-40, V861 Scorpii, CD+40°10975, HD 152667, HIP 82911, HR 6283, SAO 227473, TIC 341512659, 2MASS J16563597−4049244

Database references
SIMBAD	data

V861 Scorpii (also known as HD 152667, or V861 Sco) is a blue supergiant star and eclipsing binary system located in the constellation of Scorpius, within the open cluster Trumpler 24. Classified as a Beta Lyrae-type variable star, it exhibits both spectroscopic and photometric variability with an orbital period of approximately 7.848 days. Its visual magnitude ranges from 6.07 to 6.40, making it faintly visible to the naked eye under optimal conditions.

== Charecterstics ==
V861 Scorpii is a massive binary system with a primary star classified as a blue supergiant of spectral type B0.5Iae or B2Iab/b, indicating a hot, luminous star with emission lines. The system is located at a distance of approximately 5,000 light-years (1,520 parsecs) from Earth, based on Gaia DR3 parallax measurements of 0.6577±0.0333 milliarcseconds.

== Binary System ==
V861 Scorpii is a spectroscopic binary with an orbital period of 7.848 days. The primary is a blue supergiant, while the nature of the secondary component remains less certain. Early studies suggested a possible compact companion, such as a black hole, due to its tentative association with the X-ray source OAO 1653-40. However, subsequent observations indicate that the X-ray emission is variable but consistent with a normal supergiant spectrum, and the association with a compact object is unconfirmed, with later evidence suggesting the X-ray source may be unrelated.

== Observations ==
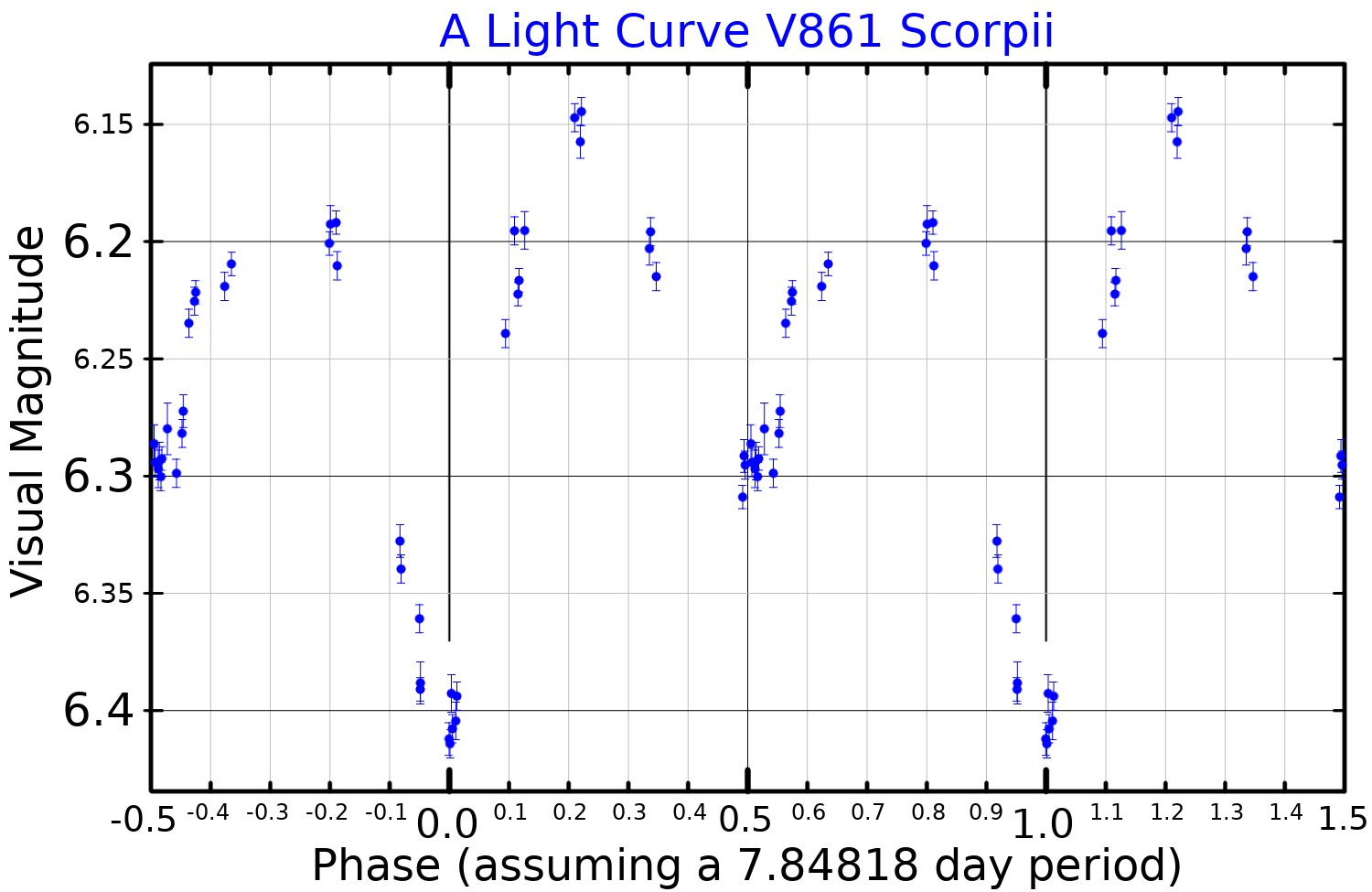
A visual band light curve for V861 Scorpii, plotted from Hipparcos data

V861 Scorpii has been studied extensively for its photometric and spectroscopic variability. Observations from 1977–1980 revealed potential short-period variations in radial velocity, suggesting complex orbital dynamics. The star's light curves and stellar wind properties have been analyzed, showing no significant phase-dependent variations in infrared or ultraviolet observations. Its membership in the Trumpler 24 cluster has aided in determining its distance and evolutionary context.
