= RY Scuti =

Eclipsing binary in Scutum

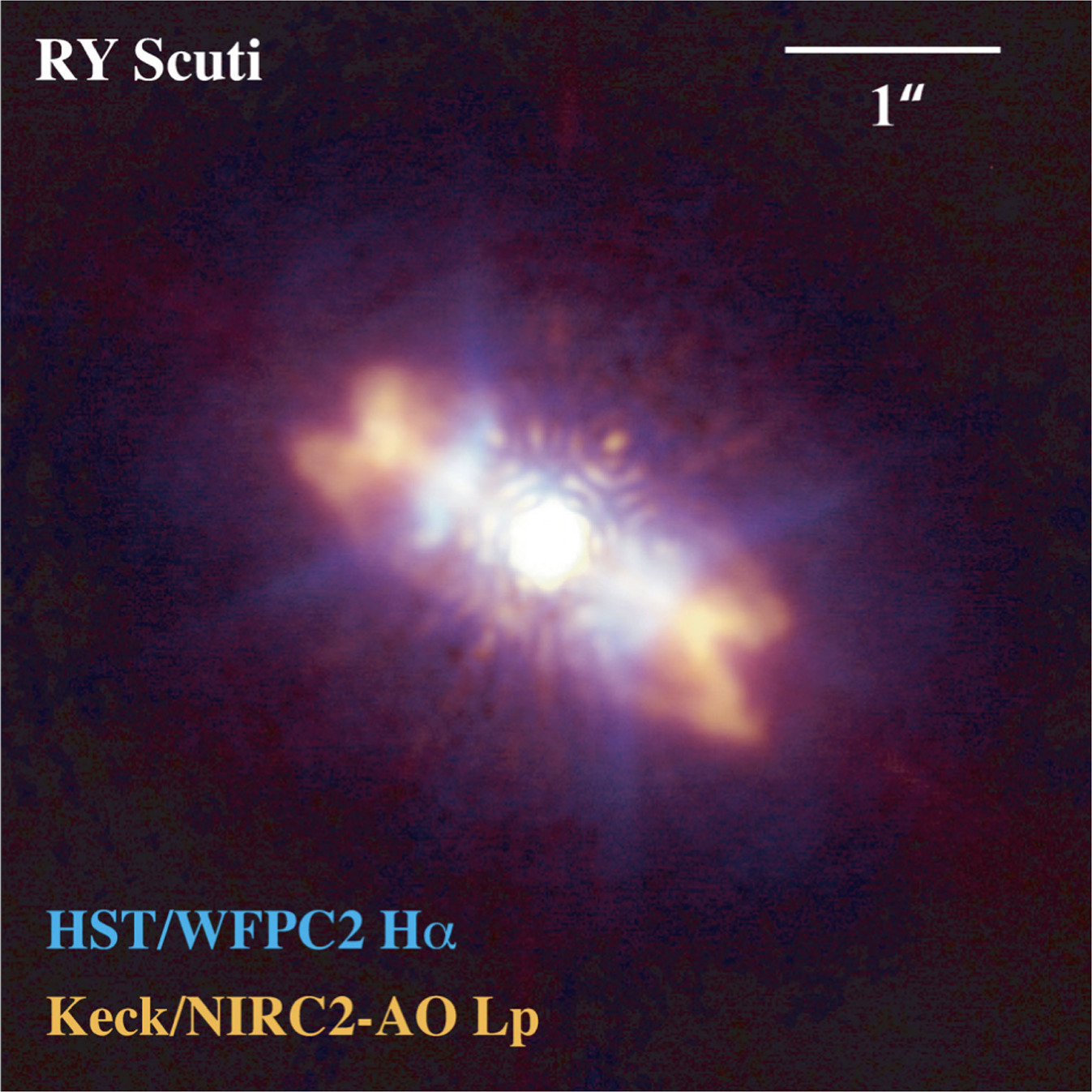
- Image of RY Scuti's surrounding dusty (orange) and ionised (blue) tori.

Observation data Epoch J2000 Equinox ICRS
- Constellation: Scutum
- Right ascension: 18^{h} 25^{m} 31.48^{s}
- Declination: −12° 41′ 24.2″
- Apparent magnitude (V): 9.12 – 9.72

Characteristics
- Apparent magnitude (U): 10.25
- Apparent magnitude (B): 10.38±0.99
- Apparent magnitude (G): 8.63±0.01
- Apparent magnitude (R): 9.46±0.04
- Apparent magnitude (J): 6.25±0.02
- Apparent magnitude (H): 5.85±0.02
- Apparent magnitude (K): 5.46±0.02
- Variable type: β Lyr

Massive Component
- Spectral type: O7

Supergiant
- Evolutionary stage: Blue supergiant
- Spectral type: O9.7 Ibpe

Astrometry
| Proper motion (μ) | RA: −0.333±0.023 mas/yr Dec.: −2.026±0.018 mas/yr |
| Parallax (π) | 0.4748±0.0220 mas |
| Distance | 1800±100 pc |

Massive Component
| Absolute bolometric magnitude (M_{bol}) | −8.3±0.1 |

Supergiant
| Absolute bolometric magnitude (M_{bol}) | −8.7±0.1 |

Orbit
| Period (P) | 11.125 d |
| Semi-major axis (a) | 69.9±2.3″ |
| Eccentricity (e) | ~0 |
| Inclination (i) | 82.4±0.3° |
| Semi-amplitude (K_{1}) (primary) | 59±9 km/s |
| Semi-amplitude (K_{2}) (secondary) | 249±3 km/s |

Details
| Metallicity [Fe/H] | −2.23±0.03 dex |

Massive Component
| Mass | 30.0±2.1 M_{☉} |
| Radius | 9.7±0.2 R_{☉} |
| Luminosity | 160000+20000 −10000 L_{☉} |
| Surface gravity (log g) | 3.94±0.03 cgs |
| Temperature | 37000+2000 −1000 K |
| Rotational velocity (v sin i) | 194±18 km/s |

Supergiant
| Mass | 7.1±1.2 M_{☉} |
| Radius | 18.4±0.3 R_{☉} |
| Luminosity | 240000+20000 −20000 L_{☉} |
| Surface gravity (log g) | 2.76±0.02 cgs |
| Temperature | 30000+1000 −1000 K |
| Rotational velocity (v sin i) | 80±3 km/s |

Other designations
- RY Sct, HD 169515, ALS 5024, ALS 9603, AN 34.1908, BD-12 5045, CMC 207024, CMC 161458, GCRV 10896, GEN# +1.00169515, GSC 05698-02356, Hen 3-1694, HIP 90303, HIC 90303, IRAS 18227-1243, JP11 2974, LS IV -12 54, LS 5024, MCW 684, PPM 234519, RAFGL 5235S, SAO 161458, SBC7 679, SBC9 1049, HV 3076, TYC 5698-2356-1, UBV M 22925, UCAC2 27342864, UCAC4 387-094010, uvby98 100169515, WEB 15453, YZC 11 6294

Database references
| SIMBAD | data |

RY Scuti is an eclipsing binary in the constellation of Scutum. It consists of a massive central star with an accretion disc and a blue supergiant donor. It is surrounded by a dusty and an ionised torus.

== Observational history ==
RY Scuti was first observed between 1886 at Bonn Observatory in the Southern Durchmusterung with the designation BD-12 5045. It was initially classified as a B[e] star in 1925. It was later added to the General Catalogue of Variable Stars between 1948 and 1952, where it was designated RY Scuti.

== Star system ==
=== Massive component ===
The central star is surrounded by a hot, optically thick accretion disc created due to roche lobe overflow (RLOF) from the orbiting supergiant. Once it has stopped accreting, the surrounding disc might become optically thin, making it more visible.

==== Spectral classification ====
Due to its shallow Si_{III}, O_{II} and N_{II} lines, it was initially estimated to have a spectral type of B2 and later as B0.5 I due to its absorption spectrum's similarity with that of HD 185859. However, the luminosity-sensitive lines present are much stronger than what is typically observed, indicating that they originate from low-density plasma and therefore most likely apply to the surrounding accretion disc rather than the star itself. Instead, the star is more likely to be of spectral type O7 due to its high effective temperature.

=== Supergiant ===
The supergiant component is less massive but more luminous and larger than the central star. Its high abundance in neon, sulphur and iron indicates that large portions of its outer envelope have been stripped away due to RLOF, leaving hydrogen-poor material exposed.

=== Supernova ===
Once the massive component has accreted all the material gained from RLOF, it is expected to become a B[e] supergiant. If it has accreted the entire outer envelope of its companion, the supergiant is expected to explode in a type Ib/c supernova or otherwise as a type IIb supernova.

== Nebula ==
RY Scuti is surrounded by a nebula which consists of a dusty and an ionised torus. The ionised torus is likely driven by episodic ejections and is expanding nonuniformly at a mean rate of 10 mas yr^{-1}, indicating that the ejection that caused it took place between 1877 and 1885. Evidence of photometric variability during the time period indicates that one or both of the components in the system underwent an outburst similar to S Doradus. The rate of expansion of the dusty torus indicates that it formed between 1718 and 1790. They are likely to have been shaped by the massive component's accretion disc as they are clearly separated, which likely means that they are not hydrodynamically interacting, which would mean that a former large disc couldn't have shaped them.
