= NGC 3642 =

Galaxy in the constellation Ursa Major

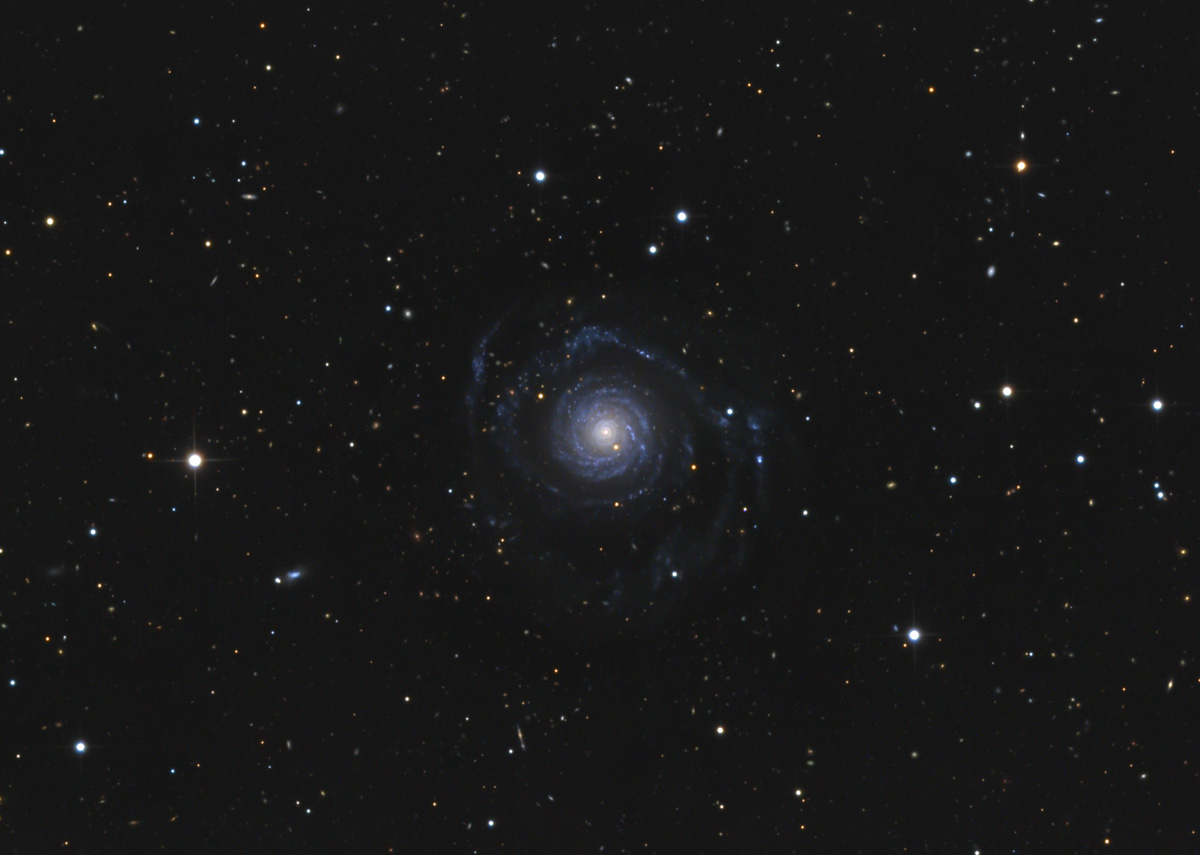
- NGC 3642 as taken by Mount Lemmon SkyCenter

Observation data (J2000 epoch)
- Constellation: Ursa Major
- Right ascension: 11^{h} 22^{m} 17.9^{s}
- Declination: 59° 04′ 28″
- Redshift: 1571 ± 3 km/s
- Distance: 27 ± 35 Mly (8.4 ± 10.7 Mpc)
- Apparent magnitude (V): 10.8

Characteristics
- Type: SA(r)bc
- Apparent size (V): 1.8′ × 1.5′

Other designations
- UGC 6385, MCG +10-16-128, PGC 34889

NGC 3642 is a spiral galaxy in the constellation Ursa Major. The galaxy has a low-ionization nuclear emission-line region. It is located at a distance of circa 30 million light years from Earth, which, given its apparent dimensions, means that NGC 3642 is about 50,000 light years across. The galaxy is characterised by an outer pseudoring, which was probably formed after the accretion of a gas rich dwarf galaxy.

== Structure ==
NGC 3642 is a spiral galaxy without a bar. In the nucleus there is a supermassive black hole with an estimated mass of 26-31 million M⊙, based on the intrinsic velocity dispersion as measured by the Hubble Space Telescope, or 15 million M⊙, based on the bulge luminosities in near-infrared Ks-band.

Around the nucleus, a one-armed spiral forms a ring, and it is possible that it leads material towards the nucleus. The nucleus is surrounded by an inner flocculent spiral. The outer part of the spiral forms a pseudoring that extends for about half a circle. The outer part of the spiral is warped, while its main part features an ordinary differentially rotating disk. The HI gas is also warped and extends further on the western side.

== Nearby galaxies ==
The galaxy belongs to the NGC 3642 group (also known as the NGC 3610 group), a galaxy group that also includes NGC 3610, NGC 3619, NGC 3669, NGC 3674 and NGC 3683. Other nearby galaxies include NGC 3440, NGC 3445, NGC 3458, NGC 3543 and NGC 3613.

== Gallery ==
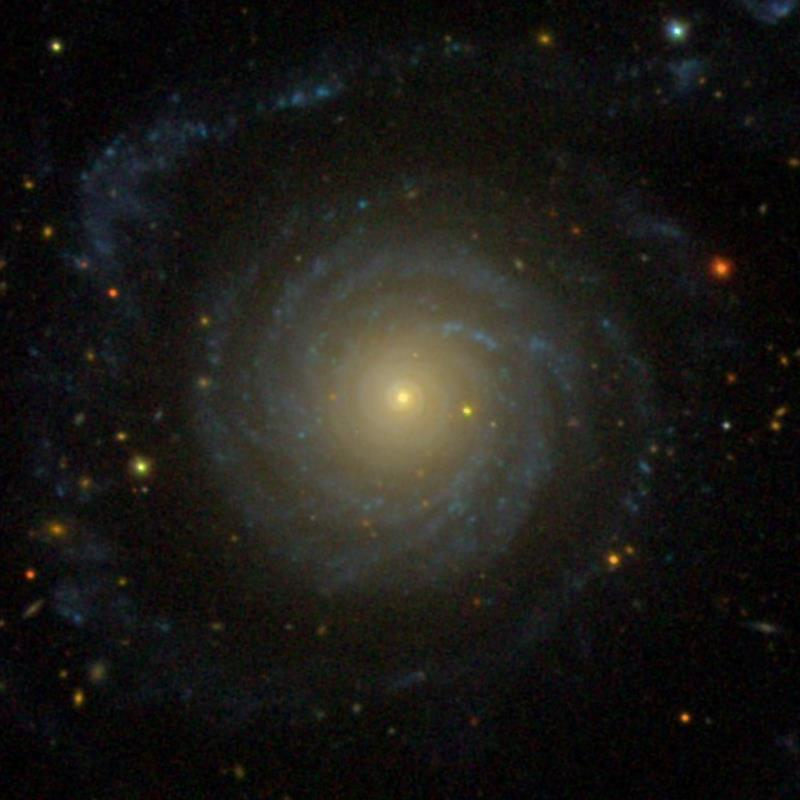
NGC 3642 (SDSS DR14)

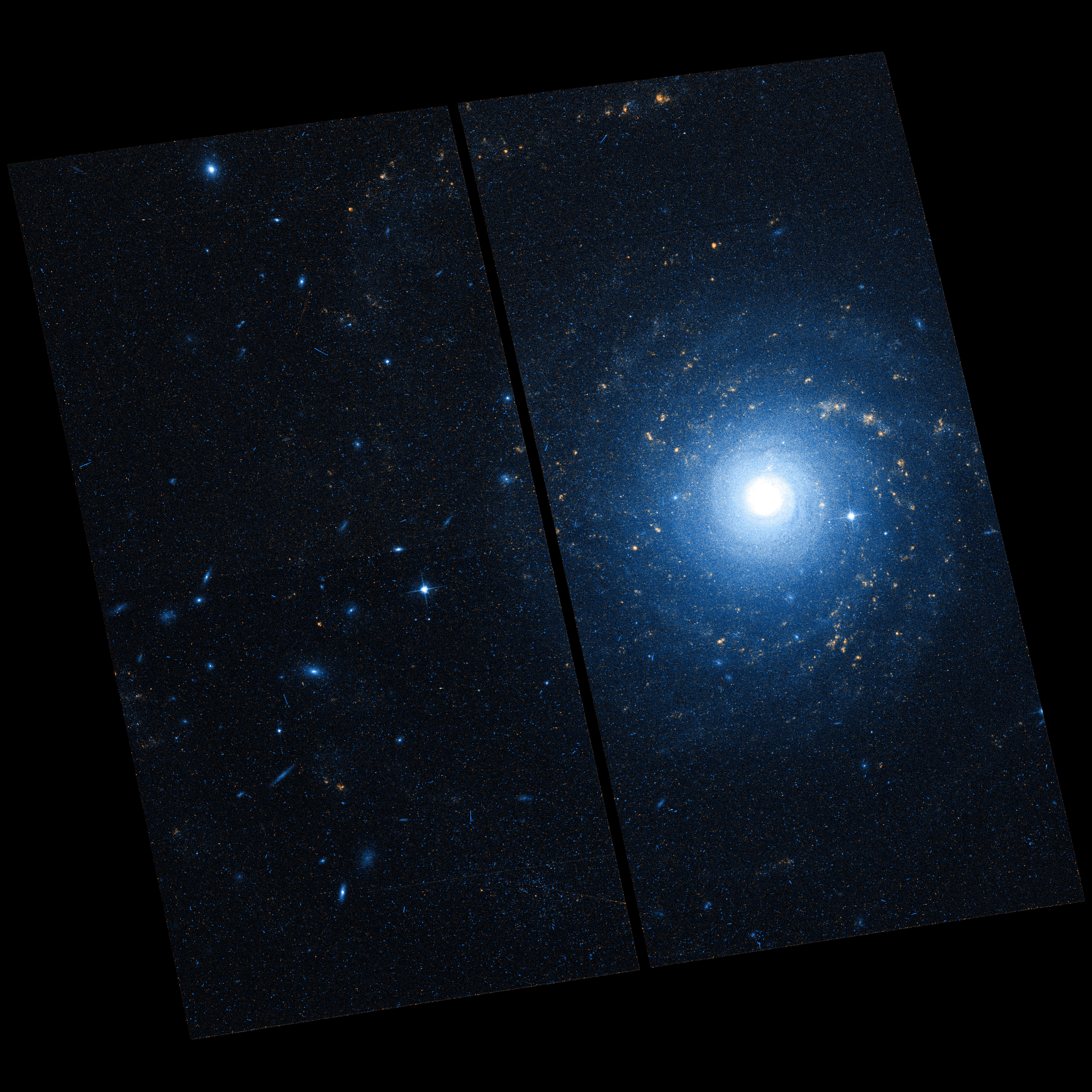
NGC 3642 (Hubble Space Telescope)

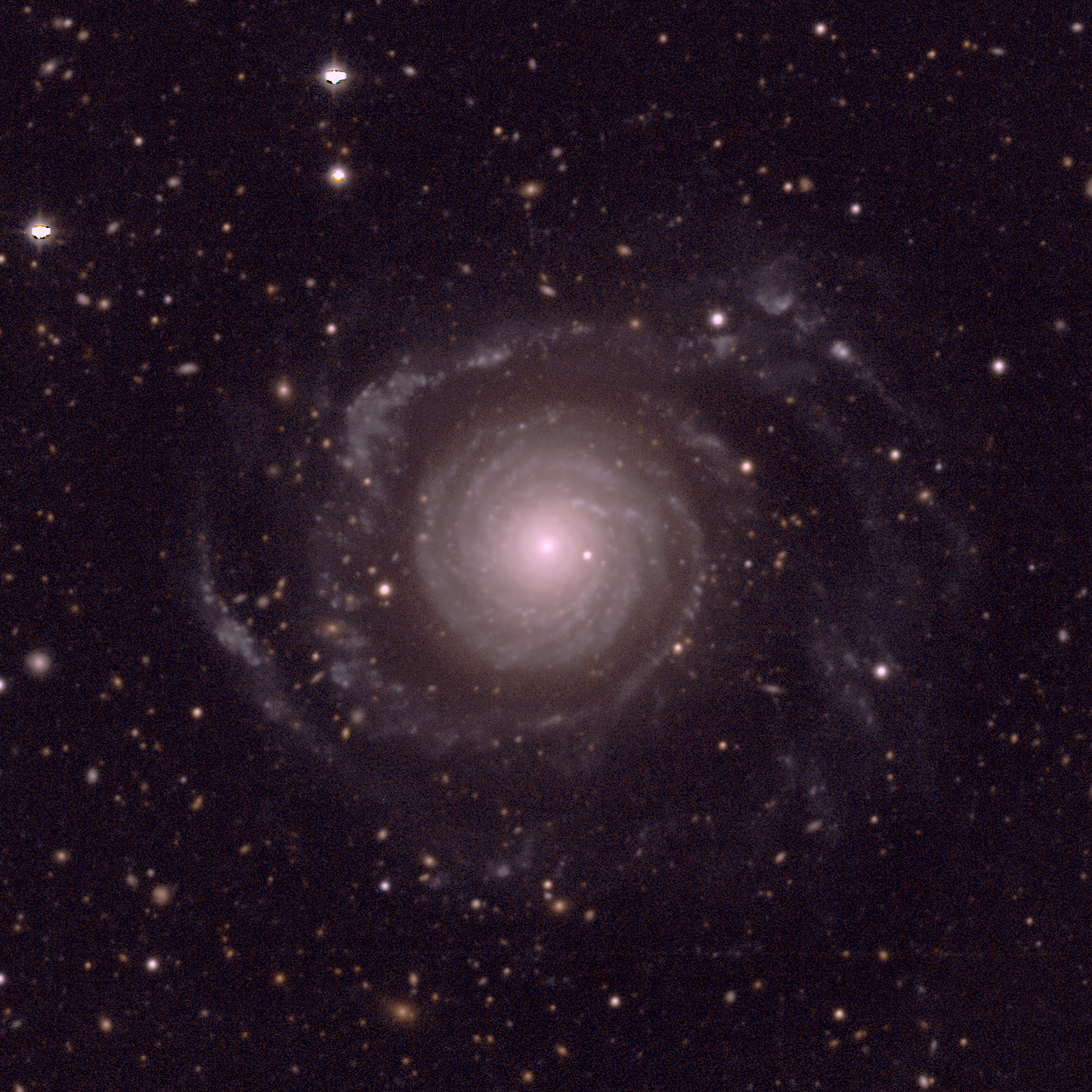
NGC 3642 with legacy surveys
