= Galaxy formation and evolution =

Subfield of cosmology

In cosmology, the study of galaxy formation and evolution is concerned with the processes that formed a heterogeneous universe from a homogeneous beginning, the formation of the first galaxies, the way galaxies change over time, and the processes that have generated the variety of structures observed in nearby galaxies. Galaxy formation is hypothesized to occur from structure formation theories, as a result of tiny quantum fluctuations in the aftermath of the Big Bang. The simplest model in general agreement with observed phenomena is the Lambda-CDM model—that is, clustering and merging allows galaxies to accumulate mass, determining both their shape and structure. Hydrodynamics simulation, which simulates both baryons and dark matter, is widely used to study galaxy formation and evolution.

== Commonly observed properties of galaxies ==
Hubble tuning fork diagram of galaxy morphology

Because of the inability to conduct experiments in outer space, the only way to "test" theories and models of galaxy evolution is to compare them with observations. Explanations for how galaxies formed and evolved must be able to predict the observed properties and types of galaxies.

The galaxy classification scheme commonly known as the Tuning-Fork diagram has roots in work by James Jeans and John Henry Reynolds. Jeans (1919) and Reynolds (1920) established the E–S0–S morphological sequence. Edwin Hubble (1926) subsequently popularised and extended this framework, bifurcating the spiral branch to distinguish barred from unbarred spirals. Jeans (1928) then produced the Y-shaped diagram that encapsulated this sequence in visual form, later turned sideways to become the tuning fork. It partitioned galaxies into ellipticals, lenticulars, normal spirals, barred spirals (such as the Milky Way), and irregulars.

While the Tuning Fork remains a widely used descriptive tool, it does not encode evolutionary pathways between galaxy types – it is a morphological classification, not an evolutionary schema. A more recent framework called the Triangal, introduced by Alister W. Graham, explicitly maps evolutionary channels between galaxy species. Unlike the Tuning Fork, the Triangal distinguishes three physically distinct origins for lenticular (S0) galaxies: (i) primeval systems that have never been through a major merger; (ii) faded spiral galaxies that have exhausted their gas supply; and (iii) dust-rich S0 galaxies assembled through wet (gas-rich) major mergers, constituting a "green mountain" population. The framework further identifies a 'Disc Down-sizing' sequence in which successive dry (gas-poor) mergers progressively erase stellar discs, transitioning galaxies from ES (ellicular) types through to pure ellipticals with depleted cores. By treating galaxy morphology as a record of accretion and merger history rather than a static label, the Triangal provides a physically motivated reference frame for interpreting galaxy scaling relations and black hole–galaxy coevolution.

These galaxy types exhibit the following properties which can be explained by current galaxy evolution theories:

- Many of the properties of galaxies (including the galaxy color–magnitude diagram) indicate that there are fundamentally two types of galaxies. These groups divide into blue star-forming galaxies that are more like spiral types, and red non-star forming galaxies that are more like elliptical galaxies.
- Spiral galaxies are quite thin, dense, and rotate relatively fast, while the stars in elliptical galaxies have randomly oriented orbits.
- The majority of giant galaxies contain a supermassive black hole in their centers, ranging in mass from millions to billions of times the mass of the Sun. The black hole mass is tied to the host galaxy bulge or spheroid mass. It is now recognized that the black hole mass scaling relation is specific to the galaxy's morphology, which serves as a signature of the galaxy's distinct formation and assembly history. Furthermore, in fainter, lower-mass galaxies, a central nuclear star cluster frequently co-exists with the supermassive black hole, and a mathematical mass scaling relation exists between these two central massive objects.
- Metallicity has a positive correlation with the luminosity of a galaxy and an even stronger correlation with galaxy mass.

Astronomers now believe that disk galaxies likely formed first, then evolved into elliptical galaxies through galaxy mergers.

Current models also predict that the majority of mass in galaxies is made up of dark matter, a substance which is not directly observable, and might not interact through any means except gravity. This observation arises because galaxies could not have formed as they have, or rotate as they are seen to, unless they contain far more mass than can be directly observed.

== Formation of disk galaxies ==
The earliest stage in the evolution of galaxies is their formation. When a galaxy forms, it has a disk shape and is called a spiral galaxy due to spiral-like "arm" structures located on the disk. There are different theories on how these disk-like distributions of stars develop from a cloud of matter: however, at present, none of them exactly predicts the results of observation.

=== Top-down theories ===
Olin J. Eggen, Donald Lynden-Bell, and Allan Sandage in 1962, proposed a theory that disk galaxies form through a monolithic collapse of a large gas cloud. The distribution of matter in the early universe was in clumps that consisted mostly of dark matter. These clumps interacted gravitationally, putting tidal torques on each other that acted to give them some angular momentum. As the baryonic matter cooled, it dissipated some energy and contracted toward the center. With angular momentum conserved, the matter near the center speeds up its rotation. Then, like a spinning ball of pizza dough, the matter forms into a tight disk. Once the disk cools, the gas is not gravitationally stable, so it cannot remain a singular homogeneous cloud. It breaks, and these smaller clouds of gas form stars. Since the dark matter does not dissipate as it only interacts gravitationally, it remains distributed outside the disk in what is known as the dark halo. Observations show that there are stars located outside the disk, which does not quite fit the "pizza dough" model. It was first proposed by Leonard Searle and Robert Zinn that galaxies form by the coalescence of smaller progenitors. Known as a top-down formation scenario, this theory is quite simple yet no longer widely accepted.

=== Bottom-up theory ===
More recent theories include the clustering of dark matter halos in the bottom-up process. Instead of large gas clouds collapsing to form a galaxy in which the gas breaks up into smaller clouds, it is proposed that matter started out in these "smaller" clumps (mass on the order of globular clusters), and then many of these clumps merged to form galaxies, which then were drawn by gravitation to form galaxy clusters. This still results in disk-like distributions of baryonic matter with dark matter forming the halo for all the same reasons as in the top-down theory. Models using this sort of process predict more small galaxies than large ones, which matches observations.

Astronomers do not currently know what process stops the contraction. In fact, theories of disk galaxy formation are not successful at producing the rotation speed and size of disk galaxies. It has been suggested that the radiation from bright newly formed stars, or from an active galactic nucleus can slow the contraction of a forming disk. It has also been suggested that the dark matter halo can pull the galaxy, thus stopping disk contraction.

The Lambda-CDM model is a cosmological model that explains the formation of the universe after the Big Bang. It is a relatively simple model that predicts many properties observed in the universe, including the relative frequency of different galaxy types; however, it underestimates the number of thin disk galaxies in the universe. The reason is that these galaxy formation models predict a large number of mergers. If disk galaxies merge with another galaxy of comparable mass (at least 15 percent of its mass) the merger will likely destroy, or at a minimum greatly disrupt the disk, and the resulting galaxy is not expected to be a disk galaxy (see next section). While this remains an unsolved problem for astronomers, it does not necessarily mean that the Lambda-CDM model is completely wrong, but rather that it requires further refinement to accurately reproduce the population of galaxies in the universe.

== Galaxy mergers and the formation of elliptical galaxies ==
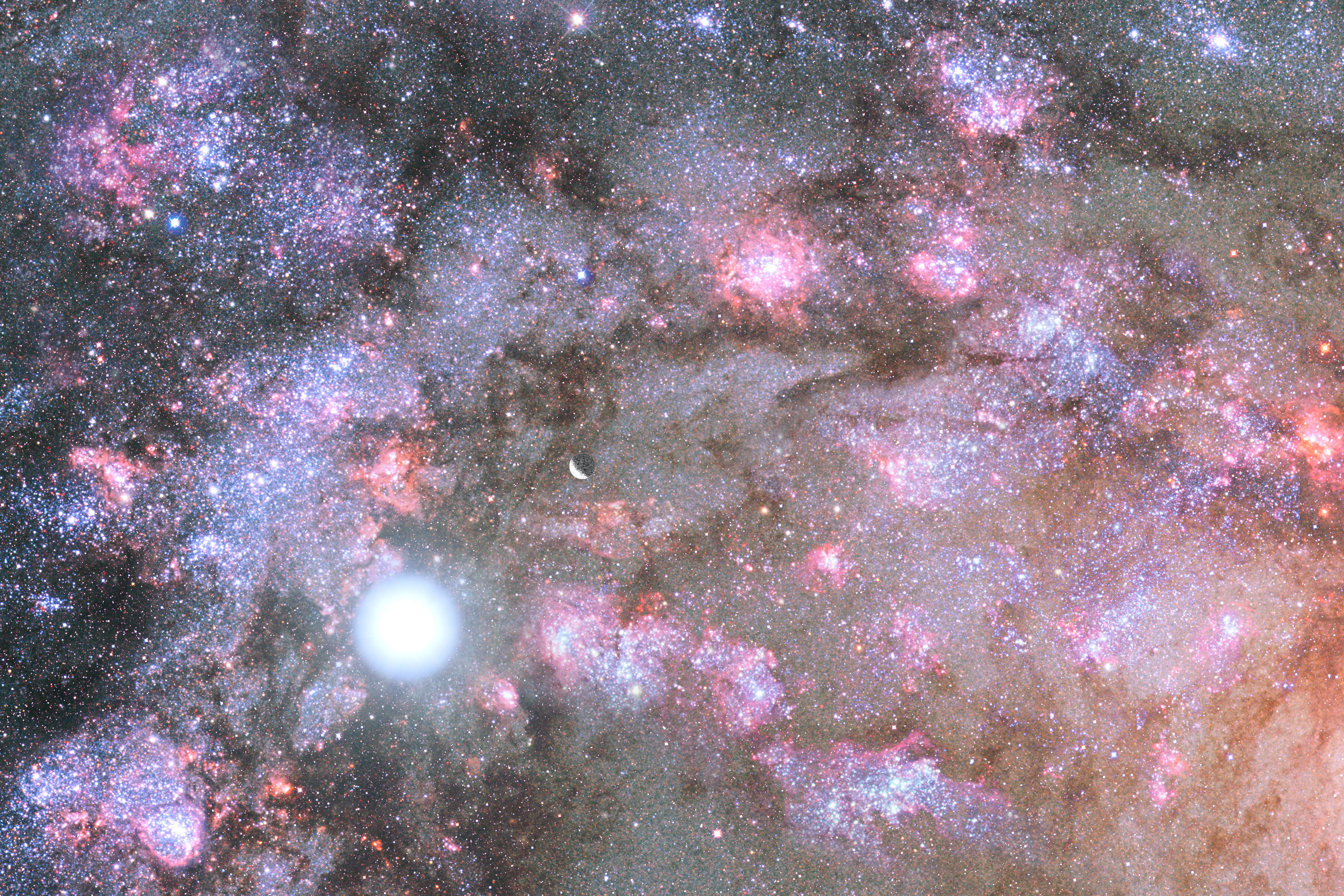
Artist's image of a firestorm of star birth deep inside the core of a young, growing elliptical galaxy

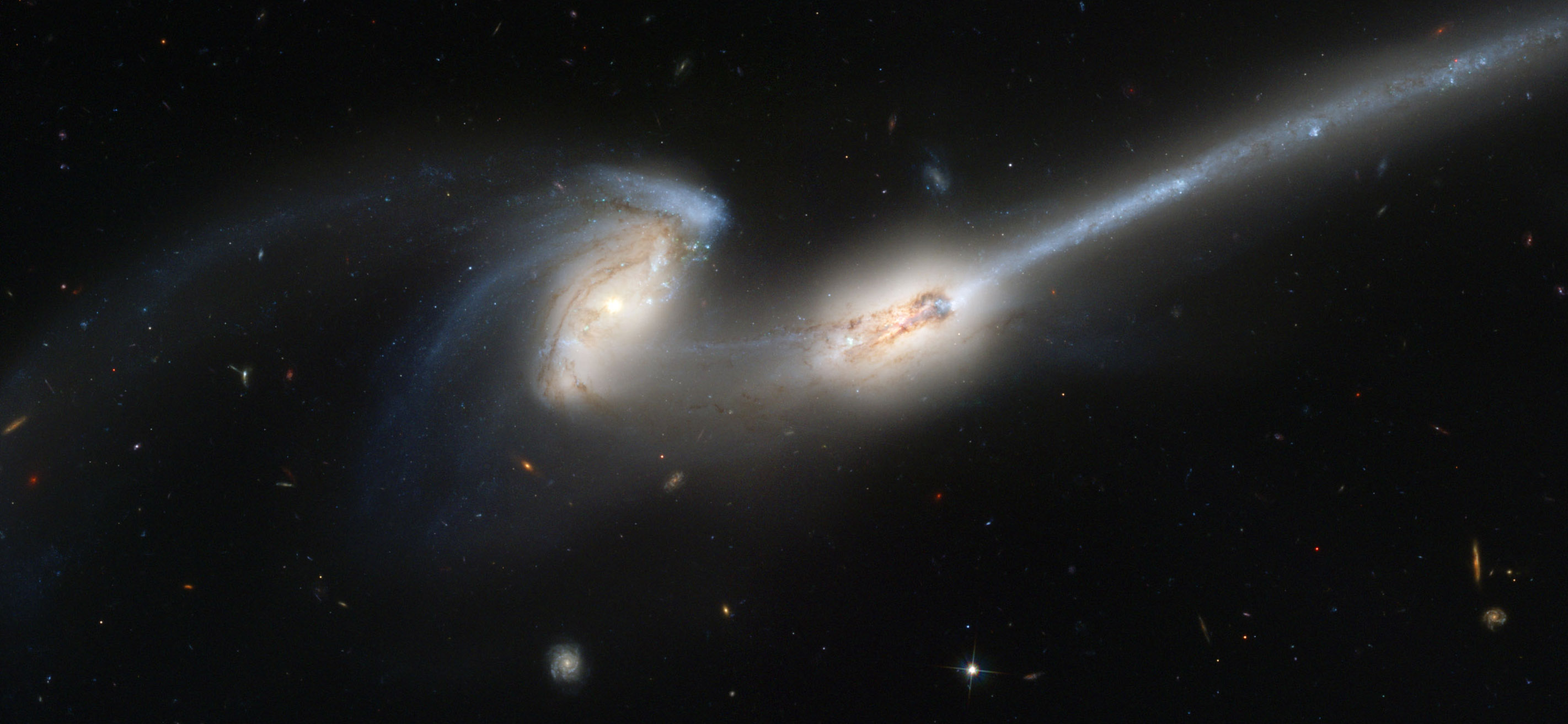
NGC 4676 (Mice Galaxies) is an example of a present merger.

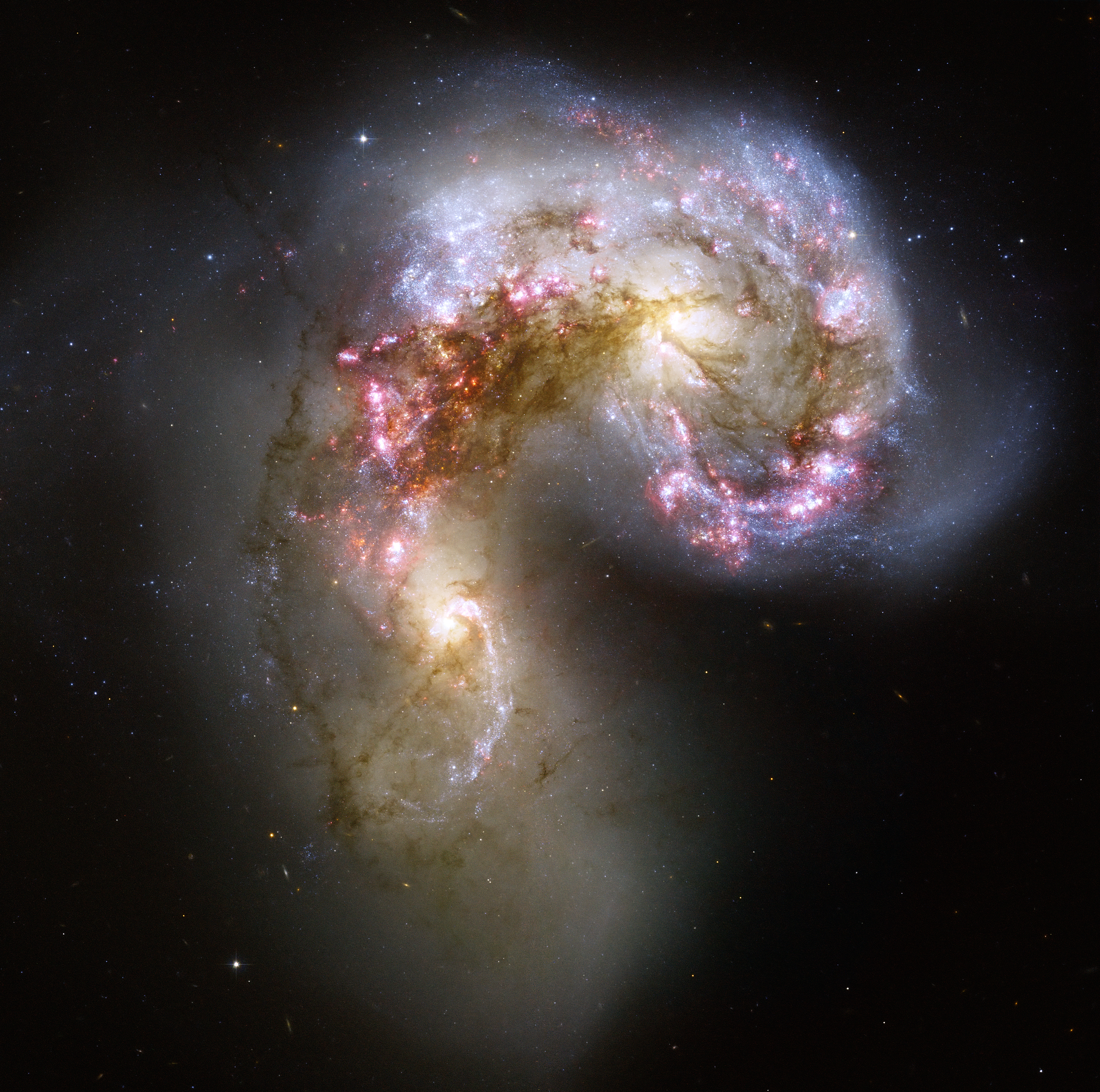
The Antennae Galaxies are a pair of colliding galaxies – the bright, blue knots are young stars that have recently ignited as a result of the merger.

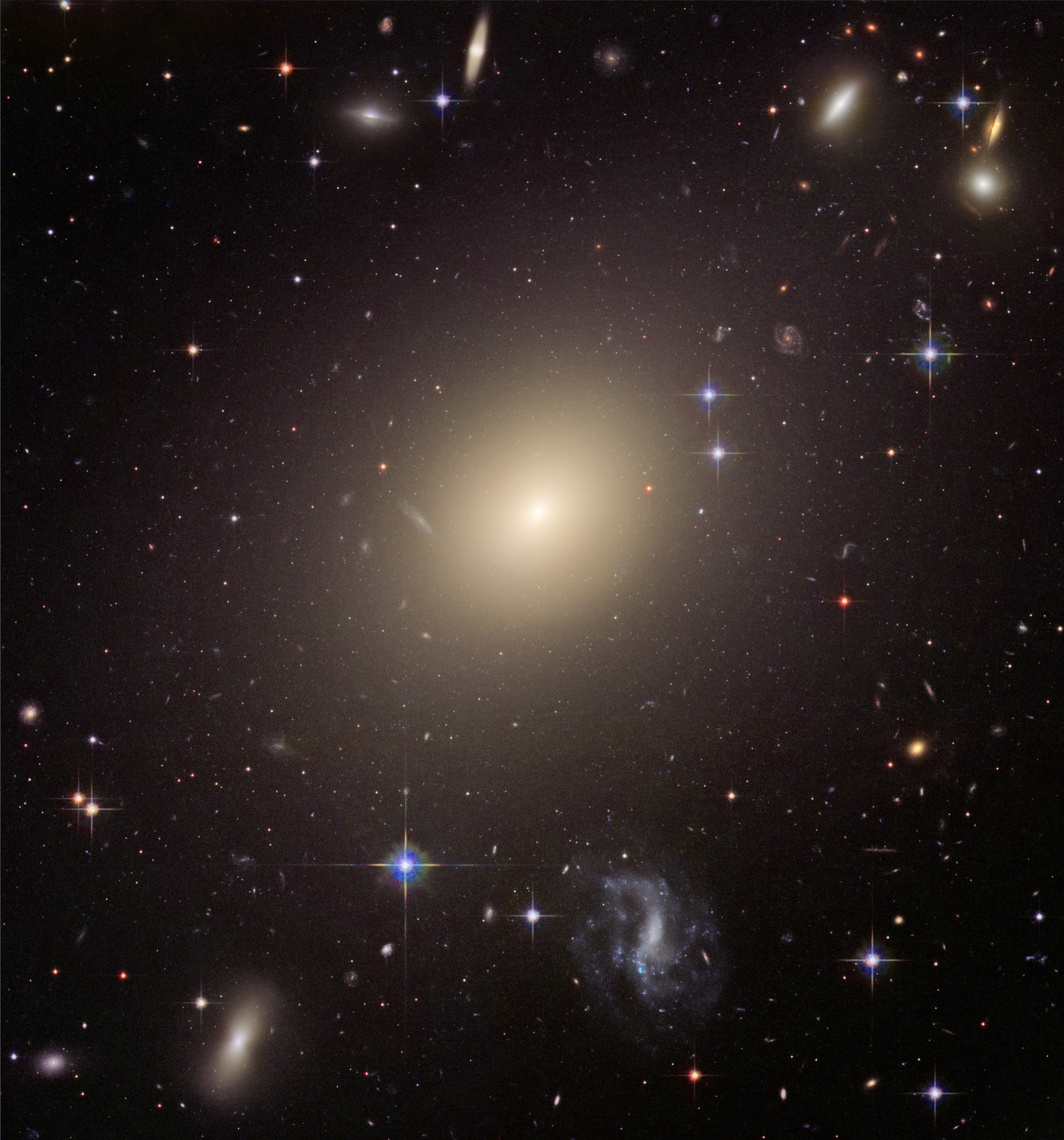
ESO 325-G004, a typical elliptical galaxy

Elliptical galaxies (most notably supergiant ellipticals, such as ESO 306-17) are among some of the largest known thus far. Their stars are on orbits that are randomly oriented within the galaxy (i.e. they are not rotating like disk galaxies). A distinguishing feature of elliptical galaxies is that the velocity of the stars does not necessarily contribute to flattening of the galaxy, such as in spiral galaxies. Elliptical galaxies have central supermassive black holes, and the masses of these black holes correlate with the galaxy's mass.

Elliptical galaxies have two main stages of evolution. The first is due to the supermassive black hole growing by accreting cooling gas. The second stage is marked by the black hole stabilizing by suppressing gas cooling, thus leaving the elliptical galaxy in a stable state. The mass of the black hole is also correlated to a property called sigma which is the dispersion of the velocities of stars in their orbits. This relationship, known as the M-sigma relation, was published in 2000. Recent studies show that this relation only holds over a limited range, steepening at high black hole masses—a behavior explained by the Virial theorem—which reflects the distinct merger history of the most massive elliptical galaxies. Elliptical galaxies mostly lack disks, although some bulges of disk galaxies resemble elliptical galaxies. Elliptical galaxies are more likely found in crowded regions of the universe (such as galaxy clusters).

Astronomers now see elliptical galaxies as some of the most evolved systems in the universe. It is widely accepted that the main driving force for the evolution of elliptical galaxies is mergers of smaller galaxies. Many galaxies in the universe are gravitationally bound to other galaxies, which means that they will never escape their mutual pull. If those colliding galaxies are of similar size, the resultant galaxy will appear similar to neither of the progenitors, but will instead be elliptical. There are many types of galaxy mergers, which do not necessarily result in elliptical galaxies, but result in a structural change. For example, a minor merger event is thought to be occurring between the Milky Way and the Magellanic Clouds.

Mergers between such large galaxies are regarded as violent, and the frictional interaction of the gas between the two galaxies can cause gravitational shock waves, which are capable of forming new stars in the new elliptical galaxy. By sequencing several images of different galactic collisions, one can observe the timeline of two spiral galaxies merging into a single elliptical galaxy.

In the Local Group, the Milky Way and the Andromeda Galaxy are gravitationally bound, and currently approaching each other at high speed. Simulations show that the Milky Way and Andromeda are on a collision course, and are expected to collide in less than five billion years. During this collision, it is expected that the Sun and the rest of the Solar System will be ejected from its current path around the Milky Way. The remnant could be a giant elliptical galaxy.

== Galaxy quenching ==
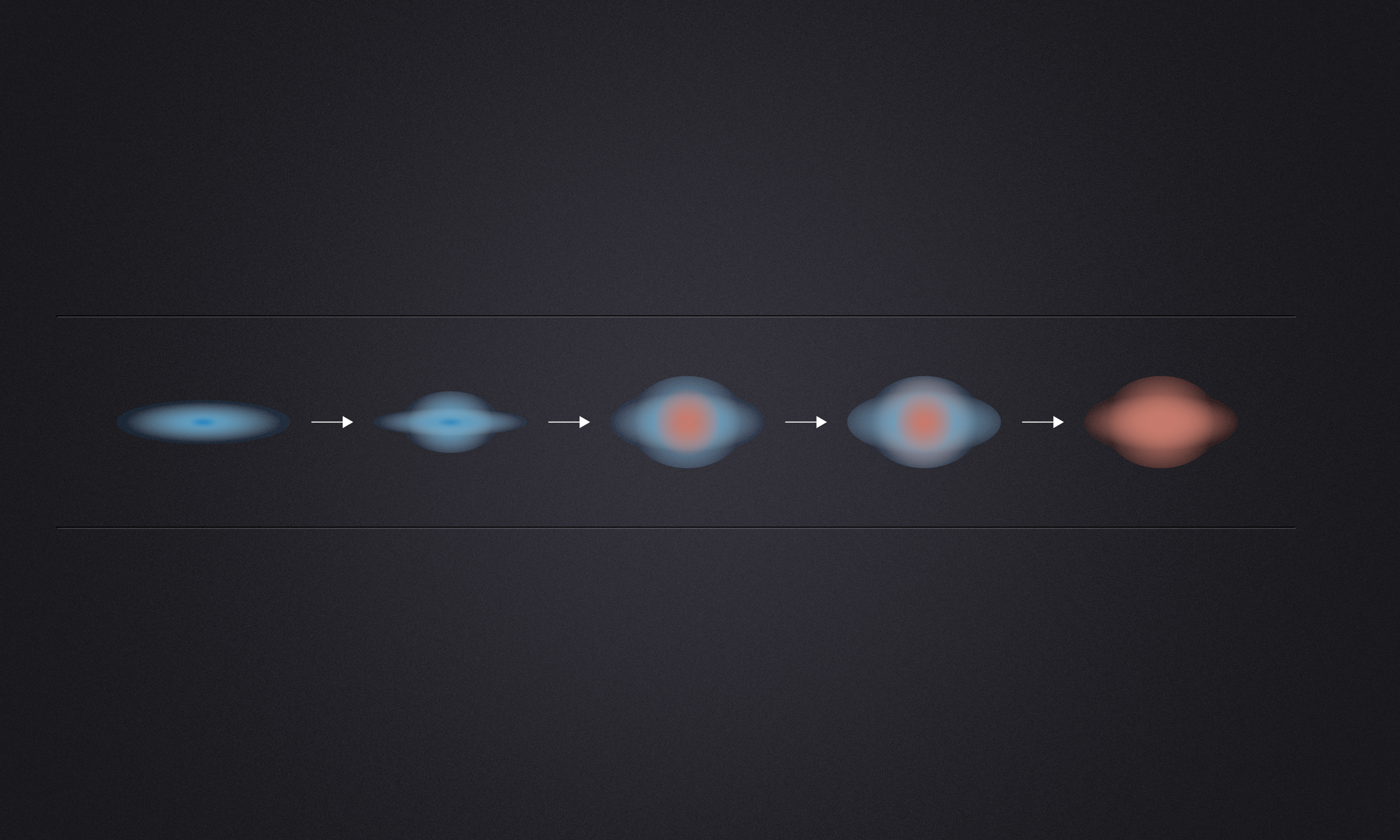
Star formation in what are now "dead" galaxies sputtered out billions of years ago

One observation that must be explained by a successful theory of galaxy evolution is the existence of two different populations of galaxies on the galaxy color-magnitude diagram. Most galaxies tend to fall into two separate locations on this diagram: a "red sequence" and a "blue cloud". Red sequence galaxies are generally non-star-forming elliptical galaxies with little gas and dust, while blue cloud galaxies tend to be dusty star-forming spiral galaxies.

As described in previous sections, galaxies tend to evolve from spiral to elliptical structures via mergers. However, the current rate of galaxy mergers does not explain how all galaxies move from the "blue cloud" to the "red sequence". It also does not explain how star formation ceases in galaxies. Theories of galaxy evolution must therefore be able to explain how star formation turns off in galaxies. This phenomenon is called galaxy "quenching".

Stars form out of cold gas (see also the Kennicutt–Schmidt law), so a galaxy is quenched when it has no more cold gas. However, it is thought that quenching occurs relatively quickly (within 1 billion years), which is much shorter than the time it would take for a galaxy to simply use up its reservoir of cold gas. Galaxy evolution models explain this by hypothesizing other physical mechanisms that remove or shut off the supply of cold gas in a galaxy. These mechanisms can be broadly classified into two categories: (1) preventive feedback mechanisms that stop cold gas from entering a galaxy or stop it from producing stars, and (2) ejective feedback mechanisms that remove gas so that it cannot form stars.

One theorized preventive mechanism called "strangulation" keeps cold gas from entering the galaxy. Strangulation is likely the main mechanism for quenching star formation in nearby low-mass galaxies. The exact physical explanation for strangulation is still unknown, but it may have to do with a galaxy's interactions with other galaxies. As a galaxy falls into a galaxy cluster, gravitational interactions with other galaxies can strangle it by preventing it from accreting more gas. For galaxies with massive dark matter halos, another preventive mechanism called "virial shock heating" may also prevent gas from becoming cool enough to form stars.

Ejective processes, which expel cold gas from galaxies, may explain how more massive galaxies are quenched. One ejective mechanism is caused by supermassive black holes found in the centers of galaxies. Simulations have shown that gas accreting onto supermassive black holes in galactic centers produces high-energy jets; the released energy can expel enough cold gas to quench star formation.

Our own Milky Way and the nearby Andromeda Galaxy currently appear to be undergoing the quenching transition from star-forming blue galaxies to passive red galaxies.

== Hydrodynamic simulations ==
Dark energy and dark matter account for most of the Universe's energy, so it is valid to ignore baryons when simulating large-scale structure formation (using methods such as N-body simulation). However, since the visible components of galaxies consist of baryons, it is crucial to include baryons in the simulation to study the detailed structures of galaxies. At first, the baryon component consists of mostly hydrogen and helium gas, which later transforms into stars during the formation of structures. From observations, models used in simulations can be tested and the understanding of different stages of galaxy formation can be improved.

=== Euler equations ===
In cosmological simulations, astrophysical gases are typically modeled as inviscid ideal gases that follow the Euler equations, which can be expressed mainly in three different ways: Lagrangian, Eulerian, or arbitrary Lagrange-Eulerian methods. Different methods give specific forms of hydrodynamical equations. When using the Lagrangian approach to specify the field, it is assumed that the observer tracks a specific fluid parcel with its unique characteristics during its movement through space and time. In contrast, the Eulerian approach emphasizes particular locations in space that the fluid passes through as time progresses.

=== Baryonic physics ===
To shape the population of galaxies, the hydrodynamical equations must be supplemented by a variety of astrophysical processes mainly governed by baryonic physics.

==== Gas cooling ====
Processes, such as collisional excitation, ionization, and inverse Compton scattering, can cause the internal energy of the gas to be dissipated. In the simulation, cooling processes are realized by coupling cooling functions to energy equations. Besides the primordial cooling, at high temperature,$\ 10^5K< T < 10^7K\,$, heavy elements (metals) cooling dominates. When $\ T < 10^4K\,$, the fine structure and molecular cooling also need to be considered to simulate the cold phase of the interstellar medium.

==== Interstellar medium ====
Complex multi-phase structure, including relativistic particles and magnetic field, makes simulation of interstellar medium difficult. In particular, modeling the cold phase of the interstellar medium poses technical difficulties due to the short timescales associated with the dense gas. In the early simulations, the dense gas phase is frequently not modeled directly but rather characterized by an effective polytropic equation of state. More recent simulations use a multimodal distribution to describe the gas density and temperature distributions, which directly model the multi-phase structure. However, more detailed physics processes needed to be considered in future simulations, since the structure of the interstellar medium directly affects star formation.

==== Star formation ====
As cold and dense gas accumulates, it undergoes gravitational collapse and eventually forms stars. To simulate this process, a portion of the gas is transformed into collisionless star particles, which represent coeval, single-metallicity stellar populations and are described by an initial underlying mass function. Observations suggest that star formation efficiency in molecular gas is almost universal, with around 1% of the gas being converted into stars per free fall time. In simulations, the gas is typically converted into star particles using a probabilistic sampling scheme based on the calculated star formation rate. Some simulations seek an alternative to the probabilistic sampling scheme and aim to better capture the clustered nature of star formation by treating star clusters as the fundamental unit of star formation. This approach permits the growth of star particles by accreting material from the surrounding medium. In addition to this, modern models of galaxy formation track the evolution of these stars and the mass they return to the gas component, leading to an enrichment of the gas with metals.

==== Stellar feedback ====
Stars have an influence on their surrounding gas by injecting energy and momentum. This creates a feedback loop that regulates the process of star formation. To effectively control star formation, stellar feedback must generate galactic-scale outflows that expel gas from galaxies. Various methods are utilized to couple energy and momentum, particularly through supernova explosions, to the surrounding gas. These methods differ in how the energy is deposited, either thermally or kinetically. However, excessive radiative gas cooling must be avoided in the former case. Cooling is expected in dense and cold gas, but it cannot be reliably modeled in cosmological simulations due to low resolution. This leads to artificial and excessive cooling of the gas, causing the supernova feedback energy to be lost via radiation and significantly reducing its effectiveness. In the latter case, kinetic energy cannot be radiated away until it thermalizes. However, using hydrodynamically decoupled wind particles to inject momentum non-locally into the gas surrounding active star-forming regions may still be necessary to achieve large-scale galactic outflows. Recent models explicitly model stellar feedback. These models not only incorporate supernova feedback but also consider other feedback channels such as energy and momentum injection from stellar winds, photoionization, and radiation pressure resulting from radiation emitted by young, massive stars. During the Cosmic Dawn, galaxy formation occurred in short bursts of 5 to 30 Myr due to stellar feedbacks.

==== Supermassive black holes ====
Simulation of supermassive black holes is also considered, numerically seeding them in dark matter haloes, due to their observation in many galaxies and the impact of their mass on the mass density distribution. Their mass accretion rate is frequently modeled by the Bondi-Hoyle model.

==== Active galactic nuclei ====
Active galactic nuclei (AGN) have an impact on the observational phenomena of supermassive black holes, and further have a regulation of black hole growth and star formation. In simulations, AGN feedback is usually classified into two modes, namely quasar and radio mode. Quasar mode feedback is linked to the radiatively efficient mode of black hole growth and is frequently incorporated through energy or momentum injection. The regulation of star formation in massive galaxies is believed to be significantly influenced by radio mode feedback, which occurs due to the presence of highly collimated jets of relativistic particles. These jets are typically linked to X-ray bubbles that possess enough energy to counterbalance cooling losses.

==== Magnetic fields ====
The ideal magnetohydrodynamics approach is commonly utilized in cosmological simulations since it provides a good approximation for cosmological magnetic fields. The effect of magnetic fields on the dynamics of gas is generally negligible on large cosmological scales. Nevertheless, magnetic fields are a critical component of the interstellar medium since they provide pressure support against gravity and affect the propagation of cosmic rays.

==== Cosmic rays ====
Cosmic rays play a significant role in the interstellar medium by contributing to its pressure, serving as a crucial heating channel, and potentially driving galactic gas outflows. The propagation of cosmic rays is highly affected by magnetic fields. So in the simulation, equations describing the cosmic ray energy and flux are coupled to magnetohydrodynamics equations.

==== Radiation hydrodynamics ====
Radiation hydrodynamics simulations are computational methods used to study the interaction of radiation with matter. In astrophysical contexts, radiation hydrodynamics is used to study the epoch of reionization when the Universe had high redshift. There are several numerical methods used for radiation hydrodynamics simulations, including ray-tracing, Monte Carlo, and moment-based methods. Ray-tracing involves tracing the paths of individual photons through the simulation and computing their interactions with matter at each step. This method is computationally expensive but can produce very accurate results.

== Gallery ==
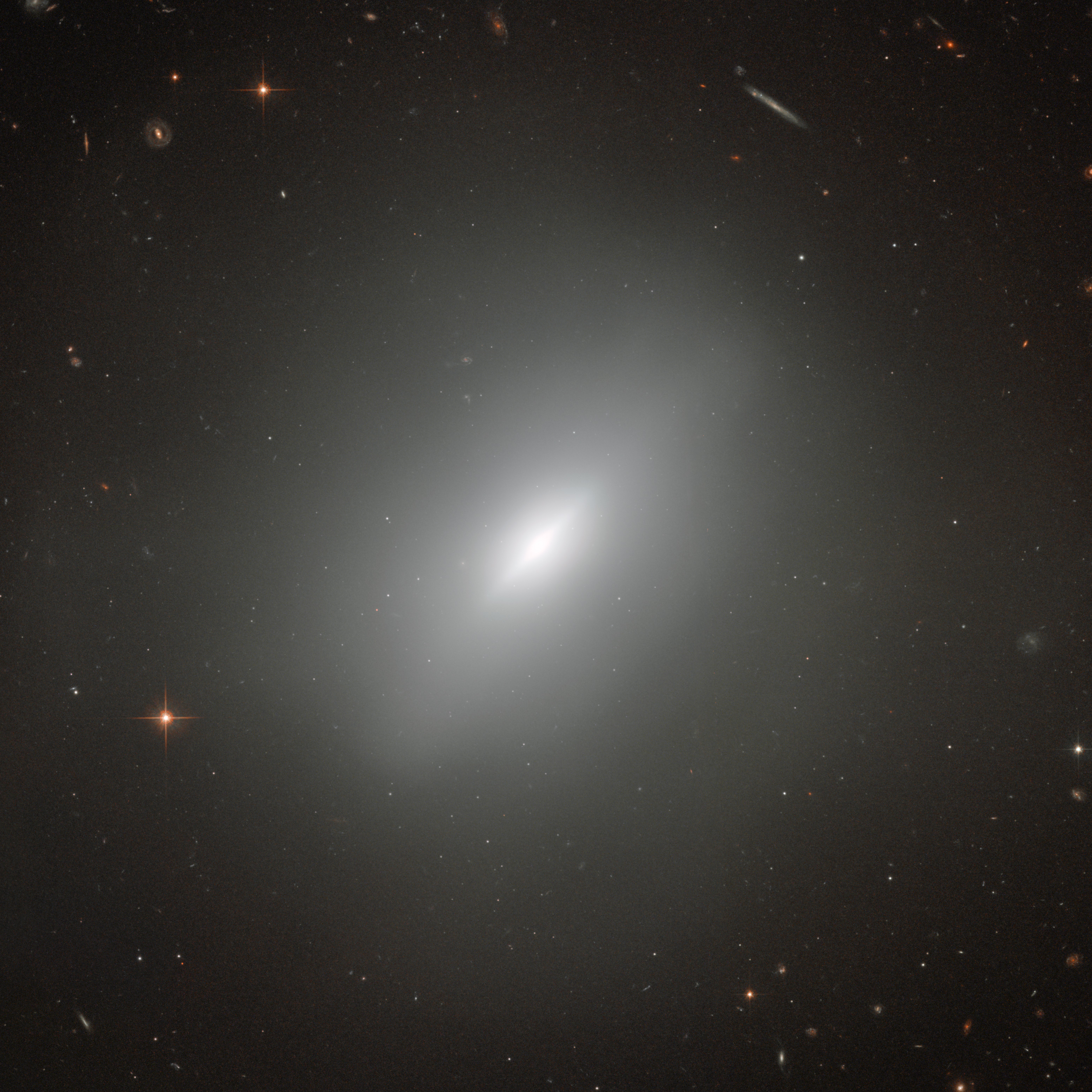
NGC 3610 shows some structure in the form of a bright disc, implying that it formed only a short time ago.

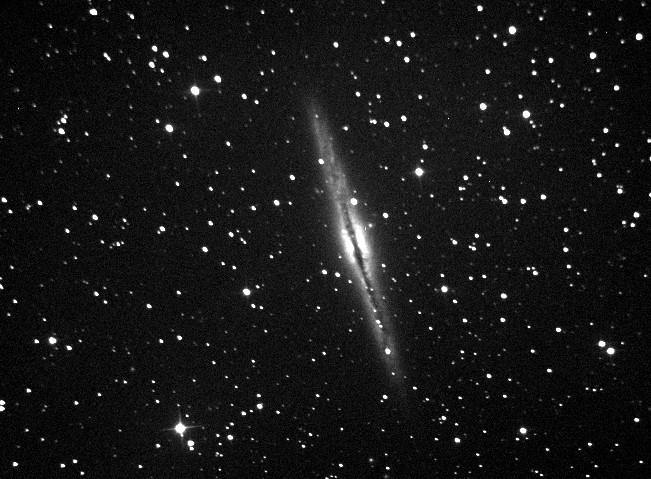
NGC 891, a very thin disk galaxy

An image of Messier 101, a prototypical spiral galaxy seen face-on

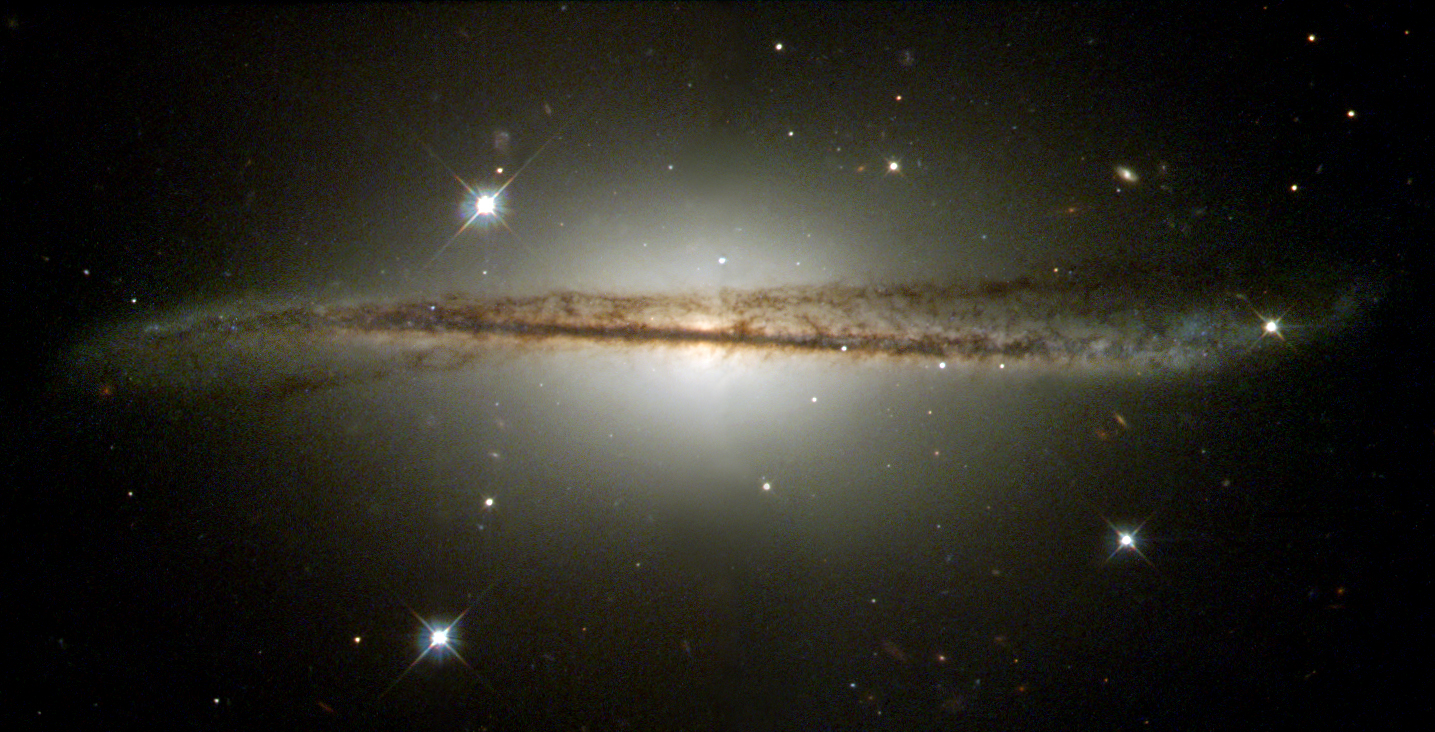
A spiral galaxy, ESO 510-G13, was warped as a result of colliding with another galaxy. After the other galaxy is completely absorbed, the distortion will disappear. The process typically takes millions if not billions of years.

A video of a galaxy forming in an IllustrisTNG astrophysical simulation

== See also ==
- Big Bang – Physical theory of the cosmos
- Blueberry galaxy – Small and very active galaxies.
- Bulge (astronomy) – Tightly packed group of stars within a larger formation
- Chronology of the universe – History and future of the universe
- Cosmology – Study of the universe
- Galactic disc – Component of disc galaxies comprising gas and stars
- Formation and evolution of the Solar System
- Galactic coordinate system – Celestial coordinate system in spherical coordinates, with the Sun as its center
- Galactic corona – Hot, ionised, gaseous component of a galactic halo
- Galactic halo – Spherical component of a galaxy
- Galactic orientation – Spatial orientation of a galactic plane
- Galaxy rotation curve – Observed discrepancy in galactic angular momenta
- Illustris project – Computer-simulated universes
- List of galaxies
- Mass segregation (astronomy) – Gravitational process, eg in star clusters
- Metallicity distribution function – Distribution within a group of stars of the ratio of iron to hydrogen in a star
- Pea galaxy – Possible type of luminous blue compact galaxy
- Recent development (2018): Galaxies with little or no dark matter – Hypothetical invisible cosmic material
- Red nugget, small galaxies packed with large amounts of red stars
- Star formation – Gravitational process studied in astronomy
- Structure formation – Astrophysical models for the formation of galaxies and clusters of galaxies
- UniverseMachine – Computer simulated universes
- Zeldovich pancake – Gas condensation following the Big Bang
