= NGC 3669 =

Galaxy in the constellation Ursa Major

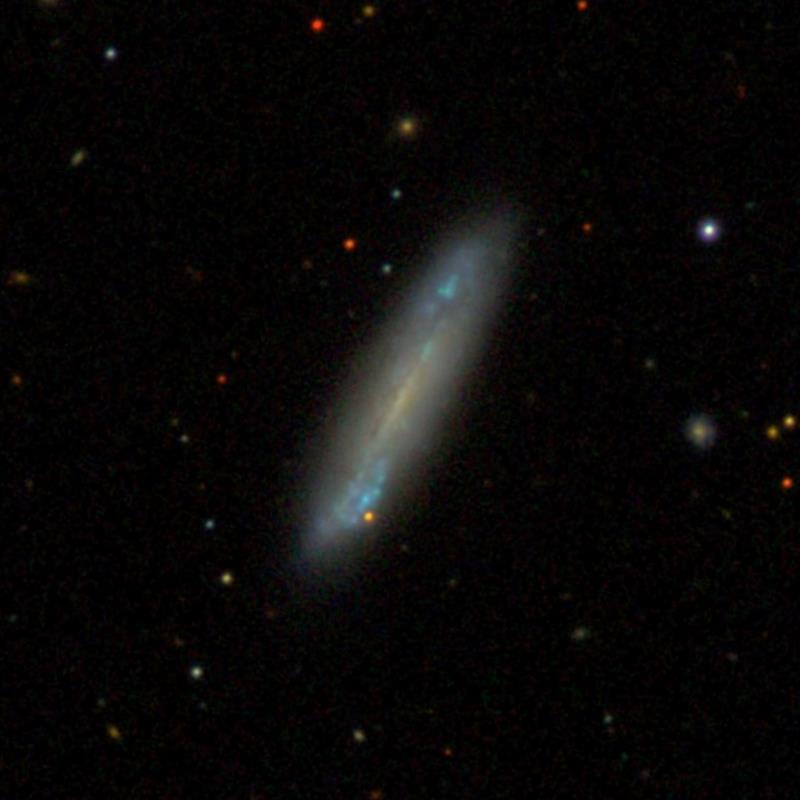
- NGC 3669 by SDSS

Observation data (J2000 epoch)
- Constellation: Ursa Major
- Right ascension: 11^{h} 25^{m} 26.8^{s}
- Declination: +57° 43′ 16.5″
- Redshift: 0.006471 ± 0.000037
- Heliocentric radial velocity: 1,940 ± 11 km/s
- Distance: 115 Mly (35.2 Mpc)
- Apparent magnitude (V): 12.4

Characteristics
- Type: SBcd
- Apparent size (V): 2.2′ × 0.5′

Other designations
- UGC 6431, MCG 10-16-135, ZWG 291.67, IRAS11226+5759, PGC 35113

NGC 3669 (other designations - UGC 6431, MCG 10-16-135, ZWG 291.67, IRAS11226+5759, PGC 35113) is a barred spiral galaxy in the constellation Ursa Major. It was discovered by William Herschel on March 18, 1790. The galaxy is seen edge-on and appears to be slightly warped. It has a small bulge.

It is a member of the NGC 3610 galaxy group. Members of the group that lie at a smaller projected distance from NGC 3669 include NGC 3674 and NGC 3683A 40′–50′ to the south and southeast and NGC 3613 and NGC 3619 40′–50′ to the west. Four satellite candidates have been detected near NGC 3669.
