= NGC 3625 =

Galaxy in the constellation Ursa Major

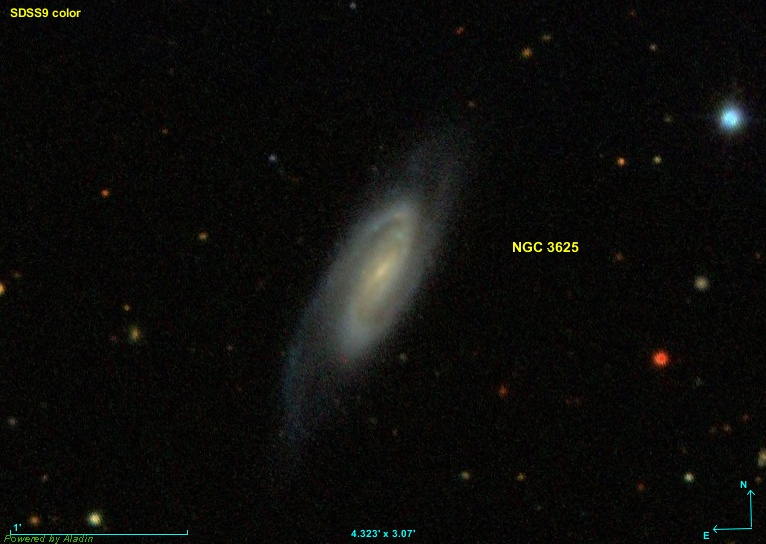
- NGC 3625 imaged by SDSS

Observation data (J2000 epoch)
- Constellation: Ursa Major
- Right ascension: 11^{h} 20^{m} 31.2936^{s}
- Declination: +57° 46′ 53.526″
- Redshift: 0.006484±0.00000900
- Heliocentric radial velocity: 1,944±3 km/s
- Distance: 123.74 ± 5.12 Mly (37.940 ± 1.569 Mpc)
- Group or cluster: NGC 3613 group (LGG 232)
- Apparent magnitude (V): 14.0g

Characteristics
- Type: SAB(s)b
- Size: ~75,600 ly (23.18 kpc) (estimated)
- Apparent size (V): 1.73′ × 0.62′

Other designations
- IRAS F11176+5803, 2MASX J11203125+5746527, UGC 6348, MCG +10-16-120, PGC 34718, CGCG 291-057

NGC 3625 is an intermediate spiral galaxy in the constellation of Ursa Major. Its velocity with respect to the cosmic microwave background is 2,102±11 km/s, which corresponds to a Hubble distance of 101.1 ± 7.1 Mly (31.00 ± 2.18 Mpc). However, five non-redshift measurements give a farther mean distance of 123.74 ± 5.12 Mly (37.940 ± 1.569 Mpc). It was discovered by German-British astronomer William Herschel on 8 April 1793.

NGC 3625 has a possible active galactic nucleus, i.e. it has a compact region at the center of a galaxy that emits a significant amount of energy across the electromagnetic spectrum, with characteristics indicating that this luminosity is not produced by the stars.

== NGC 3613 group ==
According to A.M. Garcia, NGC 3625 is a member of the NGC 3613 group (also known as LGG 232). The other galaxies in the group are NGC 3613, NGC 3669, and UGC 6344.

== Supernova ==
One supernova has been observed in NGC 3625:

- SN 1983W (Type Ia, mag. 16.5) was discovered by Thomas Schildknecht on 6 December 1983.

== See also ==
- List of NGC objects (3001–4000)
