= Metallicity distribution function =

Distribution within a group of stars of the ratio of iron to hydrogen in a star

The metallicity distribution function is an important concept in stellar and galactic evolution. It is a curve of what proportion of stars have a particular metallicity ([Fe/H], the relative abundance of iron and hydrogen) of a population of stars such as in a cluster or galaxy.

MDFs are used to test different theories of galactic evolution. Much of the iron in a star will have come from earlier type Ia supernovae. Other [alpha] metals can be produced in core collapse supernovae.
