= Abell S740 =

Galaxy cluster in the constellation Centaurus

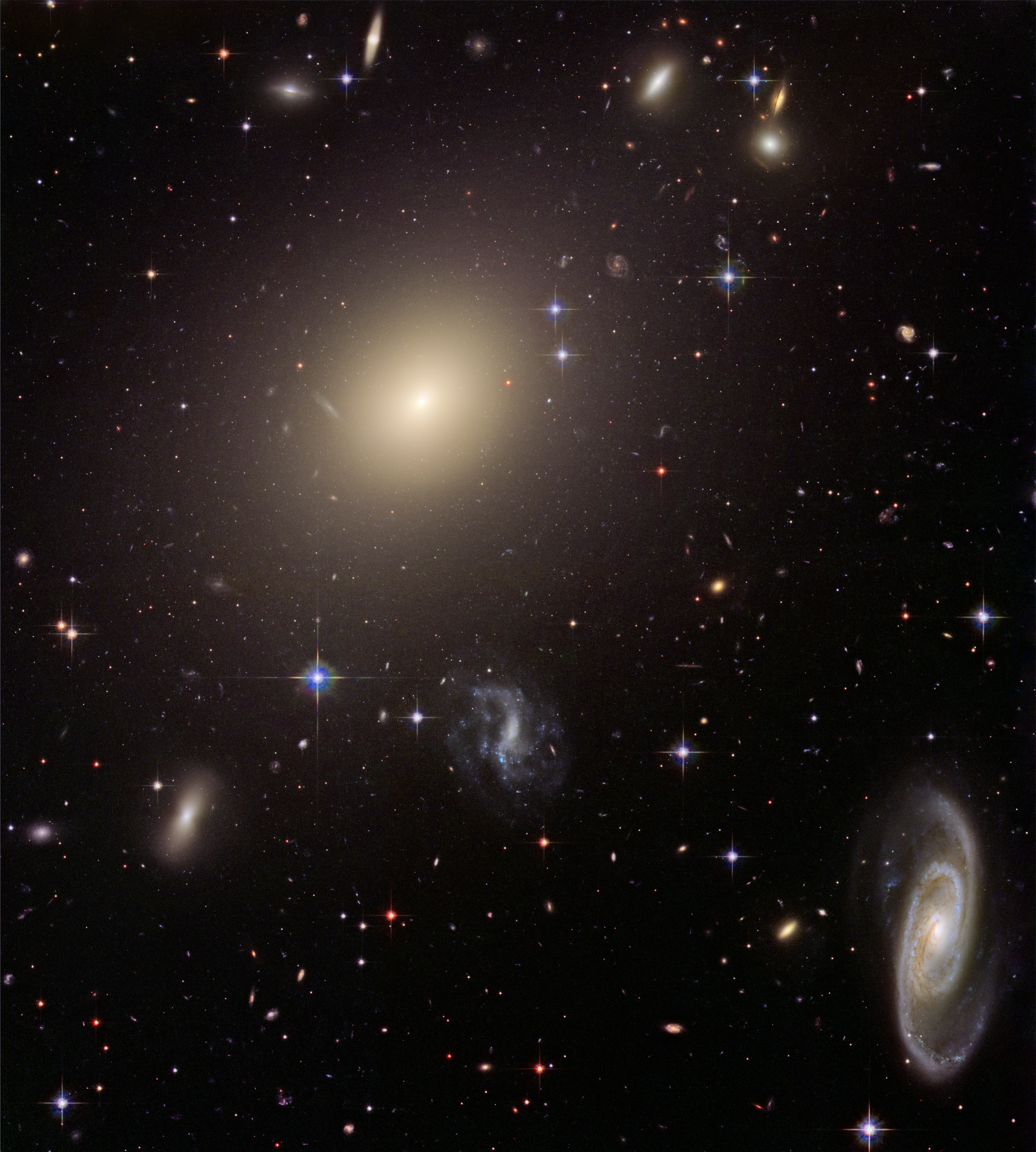
- Hubble Illuminates Cluster of Diverse Galaxies in Abell S740

Observation data (Epoch J2000)
- Constellation(s): Centaurus
- Right ascension: 13^{h} 43^{m} 32.3^{s}
- Declination: −38° 11′ 05″
- Brightest member: ESO 325-G004
- Richness class: 0
- Bautz–Morgan classification: I–II
- Redshift: 0.03360 (10,073 km/s)
- Distance: 146 Mpc (476 Mly) h^{−1}_{0.705}

The Abell S740 is a cluster of galaxies identified in the Abell catalogue of southern rich clusters of galaxies. It is over 450 Mly away in the constellation Centaurus. It has a redshift of 10,073 km/s.

== See also ==
- Abell catalogue
- List of Abell clusters
