= ESO 510-G13 =

Galaxy in the constellation of Hydra

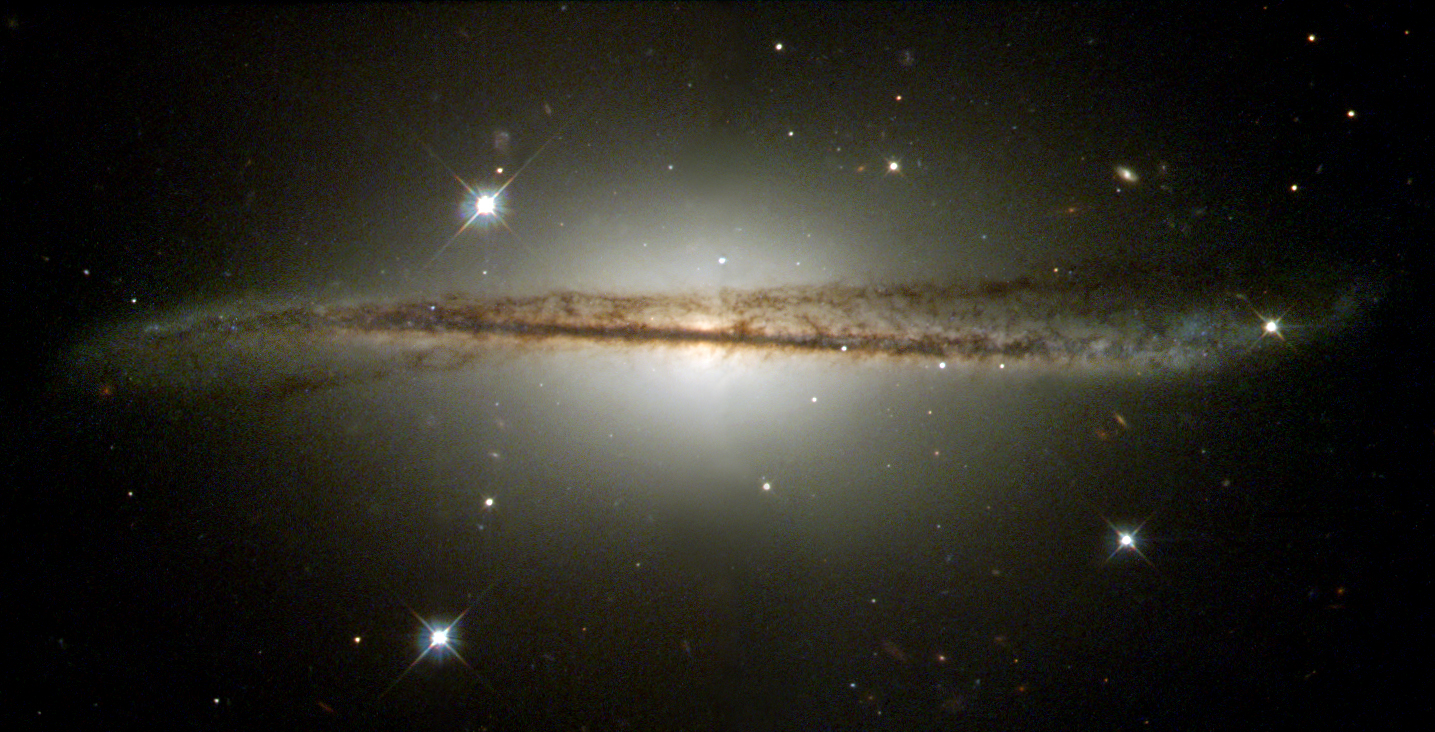
- Spiral galaxy ESO 510-G13 by Hubble Space Telescope

Observation data (J2000 epoch)
- Constellation: Hydra
- Right ascension: 13^{h} 55^{m} 04.3^{s}
- Declination: −26° 46′ 50″
- Redshift: 3455 ± 9 km/s
- Apparent magnitude (V): 13.4

Characteristics
- Type: Sa: pec sp
- Apparent size (V): 1.9′ × 1.3′

Other designations
- MCG-04-33-013, PGC 49473

ESO 510-G13 is a spiral galaxy approximately 150 million light-years away in the constellation Hydra. The equatorial dust cloud is heavily warped; this may indicate that ESO 510-G13 has interacted with another galaxy. If this is the case, it would provide an excellent illustration of the distortion caused by interacting galaxies, discussed in the article Galaxy formation and evolution under the Spiral galaxy heading.

This galaxy was examined by the Hubble Space Telescope in 2001.

== See also ==
- Antennae Galaxies
- Centaurus A
