= NGC 3445 =

Galaxy in the constellation Ursa Major

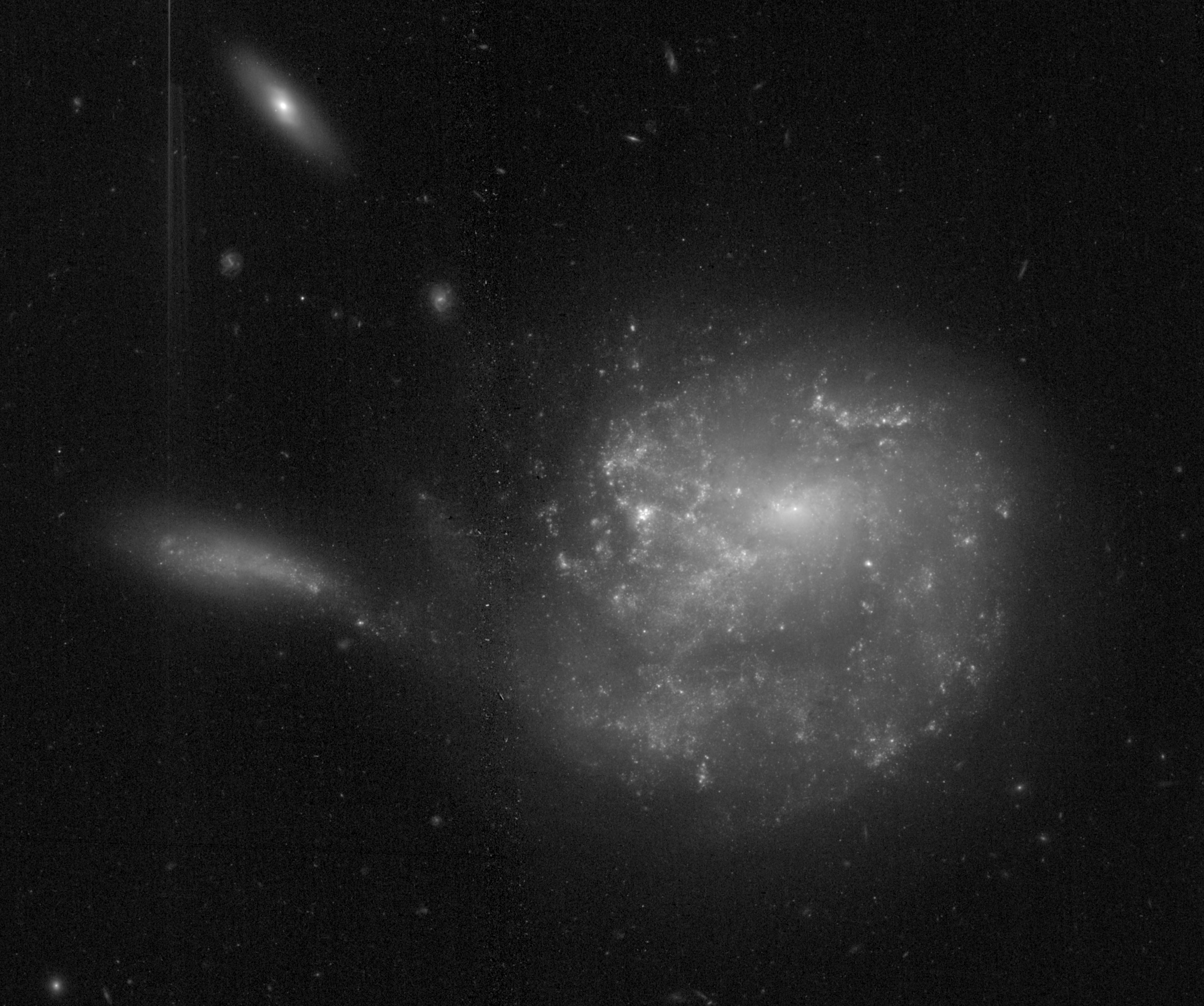
- NGC 3445 by Hubble Space Telescope

Observation data (J2000 epoch)
- Constellation: Ursa Major
- Right ascension: 10^{h} 54^{m} 35.5^{s}
- Declination: +56° 59′ 26″
- Redshift: 0.006831 ± 0.000003
- Heliocentric radial velocity: 2,048 ± 1 km/s
- Distance: 73.8 ± 20.1 Mly (22.6 ± 6.2 Mpc)
- Apparent magnitude (V): 12.3

Characteristics
- Type: SAB(s)m
- Apparent size (V): 1.6′ × 1.5′
- Notable features: Interacting galaxy

Other designations
- UGC 6021, Arp 24, VV 14a, MCG +10-16-023, IRAS 10515+5715, PGC 32772, 7C 1051+5715

NGC 3445 is a Magellanic spiral galaxy in the constellation Ursa Major. The galaxy lies about 75 million light years away from Earth, which means, given its apparent dimensions, that NGC 3445 is approximately 35,000 light years across. It was discovered by William Herschel on April 8, 1793.

== Characteristics ==
The galaxy is included in Halton Arp's Atlas of Peculiar Galaxies in the one-armed spiral galaxies category. The galaxy has a thick arm pattern with many HII regions. A large spiral arm is visible at the south part of the galaxy while a weaker one is visible in infrared at the north. Radio emission is observed along the arms. At the end of the main spiral arm there is a smaller galaxy, lying 1.2 arcminutes from the nucleus of NGC 3445, connected with a weak bridge.

In the infrared are visible four bright locations of active star formation. The brightest of these infrared knots hosts five young massive star clusters, all being formed by a single giant molecular cloud. The age of the clusters was determined to be 3 to 5 million years and their mass to be around 10^{5} M_{☉}. Another large star cluster lies at the nucleus of the galaxy and could be in the process of forming a bulge. The total star formation rate of the galaxy is estimated to be around 1 M_{☉} per year. The star formation as well as the shape of the galaxy could be the result of interaction with other galaxies.

== Nearby galaxies ==
NGC 3445 forms a triplet with NGC 3440, which lies 9.9 arcminutes away, and NGC 3458, which lies 14 arcminutes away. These galaxies comprise the LGG 226 group. It belongs to the same galaxy cloud as NGC 3610.
