= T Scorpii =

Nova seen in 1860

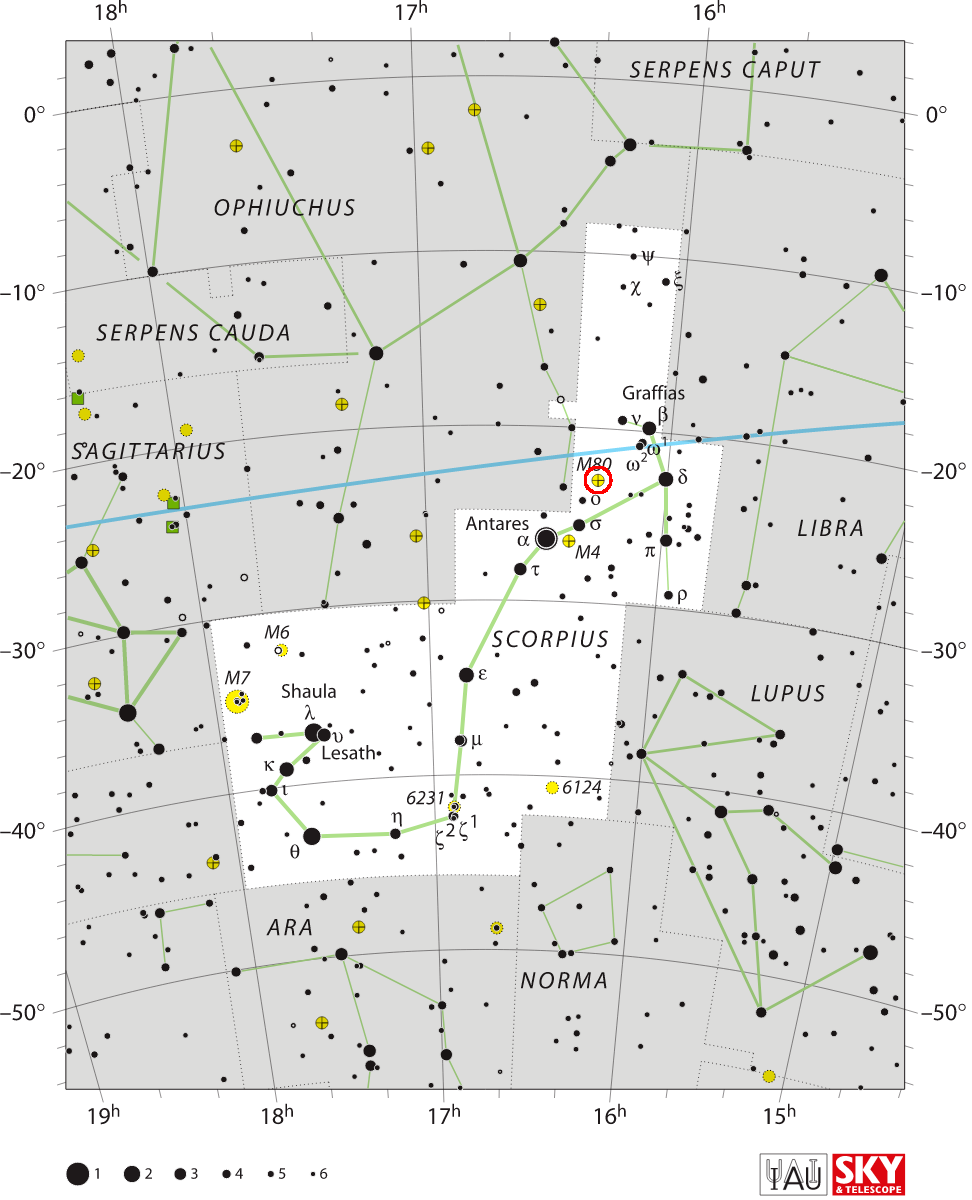
- Location of T Scorpii (circled in red)

Observation data Epoch J2000.0 (ICRS) Equinox J2000.0 (ICRS)
- Constellation: Scorpius
- Right ascension: 16^{h} 17^{m} 02.82^{s}
- Declination: −22° 58′ 33.9″
- Apparent magnitude (V): 6.8-<12.0

Astrometry
Distance	32.6 kly (10.0 kpc) ly

Characteristics
- Variable type: NA (Fast nova)

Other designations
- Nova Scorpii 1860, AAVSO 1611-22C

Database references
SIMBAD	data

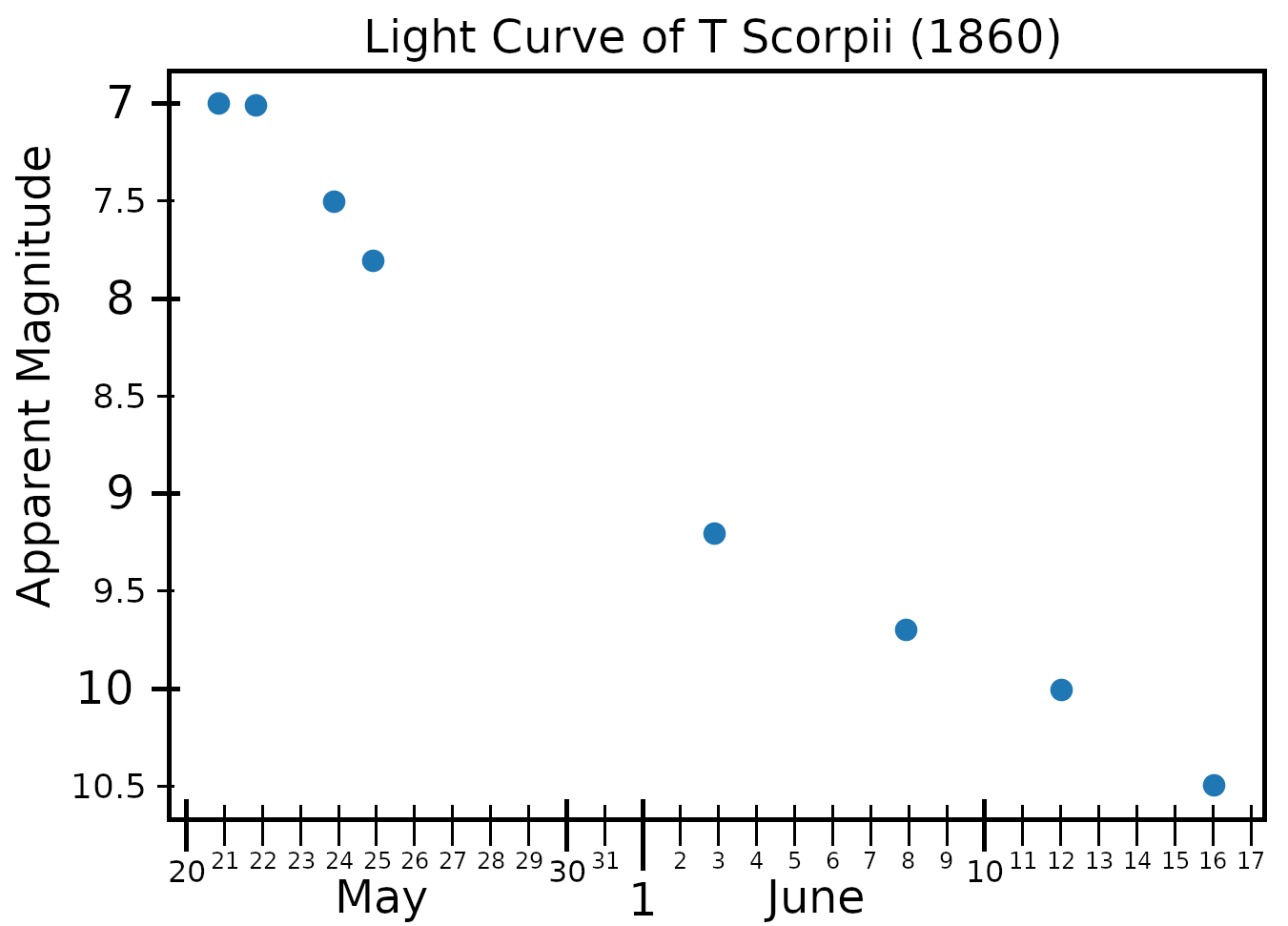
The light curve of T Scorpii, plotted from measurements by Arthur von Auwers

T Scorpii, or Nova Scorpii 1860, was a nova in the globular cluster Messier 80 (M80). It was discovered on 21 May 1860 by Arthur von Auwers at Koenigsberg Observatory and was independently discovered by Norman Pogson on May 28 at Hartwell observatory. It was at magnitude 7.5 at discovery, reaching a maximum of magnitude 6.8, outshining the whole cluster.

T Scorpii was the first nova ever observed in any type of star cluster. As of 2019 it was still the only classical nova known for certain to have occurred in a globular cluster. T Scorpii faded by more than 3 magnitudes in 26 days, which means it was a "fast nova". Auwers reported that he had been observing M80 frequently since the beginning of 1859, and the nova was not visible when he observed it on 18 May 1860, 3 days before he first saw the nova. The nova was located less than 3 arc seconds from the center of M80. Astronomers recognized the significance of this object and for at least seven years after its discovery they closely monitored M80's appearance, but the star was never seen again by 19th century observers.

In 1995 Shara and Drissen announced that they had identified the quiescent nova using Hubble Space Telescope images, however in 2010 Dieball et al. identified a different star as the quiescent nova, based on ultraviolet and X-ray observations. Subsequent publications support the Dieball et al. identification.
