= Messier 80 =

Globular cluster in the constellation Scorpius

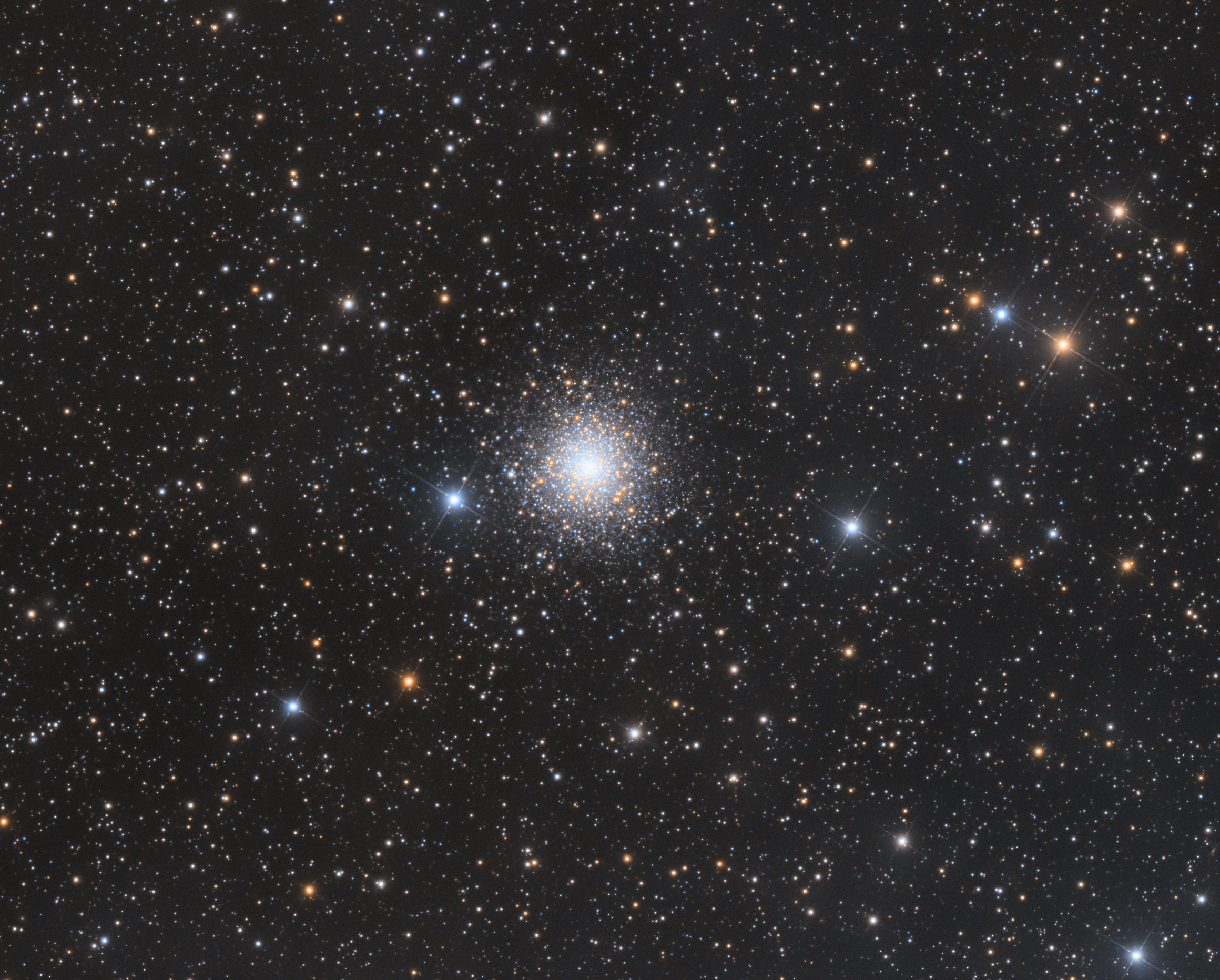
- Messier 80 captured in 2026

Observation data (J2000 epoch)
- Class: II
- Constellation: Scorpius
- Right ascension: 16^{h} 17^{m} 02.41^{s}
- Declination: –22° 58′ 33.9″
- Distance: 32.6 kly (10.0 kpc)
- Apparent magnitude (V): 7.3
- Apparent dimensions (V): 10.0′

Physical characteristics
- Mass: 5.02×10^{5} M_{☉}
- Radius: 48 ly
- Metallicity: [Fe/H] = –1.47 dex
- Estimated age: 13.5 ± 1.0 Gyr
- Other designations: M80, NGC 6093, GCl 39

Messier 80 (also known as M80 or NGC 6093) is a globular cluster located approximately 32,600 light-years (10,000 pc) from Earth in the constellation Scorpius. Discovered by Charles Messier in 1781, it is one of the densest globular clusters in the Milky Way, containing several hundred thousand stars within a spatial diameter of about 95 light-years.

The cluster is situated in the Galactic halo, more than twice as distant as the Galactic Center, and lies midway between the stars α Scorpii (Antares) and β Scorpii in a region rich with nebulæ. With an apparent angular diameter of 10 arcminutes, it can be observed from locations below the 67th parallel north using modest amateur telescopes, where it appears as a mottled ball of light under low light pollution conditions.

Messier 80 is notable for its high population of blue stragglers, stars that appear younger than the cluster itself. Hubble Space Telescope observations reveal these stars are concentrated in distinct regions, suggesting frequent stellar interactions or collisions in the cluster's dense core. On May 21, 1860, the cluster hosted the nova T Scorpii, which briefly outshone the entire cluster with an absolute magnitude of −8.5 and reached an apparent magnitude of +7.0, visible through telescopes and binoculars.

== Gallery ==
M80 is on the far-right edge of this image of Rho Ophiuchi cloud complex toward the top

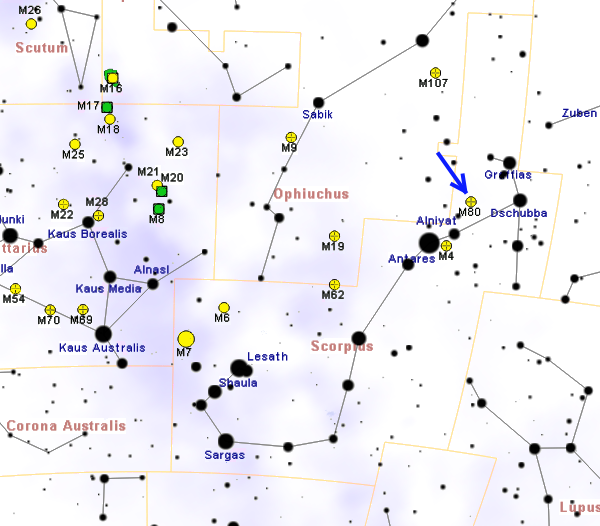
Map showing the location of M80

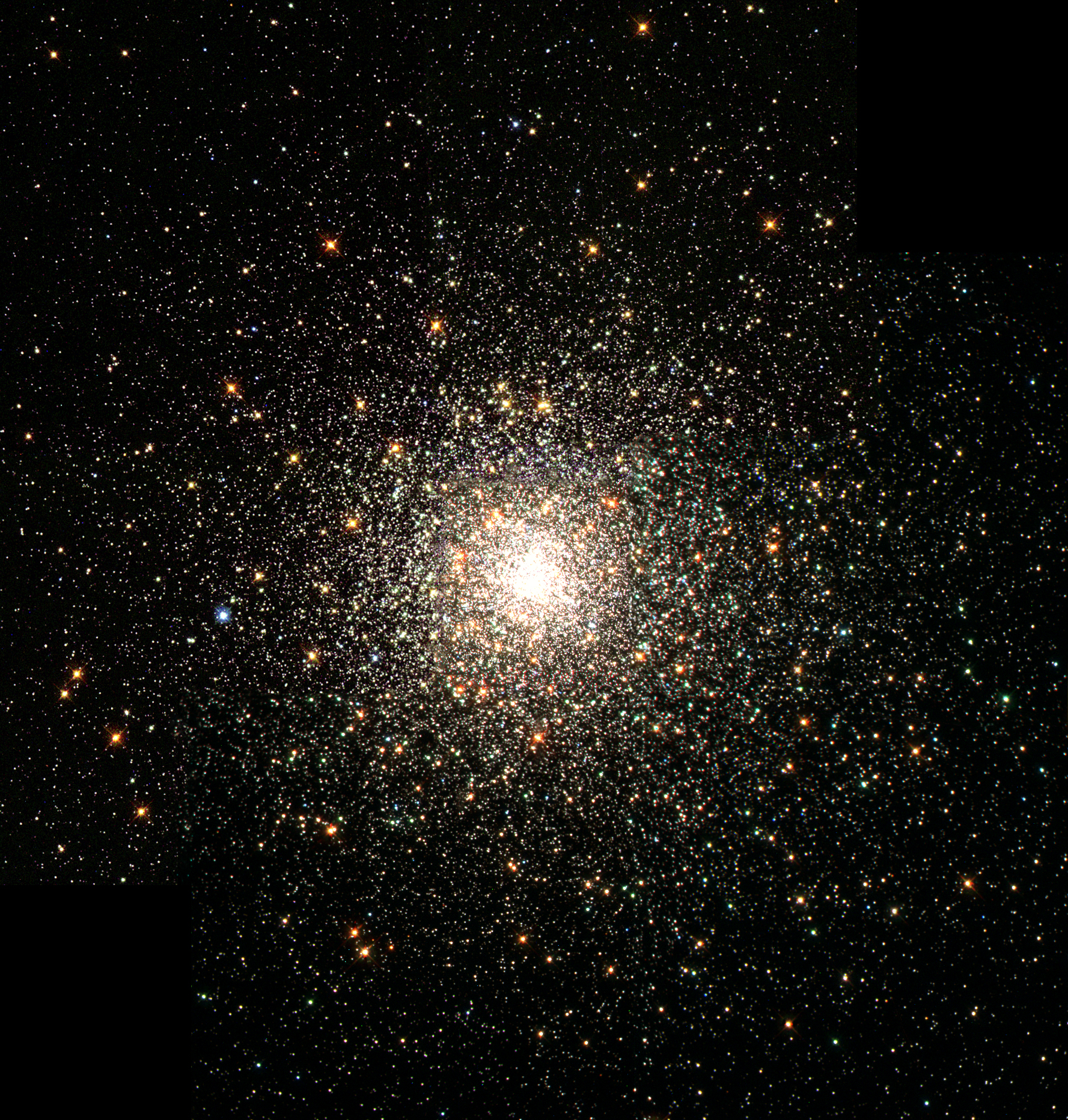
A Hubble Space Telescope (HST) image of M80

== See also ==
- List of Messier objects
