= NGC 3619 =

Unbarred lenticular galaxy in the constellation Ursa Major

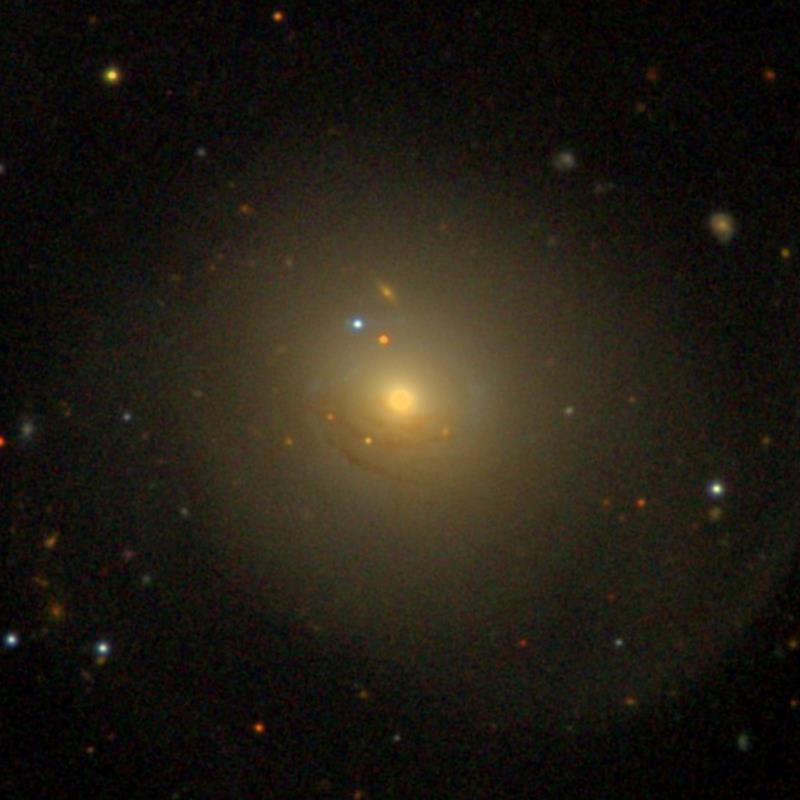
- SDSS image of NGC 3619

Observation data (J2000 epoch)
- Constellation: Ursa Major
- Right ascension: 11^{h} 19^{m} 21.621^{s}
- Declination: +57° 45′ 27.66″
- Redshift: 0.005240
- Heliocentric radial velocity: 1,567±47 km/s
- Distance: 87 Mly (26.8 Mpc)
- Apparent magnitude (V): 11.5
- Apparent magnitude (B): 12.6

Characteristics
- Type: (R)SA(s)0^{+}
- Apparent size (V): 2.7′ × 2.3′

Other designations
- UGC 6330, MCG +10-16-115, PGC 34641

NGC 3619 is an unbarred lenticular galaxy located in the northern constellation of Ursa Major. It was discovered by the German-British astronomer William Herschel on March 18, 1790. This galaxy has an apparent visual magnitude of 11.5 and an angular size of 2.7′ × 2.3′. It is located at a distance of 87 million light-years (26.8 Mpc), where it is a member of a rich galaxy cluster with at least five members.

The morphological classification of NGC 3619 is (R)SA(s)0^{+}, matching a lenticular galaxy (SA0) with no inner ring (s), and a system of outer shells (R). It has a relatively large amount of gas with a spiral structure, and an asymmetrical circumnuclear gaseous disk. The gas is concentrated at the center where star formation is occurring. The overall optical structure and gas enhancement suggests a past merger or accretion event, possibly as the result of an interaction with NGC 3625 or a dwarf galaxy.
