= Metallicity =

Relative abundance of heavy elements in a star or other astronomical object

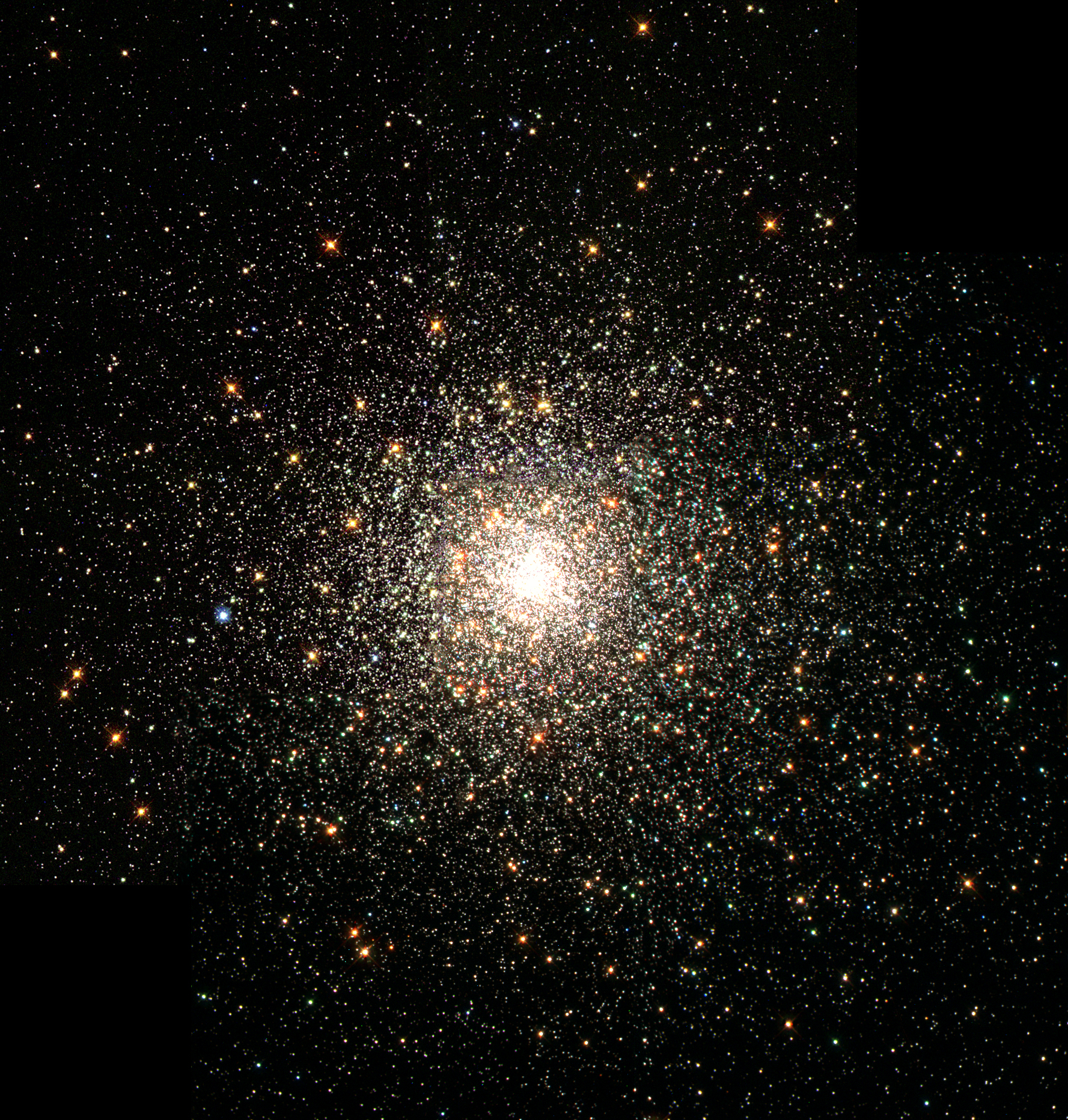
The globular cluster M80. Stars in globular clusters are mainly older metal-poor members of population II.

In astronomy, metallicity is the abundance of elements present in an object that are heavier than hydrogen and helium. Most of the normal currently detectable (i.e. non-dark) matter in the universe is either hydrogen or helium, and astronomers use the word metals as convenient shorthand for all elements except hydrogen and helium. This word-use is distinct from the conventional chemical or physical definition of a metal as an electrically conducting element. Stars and nebulae with relatively high abundances of heavier elements are called metal-rich in discussions of metallicity, even though many of those elements are called nonmetals in chemistry.

The presence of heavier elements is the result of stellar nucleosynthesis. The majority of elements that are heavier than hydrogen and helium in the Universe are formed in the cores of stars as they evolve. Over time, stellar winds and supernovae deposit those heavier metals into the surrounding environment, which enriches the interstellar medium and provides material for the birth of new stars. Older generations of stars formed in a metal-poor early stage of the Universe, so it follows that they have lower metallicities than younger generations of stars which formed in a more metal-rich Universe.

The metallicity of a star is most often expressed in terms of [Fe/H], which represents the logarithmic ratio of iron to hydrogen relative to the Sun's value. There are several compounding reasons for why this scale has become adopted as the standard: iron abundance in a galaxy increases roughly linearly with time through successive generations of stellar nucleosynthesis and supernova enrichment, iron has a rich spectrum that creates hundreds of absorption lines across the optical range, making iron lines extremely prominent when mapping the solar spectrum, and finally, iron was recognized as the default reference element in the mid-20th century due to how reliably it could be measured, today's standards are built on a history of iron-centric calibrations.

== Metals in early spectroscopy ==
Solar spectrum with Fraunhofer lines as it appears visually.

In 1802, William Hyde Wollaston noted the appearance of a number of dark features in the solar spectrum. In 1814, Joseph von Fraunhofer independently rediscovered the lines and began to systematically study and measure their wavelengths, and they are now called Fraunhofer lines. He mapped over 570 lines, designating the most prominent with the letters A through K and weaker lines with other letters.

About 45 years later, Gustav Kirchhoff and Robert Bunsen noticed that several Fraunhofer lines coincide with characteristic emission lines identified in the spectra of heated chemical elements. They inferred that dark lines in the solar spectrum are caused by absorption by chemical elements in the solar atmosphere. Their observations were in the visible range where the strongest lines come from metals such as sodium, potassium, and iron. In the early work on the chemical composition of the sun the only elements that were detected in spectra were hydrogen and various metals, with the term metallic frequently used when describing them. In contemporary usage in astronomy all the extra elements beyond just hydrogen and helium are termed metallic.

== Origin of metallic elements ==
The presence of heavier elements results from stellar nucleosynthesis, where the majority of elements heavier than hydrogen and helium in the Universe (metals, hereafter) are formed in the cores of stars as they evolve. Over time, stellar winds and supernovae deposit the metals into the surrounding environment, enriching the interstellar medium and providing recycling materials for the birth of new stars. It follows that older generations of stars, which formed in the metal-poor early Universe, generally have lower metallicities than those of younger generations, which formed in a more metal-rich Universe.

== Stellar populations ==
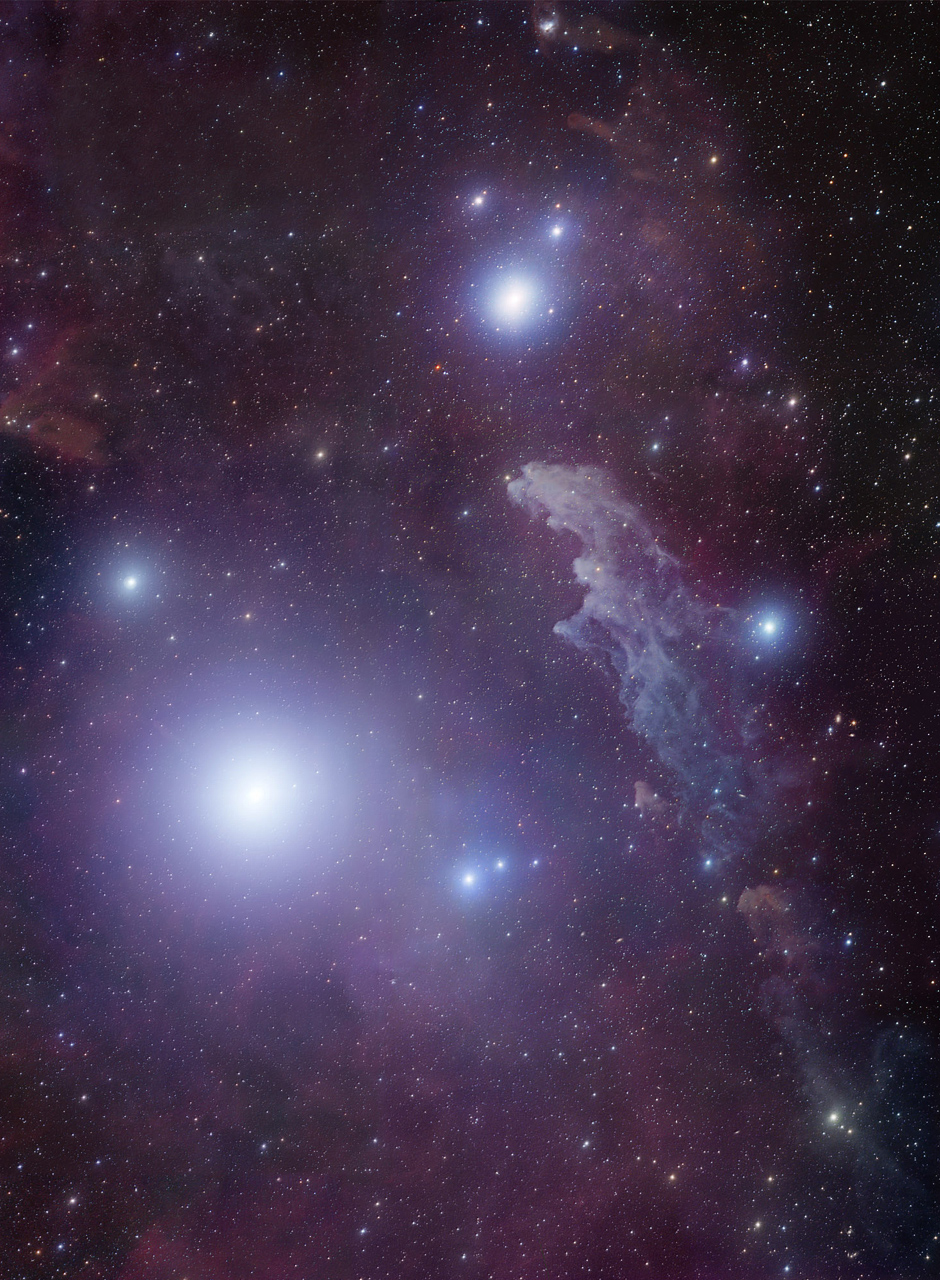
Population I star Rigel with reflection nebula IC 2118

Observed changes in the chemical abundances of different types of stars, based on the spectral peculiarities that were later attributed to metallicity, led astronomer Walter Baade in 1944 to propose the existence of two different populations of stars. These became commonly known as population I (metal-rich) and population II (metal-poor) stars. A third, earliest stellar population was hypothesized in 1978, known as population III stars. These "extremely metal-poor" (XMP) stars are theorized to have been the "first-born" stars created in the Universe.

== Common methods of calculation ==
Astronomers use several different methods to describe and approximate metal abundances, depending on the available tools and the object of interest. Some methods include determining the fraction of mass that is attributed to gas versus metals, or measuring the ratios of the number of atoms of two different elements as compared to the ratios found in the Sun.

=== Mass fraction ===
Stellar composition is often simply defined by the parameters X, Y, and Z. Here X represents the mass fraction of hydrogen, Y is the mass fraction of helium, and Z is the mass fraction of all the remaining chemical elements. Thus

$$X + Y + Z = 1$$

In most stars, nebulae, H II regions, and other astronomical sources, hydrogen and helium are the two dominant elements. The hydrogen mass fraction is generally expressed as $\ X \equiv \tfrac{m_\ce{H}}{M}\ ,$ where M is the total mass of the system, and $\ m_\ce{H}\$ is the mass of the hydrogen it contains. Similarly, the helium mass fraction is denoted as $\ Y \equiv \tfrac{m_\ce{He}}{M} ~.$ The remainder of the elements are collectively referred to as "metals", and the mass fraction of metals is calculated as

$$Z = \sum_{e > \ce{He}} \tfrac{m_e}{M} = 1 - X - Y ~.$$

For the surface of the Sun (symbol $\odot$), these parameters are measured to have the following values:

Description	Solar value
Hydrogen mass fraction	$\ X_\odot = 0.7684 \pm 0.0035\$
Helium mass fraction	$\ Y_\odot = 0.2485 \pm 0.0034\$
Metal mass fraction	$\ Z_\odot = 0.0165 \pm 0.0010$
Metal-to-hydrogen ratio	$\ Z_\odot/\ X_\odot = 0.0225 \pm 0.0014$

The solar modelling problem was a persistent discrepancy between helioseismological observations and solar interior models beginning in the early 2000s. It was based on a 1998 measurement of the solar metallicity, which was approximately $\ Z_\odot/\ X_\odot = 0.0187 \pm 0.0009$ It was resolved with a 2022 analysis which updated the solar metallicity, in close agreement with pre-1998 measurements.

Due to the effects of stellar evolution, neither the initial composition nor the present day bulk composition of the Sun is the same as its present-day surface composition.

=== Chemical abundance ratios ===
The overall stellar metallicity is conventionally defined using the total hydrogen content, since its abundance is considered to be relatively constant in the Universe, or the iron content of the star, which has an abundance that is generally linearly increasing in time in the Universe. Hence, iron can be used as a chronological indicator of nucleosynthesis. Iron is relatively easy to measure with spectral observations in the star's spectrum given the large number of iron lines in the star's spectra (even though oxygen is the most abundant heavy element – see metallicities in H II regions below). The abundance ratio is the common logarithm of the ratio of a star's iron abundance compared to that of the Sun and is calculated thus:

$$\left[ \frac{ \ce{Fe} }{ \ce{H} } \right] ~=~ \log_{10}{\left( \frac{N_{\ce{Fe}}}{N_{\ce{H}} } \right)_\star } -~ \log_{10}{\left(\frac{N_{ \ce{Fe}} }{ N_{\ce{H}} } \right)_\odot}\ ,$$

where $\ N_{\ce{Fe}}\$ and $\ N_{\ce{H}}\$ are the number of iron and hydrogen atoms per unit of volume respectively, $\odot$ is the standard symbol for the Sun, and $\star$ for a star (often omitted below). The unit often used for metallicity is the dex, contraction of "decimal exponent". By this formulation, stars with a higher metallicity than the Sun have a positive common logarithm, whereas those more dominated by hydrogen have a corresponding negative value. For example, stars with a $\ \left[\tfrac{ \ce{Fe} }{ \ce{H} } \right]_\star\$ value of +1 have 10 times the metallicity of the Sun (10^{+1}); conversely, those with a $\ \left[\tfrac{ \ce{Fe} }{ \ce{H} } \right]_\star\$ value of −1 have 1/10, while those with a $\ \left[\tfrac{ \ce{Fe} }{ \ce{H} } \right]_\star\$ value of 0 have the same metallicity as the Sun, and so on.

Young population I stars have significantly higher iron-to-hydrogen ratios than older population II stars. Primordial population III stars are estimated to have metallicity less than −6, a millionth of the abundance of iron in the Sun. The same notation is used to express variations in abundances between other individual elements as compared to solar proportions. For example, the notation $\ \left[\tfrac{ \ce{O} }{ \ce{Fe} } \right]\$ represents the difference in the logarithm of the star's oxygen abundance versus its iron content compared to that of the Sun. In general, a given stellar nucleosynthetic process alters the proportions of only a few elements or isotopes, so a star or gas sample with certain $\ \left[\tfrac{ \ce{?} }{ \ce{Fe} } \right]_\star\$ values may well be indicative of an associated, studied nuclear process.

=== Photometric colors ===
Astronomers can estimate metallicities through measured and calibrated systems that correlate photometric measurements and spectroscopic measurements (see also Spectrophotometry). For example, the Johnson UVB filters can be used to detect an ultraviolet (UV) excess in stars, where a smaller UV excess indicates a larger presence of metals that absorb the UV radiation, thereby making the star appear "redder". The UV excess, δ(U−B), is defined as the difference between a star's U and B band magnitudes, compared to the difference between U and B band magnitudes of metal-rich stars in the Hyades cluster. Unfortunately, δ(U−B) is sensitive to both metallicity and temperature: If two stars are equally metal-rich, but one is cooler than the other, they will likely have different δ(U−B) values (see also Blanketing effect). To help mitigate this degeneracy, a star's B−V color index can be used as an indicator for temperature. Furthermore, the UV excess and B−V index can be corrected to relate the δ(U−B) value to iron abundances.

Other photometric systems that can be used to determine metallicities of certain astrophysical objects include the Strӧmgren system, the Geneva system, the Washington system, and the DDO system.

== Metallicities in various astrophysical objects ==
=== Stars ===
At a given mass and age, a metal-poor star will be slightly warmer. Population II stars' metallicities are roughly 1/1000 to 1/10 of the Sun's $\left(\ \left[ \tfrac{ \ce{Fe} }{ \ce{H} } \right]\ = {-3.0}\ ...\ {-1.0}\ \right)\ ,$ but the group appears cooler than population I overall, as heavy population II stars have long since died. Above 40 solar masses, metallicity influences how a star will die: Outside the pair-instability window, lower metallicity stars will collapse directly to a black hole, while higher metallicity stars undergo a type Ib/c supernova and may leave a neutron star.

==== Relationship between stellar metallicity and planets ====
A star's metallicity measurement is one parameter that helps determine whether a star may have a giant planet, as there is a direct correlation between metallicity and the presence of a giant planet. Measurements have demonstrated the connection between a star's metallicity and gas giant planets, like Jupiter and Saturn. The more metals in a star and thus its planetary system and protoplanetary disk, the more likely the system may have gas giant planets. Current models show that the metallicity along with the correct planetary system temperature and distance from the star are key to planet and planetesimal formation. For two stars that have equal age and mass but different metallicity, the less metallic star is bluer. Among stars of the same color, less metallic stars emit more ultraviolet radiation. The Sun, with eight planets and nine consensus dwarf planets, is used as the reference, with a $\ \left[\tfrac{ \ce{Fe} }{ \ce{H} } \right]\$ of 0.00.

==== H II regions ====
Young, massive and hot stars (typically of spectral types O and B) in H II regions emit UV photons that ionize ground-state hydrogen atoms, knocking electrons free; this process is known as photoionization. The free electrons can strike other atoms nearby, exciting bound metallic electrons into a metastable state, which eventually decay back into a ground state, emitting photons with energies that correspond to forbidden lines. Through these transitions, astronomers have developed several observational methods to estimate metal abundances in H II regions, where the stronger the forbidden lines in spectroscopic observations, the higher the metallicity. These methods are dependent on one or more of the following: the variety of asymmetrical densities inside H II regions, the varied temperatures of the embedded stars, and/or the electron density within the ionized region.

Theoretically, to determine the total abundance of a single element in an H II region, all transition lines should be observed and summed. However, this can be observationally difficult due to variation in line strength. Some of the most common forbidden lines used to determine metal abundances in H II regions are from oxygen (e.g. [O^{II}] λ = (3727, 7318, 7324) Å, and [O^{III}] λ = (4363, 4959, 5007) Å), nitrogen (e.g. [N^{II}] λ = (5755, 6548, 6584) Å), and sulfur (e.g. [S^{II}] λ = (6717, 6731) Å and [S^{III}] λ = (6312, 9069, 9531) Å) in the optical spectrum, and the [O^{III}] λ = (52, 88) μm and [N^{III}] λ = 57 μm lines in the infrared spectrum. Oxygen has some of the stronger, more abundant lines in H II regions, making it a main target for metallicity estimates within these objects. To calculate metal abundances in H II regions using oxygen flux measurements, astronomers often use the R_{23} method, in which

$$R_{23} = \frac{\ \left[\ \ce{O}^\ce{II} \right]_{3727~\AA} + \left[\ \ce{O}^\ce{III} \right]_{4959~\AA + 5007~\AA}\ }{\left[\ \ce{ H}_\ce{\beta} \right]_{4861 ~\AA} }\ ,$$

where $\ \left[\ \ce{O}^\ce{II} \right]_{3727~\AA} + \left[\ \ce{O}^\ce{III} \right]_{4959~\AA + 5007~\AA}\$ is the sum of the fluxes from oxygen emission lines measured at the rest frame λ = (3727, 4959 and 5007) Å wavelengths, divided by the flux from the Balmer series H_{β} emission line at the rest frame λ = 4861 Å wavelength. This ratio is well defined through models and observational studies, but caution should be taken, as the ratio is often degenerate, providing both a low and high metallicity solution, which can be broken with additional line measurements. Similarly, other strong forbidden line ratios can be used, e.g. for sulfur, where

$$S_{23} = \frac{\ \left[\ \ce{S}^\ce{II} \right]_{6716~\AA + 6731~\AA} + \left[\ \ce{S}^\ce{III} \right]_{9069~\AA + 9532~\AA}\ }{\left[\ \ce{H}_\ce{\beta} \right]_{4861 ~\AA} } ~.$$

Metal abundances within H II regions are typically less than 1%, with the percentage decreasing on average with distance from the Galactic Center.

=== Metallicity calibrations at high redshift ===
The strong line methods that are described above were primarily calibrated on low-redshift galaxy samples. The James Webb Space Telescope (JWST) and its Near Infrared Spectrograph (NIRSpec) has enabled the measurement of spectroscopic metallicity at redshifts z ~ 4-10, which corresponds to the first two billion years of the cosmic timeline.

Most emission line ratios change substantially with redshift. This is due to a systematic increase in the ionization parameter of the interstellar medium in early galaxies. Because of this, applying typical $z \approx 0$ calibrations to high-redshift spectra can bias oxygen abundance estimates downward by up to 1 dex.

Deep observations with the JWST Advanced Deep Extragalactic Survey (JADES) looked at galaxies with z values between 3-10, including low-mass systems ($\log(\ M_\star/\ M_\odot)\lesssim 8)$ that had been unobservable from ground-based facilities.

== See also ==
- Cosmos Redshift 7, a galaxy that reportedly contains Population III stars
- Galaxy formation and evolution
- GRB 090423, the most distant seen, presumably from a low-metallicity progenitor
- Metallicity distribution function
- James Webb Space Telescope
