= ESO 325-4 =

Galaxy in the constellation Centaurus

ESO 325-G 004
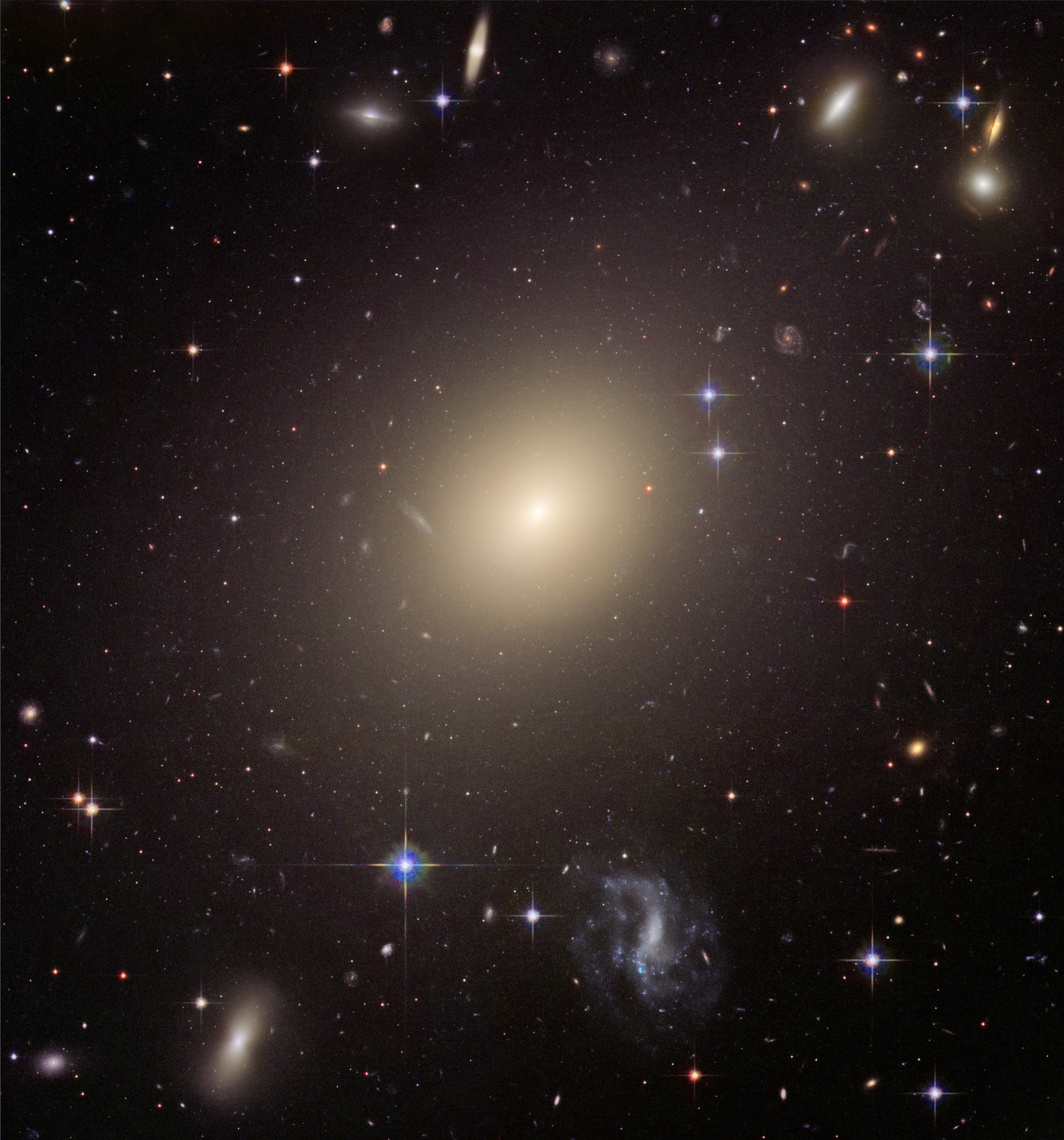
- Hubble Space Telescope image of ESO 325-G004

Observation data (J2000 epoch)
- Constellation: Centaurus
- Right ascension: 13^{h} 43^{m} 33^{s}
- Declination: −38° 10′ 33″
- Redshift: 0.033903±0.000028
- Distance: 200.8 ± 14.4 Mpc (654.9 ± 46.97 Mly)h^{−1}_{0.6774} (Note: The given distance in the overview of NED of 133 ± 8.718 megaparsecs (433.8 ± 28.43 million light-years) was based on an estimate using the Tully-Fischer relation. The distance estimate in this infobox was based on the galaxy's redshift.)
- Group or cluster: Abell S740
- Apparent magnitude (B): 13.89

Characteristics
- Type: E
- Size: 545,170 ly × 425,240 ly (167.15 kpc × 130.38 kpc) (diameter; ESO-IV D_{27.0} B-band isophote) (Note: The quick-look major axis physical diameters given by NED of 110.77 by 86.40 kiloparsecs (361,000 by 282,000 light-years) and 62.67 by 50.14 kiloparsecs (204,000 by 164,000 light-years) were based on a distance estimate of 133 ± 8.718 megaparsecs (433.8 ± 28.43 million light-years). The quoted diameters in this infobox was based on NED's provided scale "Virgo + GA + Shapley" of 973 pc/arcsec multiplied with the given angular diameters.); 308,500 ly × 246,800 ly (94.58 kpc × 75.66 kpc) (diameter; 2MASS K-band total isophote)

Other designations
- ESO 325-G004, 2MASX J13433318-3810336

ESO 325-4 (ESO 325-G 004) is an elliptical galaxy located approximately 416 million light-years away in the constellation Centaurus.

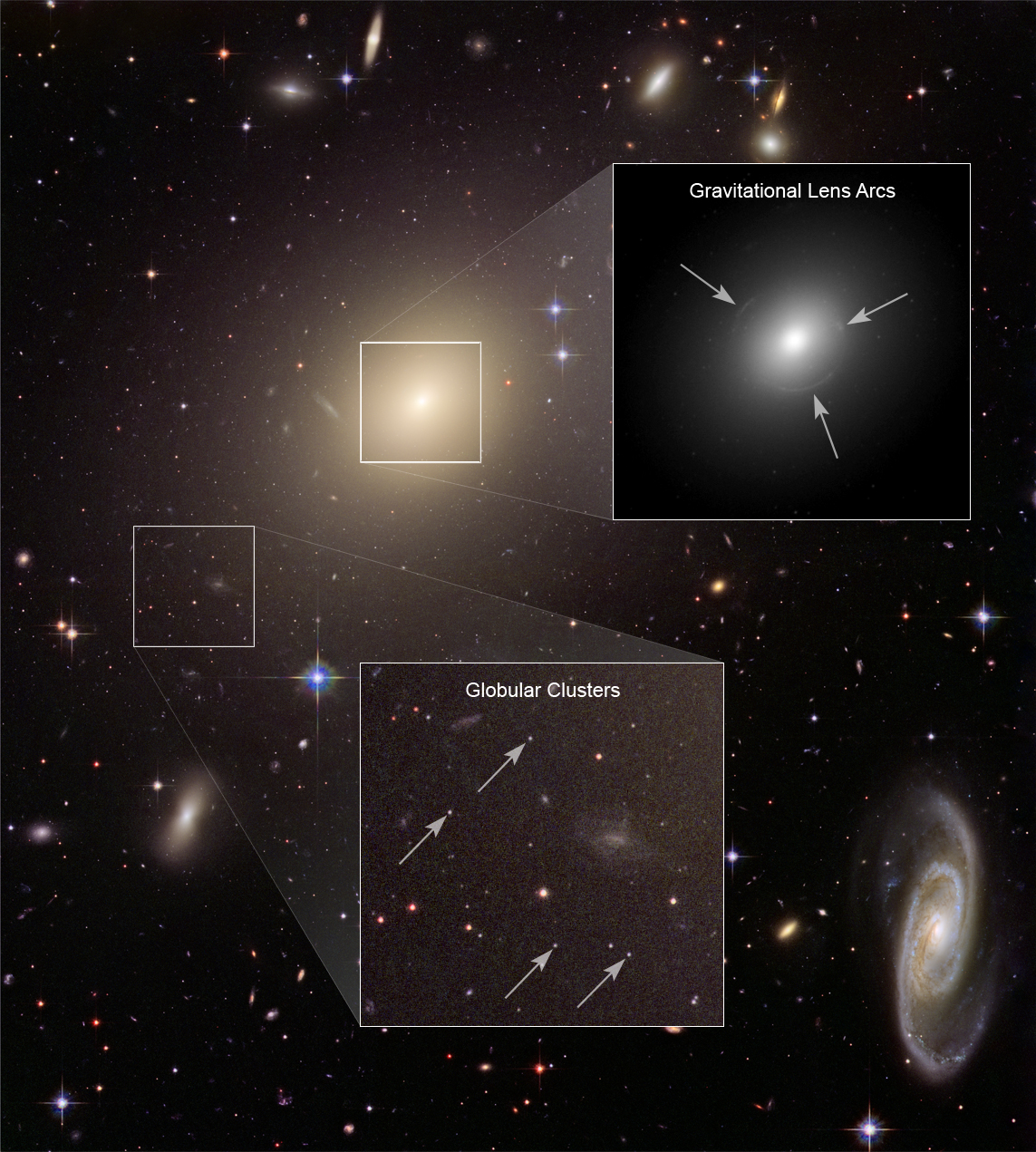
Galaxy cluster Abell S0740. The giant elliptical galaxy ESO 325-4 at the cluster's center. Hubble Space Telescope.

ESO 325-4 acts as a strong gravitational lens, bending the light of a background galaxy into arcs. In 2018, a combined analysis of the lensed arcs and the motions of the galaxy's own stars was used to test general relativity on galactic scales, measuring the spacetime curvature generated per unit mass as γ = 0.97 ± 0.09 — consistent with the value of exactly 1 predicted by Einstein, and at the time the most precise extragalactic test of general relativity.
