= NGC 3613 =

Elliptical galaxy in the constellation Ursa Major

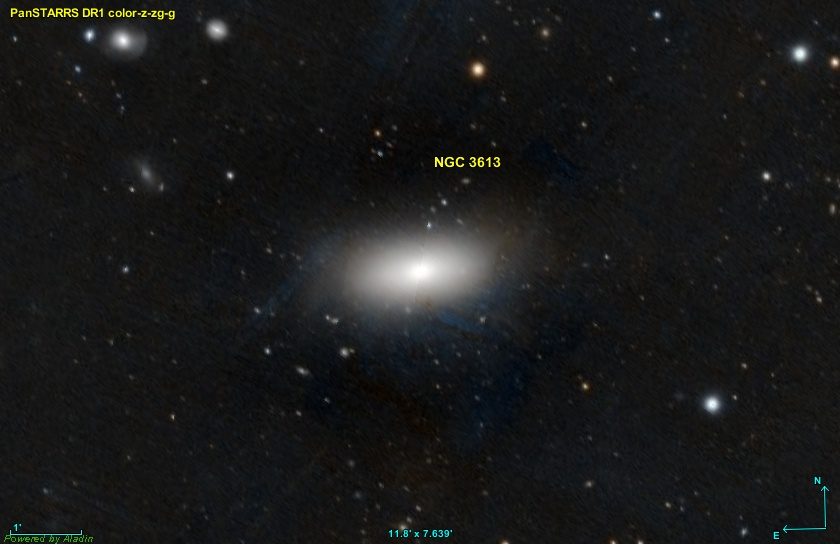
- Pan-STARRS image of NGC 3613

Observation data (J2000 epoch)
- Constellation: Ursa Major
- Right ascension: 11^{h} 18^{m} 36.130^{s}
- Declination: +57° 59′ 59.73″
- Redshift: 0.006738
- Heliocentric radial velocity: 2,013±47 km/s
- Distance: 98 Mly (30.1 Mpc)
- Apparent magnitude (V): 10.8
- Absolute magnitude (V): −21.5

Characteristics
- Type: E6
- Apparent size (V): 3.9′ × 1.1′

Other designations
- NGC 3613, UGC 6323, MCG +10-16-109, PGC 34583

NGC 3613 is an elliptical galaxy in the constellation Ursa Major. It was discovered by the Grman-British astronomer William Herschel on 8 April 1793. The galaxy has an apparent visual magnitude of 10.8 with an angular size of 3.9′ × 1.1′. It is located at a distance of 98 million light-years (30.1 Mpc). NGC 3613 is positioned at the center of a cluster of 12 galaxies that includes NGC 3610.

The morphological classification of NGC 3613 is E6, indicating an elliptical galaxy with a pronounced oval shape. It has an estimated globular cluster population of over 2,000 members. One supernova event has been observed in NGC 3613: SN 2011eh. This Type Ia-pec supernova was discovered by Masaki Tsuboi on 20 July 2011 and reached magnitude 16.2.
