= NGC 3610 =

Elliptical galaxy in the constellation Ursa Major

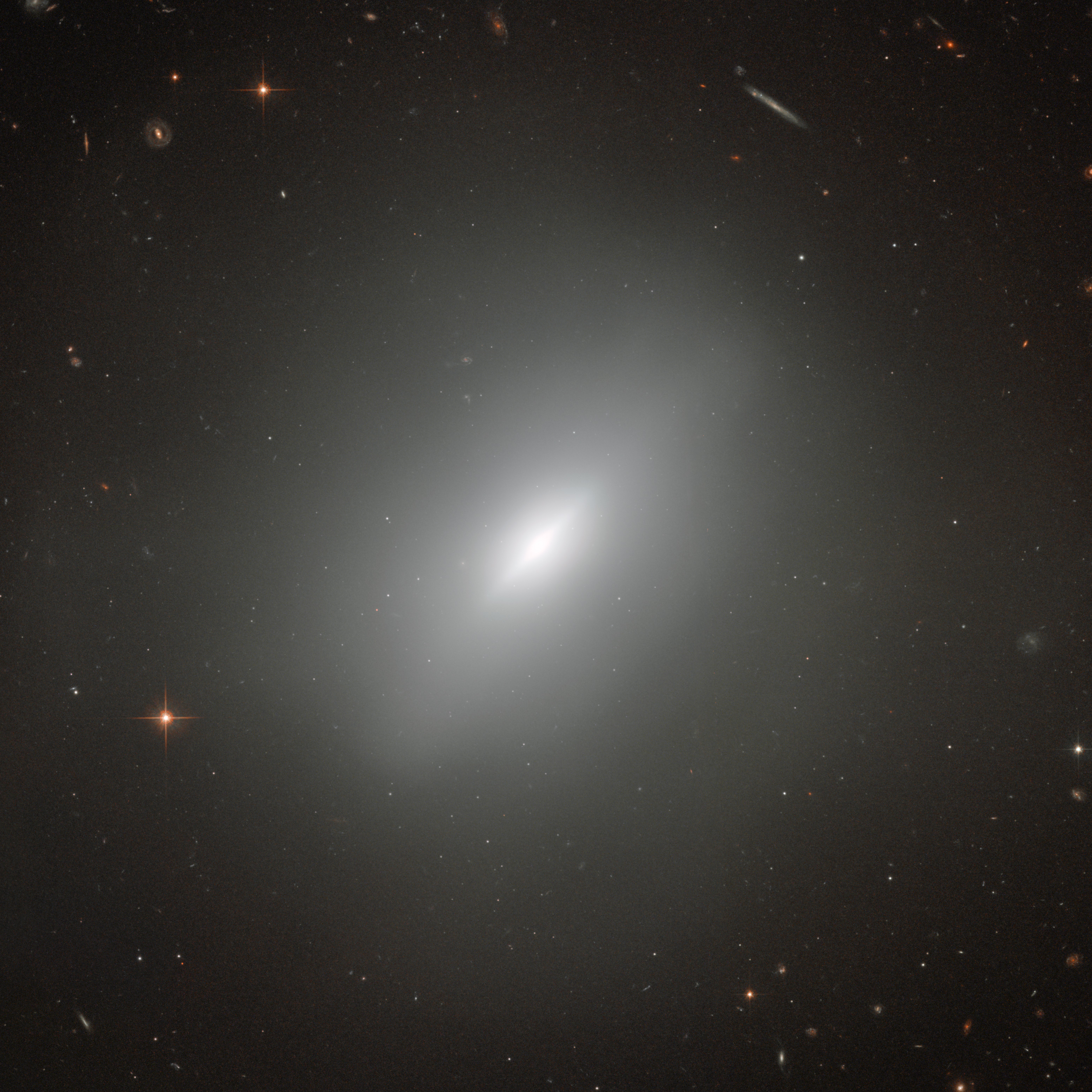
- Hubble Space Telescope image of NGC 3610, showing its disk

Observation data (J2000 epoch)
- Constellation: Ursa Major
- Right ascension: 11^{h} 18^{m} 25.276^{s}
- Declination: +58° 47′ 10.49″
- Redshift: 0.005694
- Heliocentric radial velocity: 1,732 km/s
- Galactocentric velocity: 1,819 km/s
- Distance: 106 Mly (32.5 Mpc)
- Apparent magnitude (V): 10.7
- Apparent magnitude (B): 11.63

Characteristics
- Type: E5:
- Mass: 1.01×10^{11} (stellar) M_{☉}
- Size: 76,800 ly (23,560 pc)
- Apparent size (V): 1.460′ × 1.168′ (NIR)

Other designations
- NGC 3610, UGC 6319, LEDA 34566, PGC 34566

NGC 3610 is an elliptical galaxy in the constellation Ursa Major. It was discovered on 8 April 1793 by German-British astronomer William Herschel. This galaxy is located at a distance of 106 million light-years (32.5 Mpc) from the Milky Way, and is receding with a galacto-centric radial velocity of 1,819 km/s.

NGC 3610 is a relatively young elliptical galaxy which has not yet lost its disk. It has a morphological classification of E5, indicating a 2:1 ratio between the major and minor axes of the elliptical profile. This is a candidate merger remnant of intermediate age, with a surviving disk of gas and dusk aligned with the major axis. This merger is estimated to have occurred 4±2.5 Gyr ago. The central part of the disk displays warping, and is significantly younger than the remainder of the galaxy.

The unusual amount of blue light emission of NGC 3610, or B–V in the UBV photometric system, suggests recent star formation. The current estimated star formation rate is 0.385±0.375 M_{☉}·yr^{−1}. There is a population of younger globular clusters orbiting the galaxy that is a likely product of the merger. The surviving population of older, metal-rich globular clusters suggests that at least one of the progenitor galaxies had a prominent bulge component.

== Gallery ==
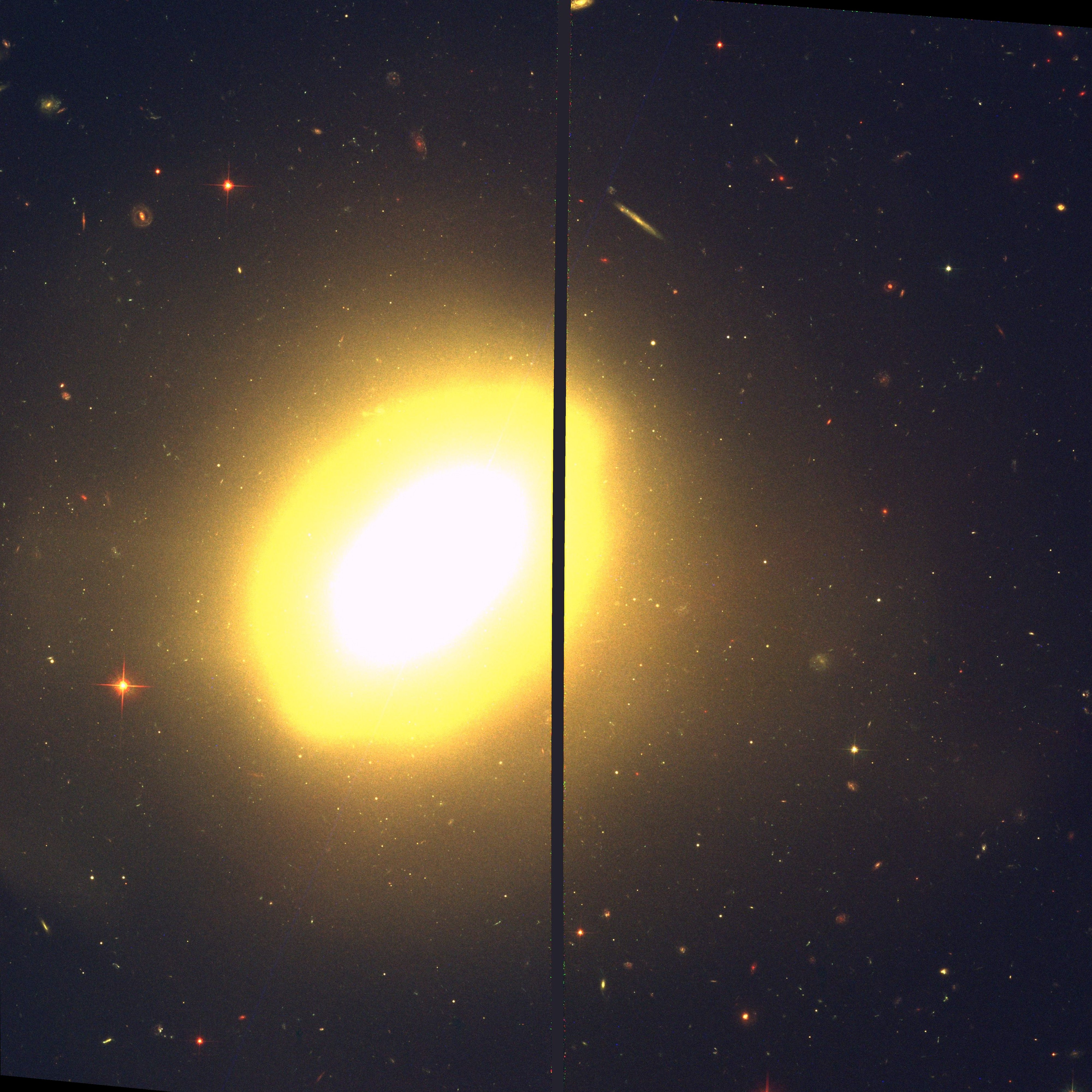
NGC 3610 by Hubble Space Telescope

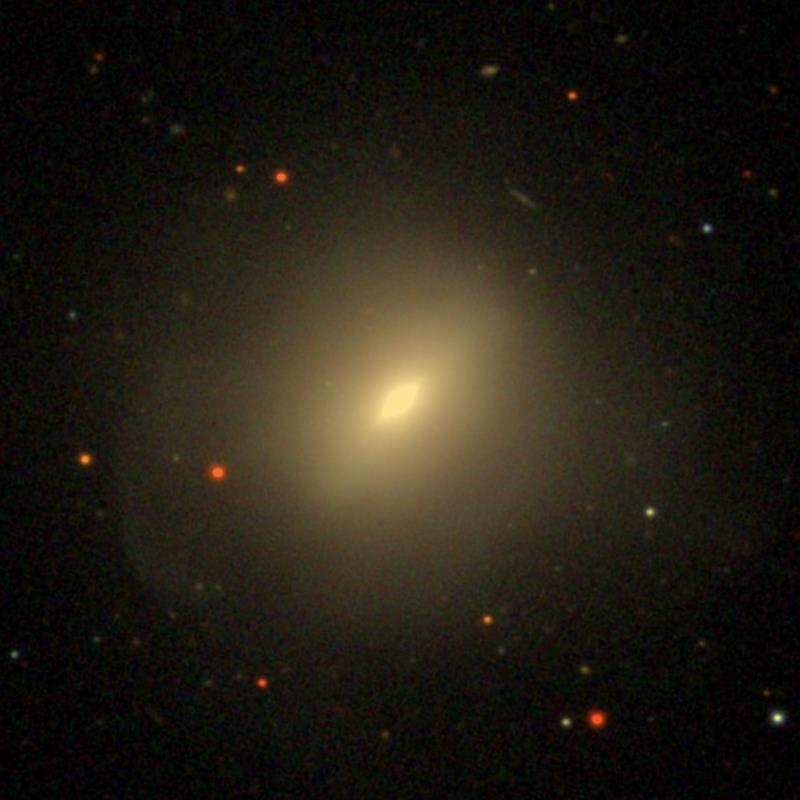
NGC 3610 (SDSS DR14)
