= Scorpius in Chinese astronomy =

The name of the IAU constellation Scorpius in modern Chinese is 天蝎座 (tiān xiē zuò).

In terms of traditional Chinese uranography, the modern constellation is located within the eastern quadrant of the sky, which is symbolized as the Azure Dragon of the East (東方青龍, Dōng Fāng Qīng Lóng) and includes the asterisms "Heart", "Room" and "Tail".

== Stars ==
The map of Chinese constellation in constellation Scorpius area consists of:

Four Symbols	Mansion (Chinese name)	Romanization	Translation	Asterisms (Chinese name)	Romanization	Translation	Western star name	Proper Name	Chinese star name	Romanization	Translation
Azure Dragon of the East (東方青龍)	房	Fáng	Room	房	Fáng	Room					
Azure Dragon of the East (東方青龍)	房	Fáng	Room	房	Fáng	Room	π Sco	Fang (for component Aa)			
Azure Dragon of the East (東方青龍)	房	Fáng	Room	房	Fáng	Room	π Sco	Fang (for component Aa)	房宿一	Fángsuyī	1st star
Azure Dragon of the East (東方青龍)	房	Fáng	Room	房	Fáng	Room	π Sco	Fang (for component Aa)	房宿距星	Fángsujùxīng	Separated star
Azure Dragon of the East (東方青龍)	房	Fáng	Room	房	Fáng	Room	π Sco	Fang (for component Aa)	房宿南第二星	Fángsunándìèrxīng	2nd southern star
Azure Dragon of the East (東方青龍)	房	Fáng	Room	房	Fáng	Room	π Sco	Fang (for component Aa)	左骖	Zuǒcān	Left-side horse of three horses
Azure Dragon of the East (東方青龍)	房	Fáng	Room	房	Fáng	Room	ρ Sco	Iklil (for component Aa)			
Azure Dragon of the East (東方青龍)	房	Fáng	Room	房	Fáng	Room	ρ Sco	Iklil (for component Aa)	房宿二	Fángsuèr	2nd star
Azure Dragon of the East (東方青龍)	房	Fáng	Room	房	Fáng	Room	ρ Sco	Iklil (for component Aa)	左服	Zuǒfú	Left-side clothes
Azure Dragon of the East (東方青龍)	房	Fáng	Room	房	Fáng	Room	δ Sco	Dschubba			
Azure Dragon of the East (東方青龍)	房	Fáng	Room	房	Fáng	Room	δ Sco	Dschubba	房宿三	Fángsusān	3rd star
Azure Dragon of the East (東方青龍)	房	Fáng	Room	房	Fáng	Room	δ Sco	Dschubba	房宿北第二星	Fángsuběidìèrxīng	2nd northern star
Azure Dragon of the East (東方青龍)	房	Fáng	Room	房	Fáng	Room	δ Sco	Dschubba	右服	Yòufú	Right-side clothes
Azure Dragon of the East (東方青龍)	房	Fáng	Room	房	Fáng	Room	β^{1} Sco and β^{2} Sco	Acrab			
Azure Dragon of the East (東方青龍)	房	Fáng	Room	房	Fáng	Room	β^{1} Sco and β^{2} Sco	Acrab	房宿四	Fángsusì	4th star
Azure Dragon of the East (東方青龍)	房	Fáng	Room	房	Fáng	Room	β^{1} Sco and β^{2} Sco	Acrab	房宿北第一星	Fángsuběidìyīxīng	1st northern star
Azure Dragon of the East (東方青龍)	房	Fáng	Room	房	Fáng	Room	β^{1} Sco and β^{2} Sco	Acrab	房星	Fángxīng	Star of room
Azure Dragon of the East (東方青龍)	房	Fáng	Room	房	Fáng	Room	β^{1} Sco and β^{2} Sco	Acrab	右骖	Yòucān	Right-side horse of three horses
Azure Dragon of the East (東方青龍)	房	Fáng	Room	房	Fáng	Room	1 Sco		房宿增四	Fángsuzēngsì	4th additional star
Azure Dragon of the East (東方青龍)	房	Fáng	Room	房	Fáng	Room	2 Sco		房宿增五	Fángsuzēngwǔ	5th additional star
Azure Dragon of the East (東方青龍)	房	Fáng	Room	房	Fáng	Room	4 Sco		房宿增六	Fángsuzēngliù	6th additional star
Azure Dragon of the East (東方青龍)	房	Fáng	Room	鉤鈐	Gōuqián	Lock					
Azure Dragon of the East (東方青龍)	房	Fáng	Room	鉤鈐	Gōuqián	Lock	ω^{1} Sco				
Azure Dragon of the East (東方青龍)	房	Fáng	Room	鉤鈐	Gōuqián	Lock	ω^{1} Sco		鉤鈐一	Gōuqiányī	1st star
Azure Dragon of the East (東方青龍)	房	Fáng	Room	鉤鈐	Gōuqián	Lock	ω^{1} Sco		鉤鈐西星	Gōuqiánxīxīng	Western star
Azure Dragon of the East (東方青龍)	房	Fáng	Room	鉤鈐	Gōuqián	Lock	ω^{2} Sco		鉤鈐二	Gōuqiánèr	2nd star
Azure Dragon of the East (東方青龍)	房	Fáng	Room	鍵閉	Jiànbì	Door Bolt					
Azure Dragon of the East (東方青龍)	房	Fáng	Room	鍵閉	Jiànbì	Door Bolt	ν Sco	Jabbah (for component Aa)			
Azure Dragon of the East (東方青龍)	房	Fáng	Room	鍵閉	Jiànbì	Door Bolt	ν Sco	Jabbah (for component Aa)	鍵閉	Jiànbì	(One star of)
Azure Dragon of the East (東方青龍)	房	Fáng	Room	鍵閉	Jiànbì	Door Bolt	ν Sco	Jabbah (for component Aa)	天鍵	Tiānjiàn	Celestial door bolt
Azure Dragon of the East (東方青龍)	房	Fáng	Room	鍵閉	Jiànbì	Door Bolt	ν Sco	Jabbah (for component Aa)	天心	Tiānxīn	Celestial heart
Azure Dragon of the East (東方青龍)	房	Fáng	Room	罰	Fá	Punishment					
Azure Dragon of the East (東方青龍)	房	Fáng	Room	罰	Fá	Punishment	18 Sco		罰一	Fáyī	1st star
Azure Dragon of the East (東方青龍)	房	Fáng	Room	罰	Fá	Punishment	11 Sco		罰二	Fáèr	2nd star
Azure Dragon of the East (東方青龍)	房	Fáng	Room	罰	Fá	Punishment	16 Sco		罰增一	Fázēngyī	1st additional star
Azure Dragon of the East (東方青龍)	房	Fáng	Room	罰	Fá	Punishment	ψ Sco		罰增二	Fázēngèr	2nd additional star
Azure Dragon of the East (東方青龍)	房	Fáng	Room	西咸	Xīxián	Western Door	ξ Sco		西咸一	Xīxiányī	1st star
Azure Dragon of the East (東方青龍)	心	Xīn	Heart	心	Xīn	Heart					
Azure Dragon of the East (東方青龍)	心	Xīn	Heart	心	Xīn	Heart	σ Sco	Alniyat (for component Aa1)			
Azure Dragon of the East (東方青龍)	心	Xīn	Heart	心	Xīn	Heart	σ Sco	Alniyat (for component Aa1)	心宿一	Xīnsuyī	1st star
Azure Dragon of the East (東方青龍)	心	Xīn	Heart	心	Xīn	Heart	σ Sco	Alniyat (for component Aa1)	心宿距星	Xīnsujùxīng	Separated star
Azure Dragon of the East (東方青龍)	心	Xīn	Heart	心	Xīn	Heart	σ Sco	Alniyat (for component Aa1)	心宿太子	Xīnsutàizǐ	Big in "heart"
Azure Dragon of the East (東方青龍)	心	Xīn	Heart	心	Xīn	Heart	σ Sco	Alniyat (for component Aa1)	心前星	Xīnqiánxīng	Front star
Azure Dragon of the East (東方青龍)	心	Xīn	Heart	心	Xīn	Heart	α Sco	Antares			
Azure Dragon of the East (東方青龍)	心	Xīn	Heart	心	Xīn	Heart	α Sco	Antares	心宿二	Xīnsuèr	2nd star
Azure Dragon of the East (東方青龍)	心	Xīn	Heart	心	Xīn	Heart	α Sco	Antares	心宿中星	Xīnsuzhōngxīng	Central star
Azure Dragon of the East (東方青龍)	心	Xīn	Heart	心	Xīn	Heart	α Sco	Antares	心星	Xīnxīng	Star of heart
Azure Dragon of the East (東方青龍)	心	Xīn	Heart	心	Xīn	Heart	α Sco	Antares	心大星	Xīndàxīng	Big star
Azure Dragon of the East (東方青龍)	心	Xīn	Heart	心	Xīn	Heart	α Sco	Antares	大火	Dàhuǒ	Great flame
Azure Dragon of the East (東方青龍)	心	Xīn	Heart	心	Xīn	Heart	α Sco	Antares	火	Huǒ	The flame
Azure Dragon of the East (東方青龍)	心	Xīn	Heart	心	Xīn	Heart	α Sco	Antares	辰	Chén	5th earthly branch
Azure Dragon of the East (東方青龍)	心	Xīn	Heart	心	Xīn	Heart	α Sco	Antares	商星	Shāngxīng	Commerce star
Azure Dragon of the East (東方青龍)	心	Xīn	Heart	心	Xīn	Heart	α Sco	Antares	天王	Tiānwáng	Celestial king
Azure Dragon of the East (東方青龍)	心	Xīn	Heart	心	Xīn	Heart	α Sco	Antares	辰龙	Chénlóng	Dragon of 5th earthly branch
Azure Dragon of the East (東方青龍)	心	Xīn	Heart	心	Xīn	Heart	α Sco	Antares	青龙星	Qīnglóngxīng	Star of azure dragon
Azure Dragon of the East (東方青龍)	心	Xīn	Heart	心	Xīn	Heart	α Sco	Antares	龙星	Lóngxīng	Star of dragon
Azure Dragon of the East (東方青龍)	心	Xīn	Heart	心	Xīn	Heart	α Sco	Antares	农星	Nóngxīng	Star for agriculture
Azure Dragon of the East (東方青龍)	心	Xīn	Heart	心	Xīn	Heart	α Sco	Antares	閼伯之星	Ebózhīxīng	
Azure Dragon of the East (東方青龍)	心	Xīn	Heart	心	Xīn	Heart	τ Sco	Paikauhale			
Azure Dragon of the East (東方青龍)	心	Xīn	Heart	心	Xīn	Heart	τ Sco	Paikauhale	心宿三	Xīnsusān	3rd star
Azure Dragon of the East (東方青龍)	心	Xīn	Heart	心	Xīn	Heart	τ Sco	Paikauhale	心宿庶子	Xīnsushùzǐ	Numerous in "heart"
Azure Dragon of the East (東方青龍)	心	Xīn	Heart	心	Xīn	Heart	τ Sco	Paikauhale	心後星	Xīnhòuxīng	Hind star
Azure Dragon of the East (東方青龍)	心	Xīn	Heart	心	Xīn	Heart	τ Sco	Paikauhale	心宿后星	Xīnsuhòuxīng	"Queen" star
Azure Dragon of the East (東方青龍)	心	Xīn	Heart	心	Xīn	Heart	12 Sco		心宿增一	Xīnsuzēngyī	1st additional star
Azure Dragon of the East (東方青龍)	心	Xīn	Heart	心	Xīn	Heart	13 Sco		心宿增二	Xīnsuzēngèr	2nd additional star
Azure Dragon of the East (東方青龍)	心	Xīn	Heart	心	Xīn	Heart	ο Sco		心宿增三	Xīnsuzēngsān	3rd additional star
Azure Dragon of the East (東方青龍)	心	Xīn	Heart	心	Xīn	Heart	22 Sco		心宿增五	Xīnsuzēngwǔ	5th additional star
Azure Dragon of the East (東方青龍)	心	Xīn	Heart	心	Xīn	Heart	25 Sco		心宿增八	Xīnsuzēngjiǔ	9th additional star
Azure Dragon of the East (東方青龍)	尾	Wěi	Tail	尾	Wěi	Tail					
Azure Dragon of the East (東方青龍)	尾	Wěi	Tail	尾	Wěi	Tail	μ^{1} Sco	Xamidimura (for component Aa)			
Azure Dragon of the East (東方青龍)	尾	Wěi	Tail	尾	Wěi	Tail	μ^{1} Sco	Xamidimura (for component Aa)	尾宿一	Wěisuyī	1st star
Azure Dragon of the East (東方青龍)	尾	Wěi	Tail	尾	Wěi	Tail	μ^{1} Sco	Xamidimura (for component Aa)	尾宿距星	Wěisujùxīng	Separated star
Azure Dragon of the East (東方青龍)	尾	Wěi	Tail	尾	Wěi	Tail	μ^{1} Sco	Xamidimura (for component Aa)	尾宿西第二星	Wěisuxīdìèrxīng	2nd western star
Azure Dragon of the East (東方青龍)	尾	Wěi	Tail	尾	Wěi	Tail	ε Sco	Larawag			
Azure Dragon of the East (東方青龍)	尾	Wěi	Tail	尾	Wěi	Tail	ε Sco	Larawag	尾宿二	Wěisuèr	2nd star
Azure Dragon of the East (東方青龍)	尾	Wěi	Tail	尾	Wěi	Tail	ε Sco	Larawag	尾宿西第一星	Wěisuxīdìyīxīng	1st western star
Azure Dragon of the East (東方青龍)	尾	Wěi	Tail	尾	Wěi	Tail	ε Sco	Larawag	酒旗	Jiǔqí	Banner of a wine shop
Azure Dragon of the East (東方青龍)	尾	Wěi	Tail	尾	Wěi	Tail	ζ^{1} Sco and ζ^{2} Sco		尾宿三	Wěisusān	3rd star
Azure Dragon of the East (東方青龍)	尾	Wěi	Tail	尾	Wěi	Tail	η Sco		尾宿四	Wěisusì	4th star
Azure Dragon of the East (東方青龍)	尾	Wěi	Tail	尾	Wěi	Tail	θ Sco	Sargas (for component A)	尾宿五	Wěisuwǔ	5th star
Azure Dragon of the East (東方青龍)	尾	Wěi	Tail	尾	Wěi	Tail	ι^{1} Sco and ι^{2} Sco		尾宿六	Wěisuliù	6th star
Azure Dragon of the East (東方青龍)	尾	Wěi	Tail	尾	Wěi	Tail	κ Sco				
Azure Dragon of the East (東方青龍)	尾	Wěi	Tail	尾	Wěi	Tail	κ Sco		尾宿七	Wěisuqī	7th star
Azure Dragon of the East (東方青龍)	尾	Wěi	Tail	尾	Wěi	Tail	κ Sco		三师	Sānshī	Three masters
Azure Dragon of the East (東方青龍)	尾	Wěi	Tail	尾	Wěi	Tail	λ Sco	Shaula	尾宿八	Wěisubā	8th star
Azure Dragon of the East (東方青龍)	尾	Wěi	Tail	尾	Wěi	Tail	υ Sco	Lesath	尾宿九	Wěisujiǔ	9th star
Azure Dragon of the East (東方青龍)	尾	Wěi	Tail	尾	Wěi	Tail	27 Sco		尾宿增一	Wěisuzēngyī	1st additional star
Azure Dragon of the East (東方青龍)	尾	Wěi	Tail	尾	Wěi	Tail	μ^{2} Sco	Pipirima	尾宿增二	Wěisuzēngèr	2nd additional star
Azure Dragon of the East (東方青龍)	尾	Wěi	Tail	尾	Wěi	Tail	Q Sco		尾宿增三	Wěisuzēngsān	3rd additional star
Azure Dragon of the East (東方青龍)	尾	Wěi	Tail	尾	Wěi	Tail	HD 162391		尾宿增四	Wěisuzēngsì	4th additional star
Azure Dragon of the East (東方青龍)	尾	Wěi	Tail	神宮	Shéngōng	Changing Room	NGC 6231		神宮	Shéngōng	(One star of)
Azure Dragon of the East (東方青龍)	尾	Wěi	Tail	傅說	Fùyuè	Fuyue	G Sco	Fuyue	傅說	Fuyue	(One star of)
Azure Dragon of the East (東方青龍)	尾	Wěi	Tail	魚	Yú	Fish					
Azure Dragon of the East (東方青龍)	尾	Wěi	Tail	魚	Yú	Fish	M7				
Azure Dragon of the East (東方青龍)	尾	Wěi	Tail	魚	Yú	Fish	M7		魚	Yú	(One star of)
Azure Dragon of the East (東方青龍)	尾	Wěi	Tail	魚	Yú	Fish	M7		魚星	Yúxīng	Star of fish

== See also ==
- Chinese astronomy
- Traditional Chinese star names
- Chinese constellations
