= SN 393 =

Possible supernova in 393 AD and it is in Scorpius

Supernova SN 393
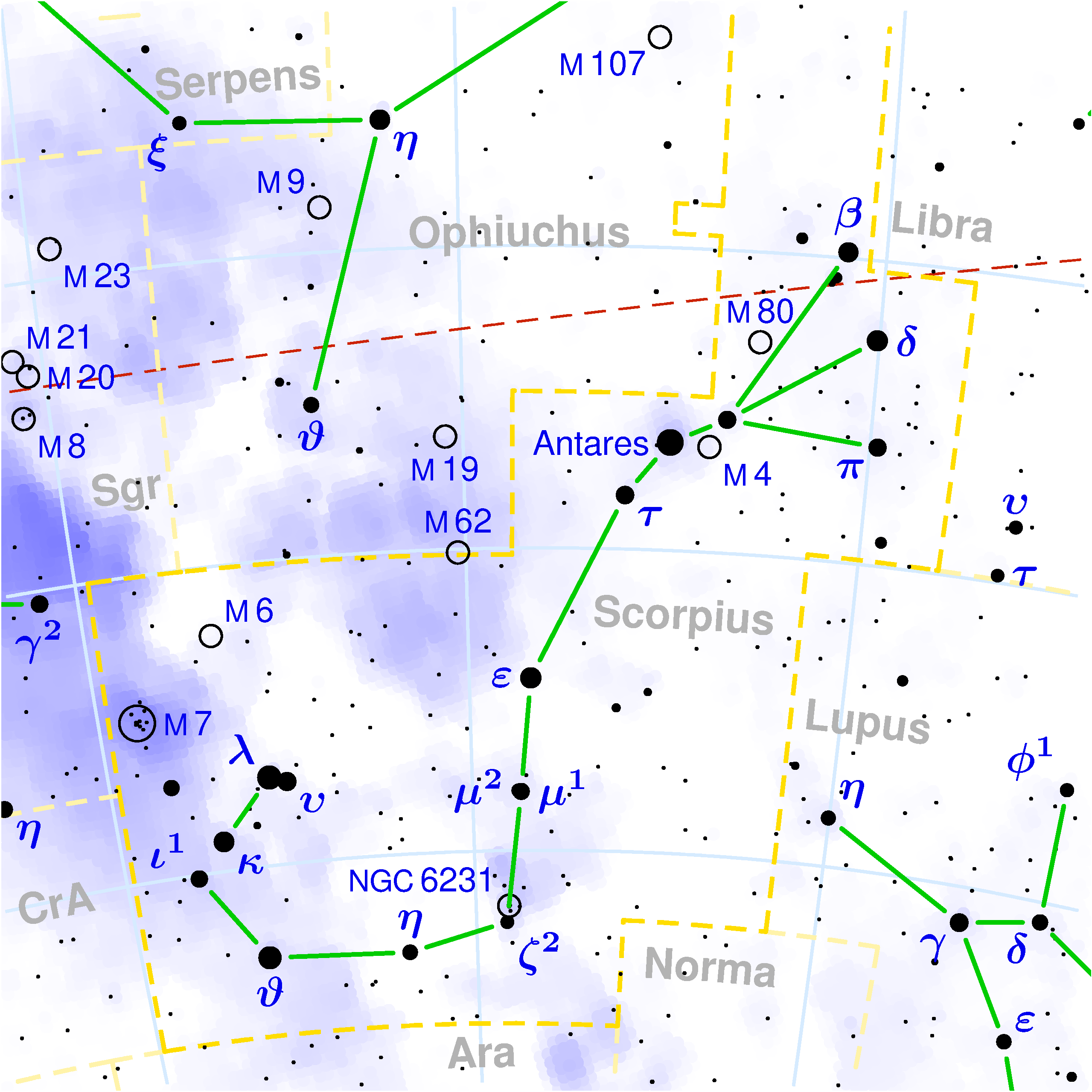
- The Wěi asterism appears in the lower half of the Scorpius constellation
- Event type: Supernova
- Type II/Ib
- Date: 27 February− 28 March 393; 22 October− 19 November 393 CE
- Constellation: Scorpius
- Right ascension: 17^{h} 14^{m}
- Declination: −39.8°
- Epoch: J2000
- Galactic coordinates: G347.4−00.6°
- Distance: 1 kpc (3×10^{3} ly)
- Remnant: Shell
- Host: Milky Way
- Peak apparent magnitude: −1
- Other designations: SN 393
- Preceded by: SN 386
- Followed by: SN 1006

SN 393 is the modern designation for a probable supernova that was reported by the Chinese in the year 393 CE.

== Contemporary records ==
An extracted record of this astronomical event was translated into English as follows:

A guest star appeared within the asterism Wěi during the second lunar month of the 18th year of the Tai-Yuan reign period, and disappeared during the ninth lunar month.

— Shen Yue, Song Shu

The second lunar month mentioned in the record corresponds to the period 27 February to 28 March 393 CE, while the ninth lunar month ran from 22 October to 19 November 393 CE. The bowl-shaped asterism named Wěi is formed by the tail of the modern constellation Scorpius. This asterism consists of the stars in Scorpius designated ε, μ, ζ, η, θ, ι, κ, λ and ν.

The guest star reached an estimated apparent magnitude of −1 and was visible for about eight months before fading from sight, whose lengthy duration suggests the source was a supernova. However, a classical nova is not excluded as possibility.

== Suggested as supernova ==
Before 1975, the observation made by the Chinese between February and March 393 CE was considered to be likely a bright nova with a secondary maximum. At the time, there were only seven possible candidate supernova remnants near where SN 393 was observed. Assuming maximum –1 magnitude occurred close to 10,000 pc (33,000 ly) away, this immediately ruled out four possible candidates. Another discounted remnant was G350.0-1.8, as the expectant expansion rate indicated the supernova occurred around 8,000 years ago. Of the two remaining sources, G348.5+0.1 and G348.7+0.3, were both at the required 10,000 pc. distance and also each had estimated ages of 1,500 years. If true, it seems unlikely such supernovae would be visible to the naked eye over eight months, especially because they occurred close to a particularly dusty part of the galactic plane.

Stephenson and his colleagues preferred the supernova suggestion. In their most recent book and subsequent articles, Stephenson and Green refer to the suggestion by Wang et al. (1997) who suggested G347.3–00.5.

== Suggested as classical nova ==
The decline time of classical novae is measured typically as the duration of decline by 3 mag from peak. This so-called t_{3} time ranges from typical 25–30 days (a month or two) for fast novae up to ten months for the slowest known classical novae (and even longer for diffusion induced novae). Thus, this historical transient could easily have been caused by a (slow) classical nova: postulating a peak brightness of (at least) 2 mag for the historical sighting and vanishing to invisibility (>5 mag) within 8 months, it could be a slow nova. The brighter the peak, the faster the nova: if the peak was −1 mag (like Sirius) or −4 (like Venus) and declined to >5 mag within eight months (6 mag or more in eight months) it could also refer to a moderately fast nova. Possible (and certainly not the only) candidates in the Chinese constellation of Wei are according to:

Suggested classical nova counterparts for 393
V643 Sco	a Z Cam-type dwarf nova
IGR J17195–4100	intermediate polar

== Possible confirmation of SN 393 ==
During 1996, the ROSAT All Sky Survey discovered another nearby supernova remnant, RX J1713.7-3946, which two years later was suggested as a better match for SN 393. Observations in 1999 suggested that this remnant was associated with a H II region, G347.611 +0.204, whose distance was about 6,000 pc (20,000 ly), but examining interactions between a nearby molecular cloud and the expanding remnant in 2003 found the closer distance of around 1,000 pc (3,000 ly). In 2004 measures of the degree of X-ray and neutral hydrogen absorption by intervening matter between the remnant and Earth confirmed this closer distance, making the true physical remnant diameter as 20 pc (65 ly) assuming the apparent angular diameter of about 1.2° or 70 arcminutes.

Supernova remnant RX J1713.7-3946 is consistent with type II or type Ib supernovae. SN 393's progenitor had a mass of at least 15 solar masses, whose destruction generated energies of about 1.3 × 10^{51} erg, with three solar masses of material ejected into the surrounding interstellar medium.

== See also ==
- Chinese astronomy
- Chinese constellations
