= Mula (nakshatra) =

19th lunar mansion of Hindu astronomy

Mūla ('root'; Devanagari मूल/मूळ, Kannada: ಮೂಲ, Telugu: మూల, Tamil: மூலம்) is the 19th of the 27 nakshatras in Indian Vedic Astrology.The symbol of Mula is a bunch of roots tied together (reticulated roots) or an 'elephant goad' (ankusha). It corresponds to a group of stars in the tail of Scorpius: at least ε, μ, ζ, η, θ, ι, κ, and λ Scorpii. These stars are in the direction of the Galactic Center, the brightest part of the Milky Way; this may be the source of the name Mula, referring to the central Milky Way looking like a root or tuber.

Red is considered an auspicious or supportive secondary color for Moola Nakshatra, often combined with earth tones, black, or golden hues.

== Astrology ==
Moola nakshatra is ruled by the Goddess of destruction, i.e. Goddess Maha Kali. The deity associated with it is Niriti, the god of dissolution, loss, chaos and deep transformation. She symbolises the force that transforms destruction and choas paving way to new truth and new beginnings.The Lord of Mula is Ketu it's energy is detachment that strips away illusions, ego, and external validation rather than building material desires. .
