= Q Scorpii =

High proper motion binary star system in the constellation of Scorpius

- Location of Q Scorpii on the map (circled)

Observation data Epoch J2000.0 Equinox J2000.0 (ICRS)
- Constellation: Scorpius
- Right ascension: 17^{h} 36^{m} 32.85514^{s}
- Declination: −38° 38′ 06.8918″
- Apparent magnitude (V): 4.27±0.01

Characteristics
- Evolutionary stage: horizontal branch
- Spectral type: K0 IIIb
- U−B color index: +0.90
- B−V color index: +1.08

Astrometry
Radial velocity (R_{v})	−49±3 km/s
Proper motion (μ)	RA: −16.762 mas/yr Dec.: −218.275 mas/yr
Parallax (π)	20.6922±0.2161 mas
Distance	158 ± 2 ly (48.3 ± 0.5 pc)
Absolute magnitude (M_{V})	+0.67

Details
Mass	1.10±0.07 M_{☉}
Radius	12.39±0.47 R_{☉}
Luminosity	62.2±4.2 L_{☉}
Surface gravity (log g)	2.41±0.11 cgs
Temperature	4,605±40 K
Metallicity [Fe/H]	−0.28±0.02 dex
Rotational velocity (v sin i)	<1 km/s

Other designations
- Q Scorpii, 159 G. Scorpii, CD−38°12044, CPD−38°6933, GC 23846, HD 159433, HIP 86170, HR 6546, SAO 209019

Database references
SIMBAD	data

Q Scorpii, also designated as HD 159433, is an astrometric binary (100% chance) located in the southern zodiac constellation Scorpius. It has an apparent magnitude of 4.27, making it readily visible to the naked eye under ideal conditions. It lies in the tail of Scorpius, between the stars κ Scorpii and υ Scorpii and is located 7′ away from the faint globular cluster Tonantzintla 2. Based on parallax measurements from Gaia DR3, the system is estimated to be 158 light years distant, but is approaching the Solar System with a heliocentric radial velocity of −49 km/s.

The visible component is a red giant with a stellar classification of K0 IIIb. The IIIb luminosity class indicates that it is a lower luminosity giant star. Q Scorpii is a red clump star located on the cool end of the horizontal branch, fusing helium at its core. It has 110% the mass of the Sun but has expanded to 12.4 times its girth. It radiates 62 times the luminosity of the Sun from its photosphere at an effective temperature of 4,605 K, giving it an orange hue. Q Scorpii has an iron abundance half of the Sun's, making it metal deficient. Like most giant stars, it spins slowly, having a projected rotational velocity lower than 1 km/s.
