= Shengong =

Shengong may refer to:

- A posthumous name of Kublai Khan
- A Chinese star name, which may refer to:
  - HD 153072 (adopted by the IAU)
  - Mu2 Scorpii
  - NGC 6231
