= Mu1 Scorpii =

Binary star system in the constellation Scorpius

μ^{1} Scorpii
- Location of μ^{1} Scorpii (circled)

Observation data Epoch J2000 Equinox ICRS
- Constellation: Scorpius
- Right ascension: 16^{h} 51^{m} 52.23111^{s}
- Declination: −38° 02′ 50.5694″
- Apparent magnitude (V): 2.94 - 3.22

Characteristics
- Spectral type: B1.5 V + B6.5 V
- U−B color index: −0.859
- B−V color index: −0.202
- Variable type: β Lyr

Astrometry
Radial velocity (R_{v})	−25 km/s
Proper motion (μ)	RA: −10.58 mas/yr Dec.: −22.06 mas/yr
Parallax (π)	6.51±0.91 mas
Distance	approx. 500 ly (approx. 150 pc)
Absolute magnitude (M_{V})	−2.9±0.3

Orbit
Period (P)	1.44627 days
Semi-major axis (a)	12.90±0.04 R_{☉}
Eccentricity (e)	0.0
Inclination (i)	65.4±1°
Periastron epoch (T)	2412374.434 HJD

Details

μ^{1} Sco A
Mass	8.3±1.0 M_{☉}
Radius	3.9±0.2 R_{☉}
Surface gravity (log g)	4.17±0.10 cgs
Temperature	24,000±1,000 K
Rotational velocity (v sin i)	191.5 km/s

μ^{1} Sco B
Mass	4.6±1.0 M_{☉}
Radius	4.6±0.3 R_{☉}
Surface gravity (log g)	3.77±0.12 cgs
Temperature	17,000±700 K
Rotational velocity (v sin i)	165.0 km/s

Other designations
- Xamidimura, CD−37°11033, FK5 1439, HD 151890, HIP 82514, HR 6247, SAO 208102, WDS 16519-3803

Database references
SIMBAD	data

Mu^{1} Scorpii (μ^{1} Scorpii, abbreviated Mu^{1} Sco, μ^{1} Sco) is a binary star system in the southern zodiac constellation of Scorpius. The combined apparent visual magnitude of the pair is about magnitude 3, making it one of the brighter members of Scorpius. Based upon parallax measurements, the distance of this system from the Sun is roughly 500 light-years (150 parsecs). This system is a member of the Scorpius–Centaurus association, the nearest OB association of co-moving stars to the Sun.

The primary (Mu^{1} Scorpii Aa) is formally named Xamidimura /ˌkæmidiˈmʊərə/, from the Khoekhoe xami di mûra [xami ti mũːɾa] 'the (two) eyes of the lion'.

== Properties ==
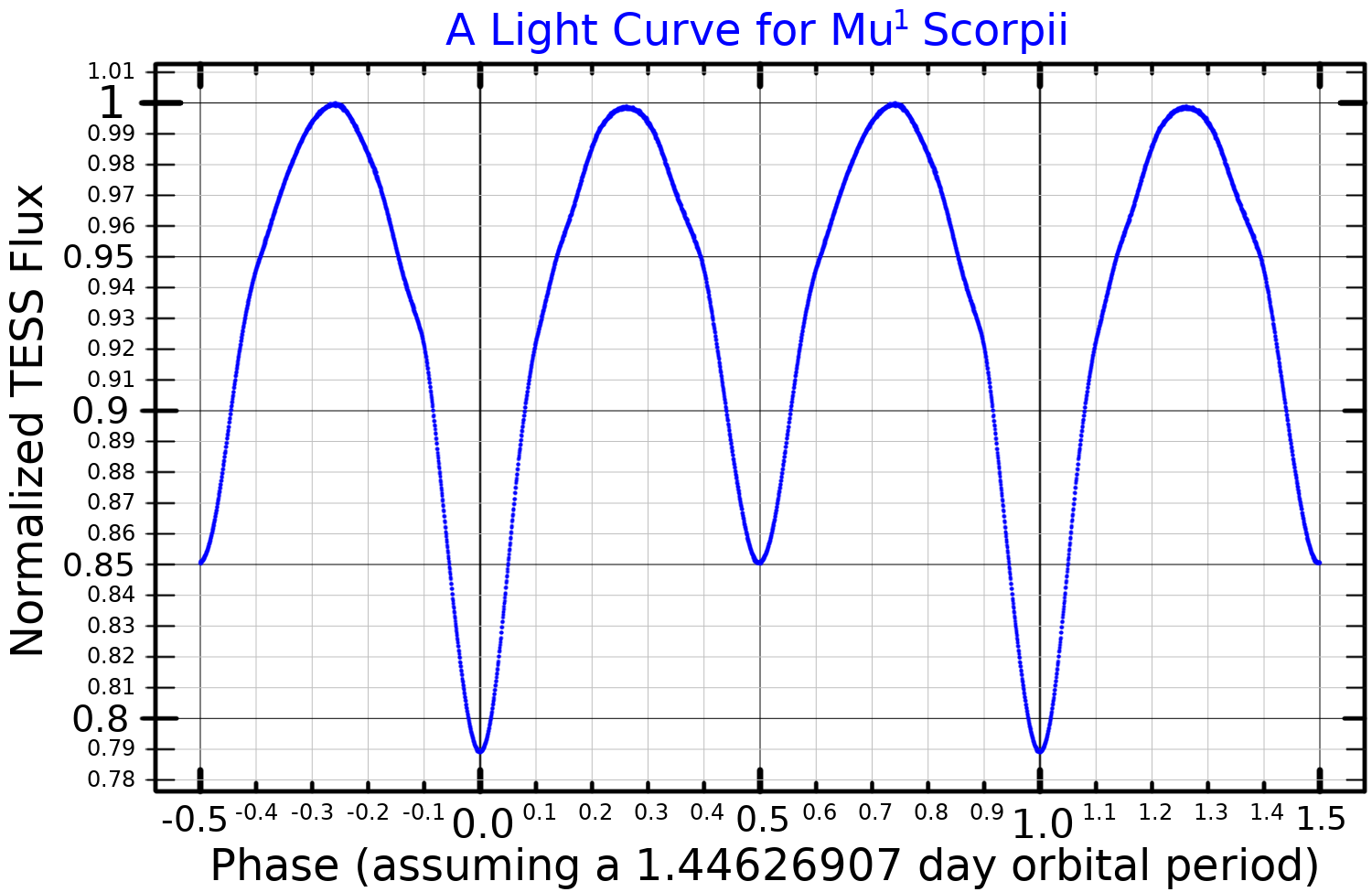
A light curve for Mu^{1} Scorpii, plotted from TESS data

Mu^{1} Scorpii is an eclipsing binary of the Beta Lyrae type. Discovered to be a spectroscopic binary by Solon Irving Bailey in 1896, it was only the third such eclipsing pair to be discovered. This is a semidetached binary system where the secondary is close to filling its Roche lobe, or it may even be overflowing. The two stars revolve each other along a circular orbit with the components separated by 12.9 times the Sun's radius. Due to occultation of each component by the other, the apparent magnitude of the system decreased by 0.3 and 0.4 magnitudes over the course of the binary's orbit, which takes 34 hours 42.6 minutes to complete.

The primary component is a B-type main sequence star with a stellar classification of B1.5 V. It has 8.3 times the mass of the Sun and 3.9 times the Sun's radius. The secondary is a smaller B-type main sequence star with a classification of about B6.5 V, having 3.6 times the Sun's mass and 4.6 times the radius of the Sun. The effective temperature of the outer atmosphere for each star is 24,000 K for the primary and 17,000 K for the secondary. At these temperatures, the two stars glow with a blue-white hue.

== Nomenclature ==
μ^{1} Scorpii (Latinised to Mu^{1} Scorpii) is the system's Bayer designation. The designations of the primary as Mu^{1} Scorpii Aa derives from the convention used by the Washington Multiplicity Catalog (WMC) for multiple star systems, and adopted by the International Astronomical Union (IAU).

The pair of stars Mu^{1} and Mu^{2} Scorpii are known as the xami di mura 'eyes of the lion' by the Khoikhoi people of South Africa.

In 2016, the IAU organized a Working Group on Star Names (WGSN) to catalog and standardize proper names for stars. The WGSN decided to attribute proper names to individual stars rather than entire multiple systems. It approved the name Xamidimura for the component Mu^{1} Scorpii Aa on 5 September 2017 (along with Pipirima for the partner of Mu^{1} Scorpii) and it is now so included in the List of IAU-approved Star Names.

In Chinese, 尾宿 (Wěi Xiù), meaning Tail, refers to an asterism consisting of Mu^{1} Scorpii, Epsilon Scorpii, Zeta^{1} Scorpii and Zeta^{2} Scorpii, Eta Scorpii, Theta Scorpii, Iota^{1} Scorpii and Iota^{2} Scorpii, Kappa Scorpii, Lambda Scorpii and Upsilon Scorpii. Consequently, the Chinese name for Mu^{1} Scorpii itself is 尾宿一 (Wěi Xiù yī), "the First Star of Tail".
