= Kappa Scorpii =

Star in the constellation Scorpius

κ Scorpii
- Location of κ Sco (circled)

Observation data Epoch J2000 Equinox ICRS
- Constellation: Scorpius
- Right ascension: 17^{h} 42^{m} 29.27520^{s}
- Declination: −39° 01′ 47.9391″
- Apparent magnitude (V): 2.41 - 2.42

Characteristics
- Spectral type: B1.5 III
- U−B color index: −0.914
- B−V color index: −0.228
- Variable type: β Cephei

Astrometry
Radial velocity (R_{v})	−14.0 km/s
Proper motion (μ)	RA: −6.05 mas/yr Dec.: −25.54 mas/yr
Parallax (π)	6.75±0.17 mas
Distance	480 ± 10 ly (148 ± 4 pc)
Absolute magnitude (M_{V})	−3.48±0.06

Orbit (Note: from "Fixed Period Only" model)
Period (P)	195.458±0.007 days
Semi-major axis (a)	10.91±0.12 mas
Eccentricity (e)	0.520±0.006
Inclination (i)	102.3±0.2°
Longitude of the node (Ω)	281.96±0.12°
Periastron epoch (T)	2449983.23±0.4
Argument of periastron (ω) (secondary)	87.6±0.6°
Semi-amplitude (K_{1}) (primary)	48.0±0.3 km/s

Details

κ Sco A
Mass	10.2±0.3 M_{☉}
Radius	6.45±0.55 R_{☉}
Surface gravity (log g)	3.83±0.06 cgs
Temperature	23,170 K
Rotation	2.97±0.25 days
Rotational velocity (v sin i)	105 km/s
Age	15.1+1.8 −1.6 Myr

κ Sco B
Mass	9.3±0.3 M_{☉}
Radius	5.8 R_{☉}
Surface gravity (log g)	3.92 cgs
Temperature	22,750 K
Age	15.1+1.8 −1.6 Myr

Other designations
- Girtab, κ Sco, CD−38°12137, CPD−38°6992, FK5 660, HD 160578, HIP 86670, HR 6580, SAO 209163

Database references
SIMBAD	data

Kappa Scorpii, Latinized from κ Scorpii, is a binary star system in the southern constellation of Scorpius. With an apparent visual magnitude of 2.4, this star system is readily visible to the naked eye. Parallax measurements place it at an estimated distance of roughly 480 light-years (150 parsecs) from the Earth.

== Nomenclature ==
κ Scorpii has been called Girtab /ˈɡɜːrtæb/, which is the Sumerian word for 'scorpion'. The name has survived through the Babylonian star catalogues, and was originally applied to an asterism comprising this star, λ Scorpii, υ Scorpii, and ι Scorpii. Other sources have used the name Girtab for θ Scorpii (Sargas) or ι^{1} Scorpii. The latter appeared in a 1971 NASA catalog of star names that listed κ Scorpii as Mula, after an Indian asterism (nakshatra) in the same region.

In Chinese, 尾宿 (Wěi Xiù), meaning Tail, refers to an asterism consisting κ Scorpii, μ^{1} Scorpii, ε Scorpii, ζ^{1} Scorpii and ζ^{2} Scorpii, η Scorpii, θ Scorpii, ι^{1} Scorpii and ι^{2} Scorpii, λ Scorpii and υ Scorpii. Consequently, the Chinese name for κ Scorpii itself is 尾宿七 (Wěi Xiù qī), "the Seventh Star of Tail".

The Kamilaroi and Euahlayi Aboriginal peoples of New South Wales, Australia call this star Gidjirrigaa, the budgerigar.

== Properties ==
This is a spectroscopic binary, which is a type of binary star system in which the two stars are so close together that they have not been individually resolved with a telescope. The pair orbit each other with a period of about 195 days and an eccentricity of about 0.5. The combined spectrum of this pair matches a star with a stellar classification of B1.5 III. The 'III' luminosity class indicates the presence of a giant star that has exhausted the supply of hydrogen at its core and is in a late evolutionary stage.

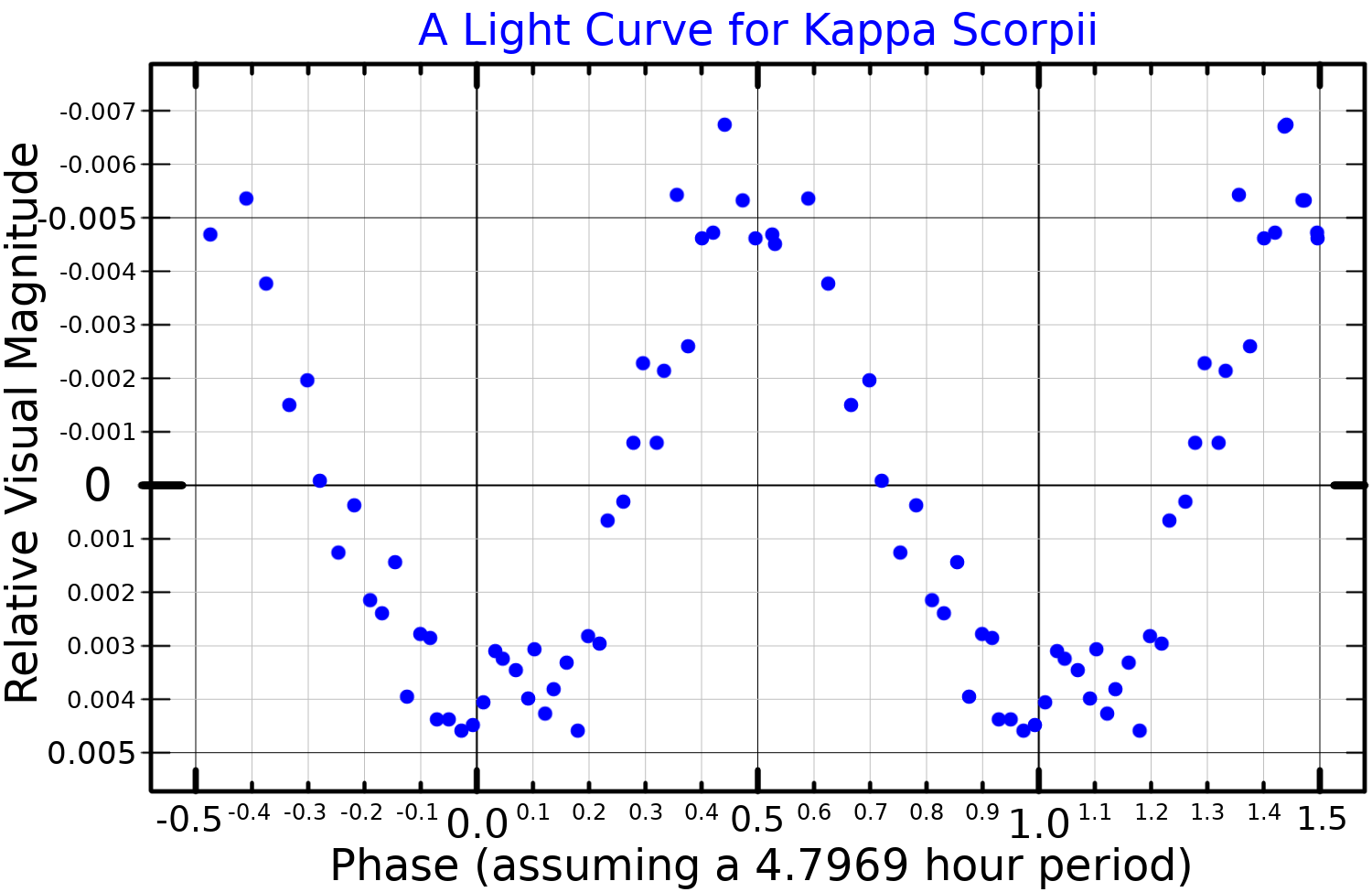
A light curve for Kappa Scorpii, adapted from Lomb and Shobbrook (1975)

The primary component of the pair, κ Sco A, is a variable star of Beta Cephei type. It is undergoing radial pulsations with a dominant frequency of five cycles per day, or 4.8 hours per cycle. There are overlapping secondary pulsation frequencies of about 4.85 and 5.69 cycles per day. This star has about 11 times the mass of the Sun and is nearly 7 times the Sun's radius. The effective temperature of the outer envelope is 23,400 K, giving it a blue-white hue. It is rotating rapidly, with an estimated period of only 1.9 days and an axis of rotation that is inclined by about 40° to the line of sight from the Earth.

The secondary component, κ Sco B, is smaller than the primary, but still much larger than the Sun. It has about 10 times the mass of the Sun and nearly six times the Sun's radius. The effective temperature of 18,800 K is also higher than the Sun's, which is at 5,778 K.

== Cultural significance ==
κ Scorpii appears on the flag of Brazil, symbolising the state of Paraíba.
