= Lambda Scorpii =

Triple star system in the constellation Scorpius

λ Scorpii
- Location of λ Scorpii (circled)

Observation data Epoch J2000 Equinox ICRS
- Constellation: Scorpius
- Pronunciation: /ˈʃɔːlə/
- Right ascension: 17^{h} 33^{m} 36.520^{s}
- Declination: −37° 06′ 13.76″
- Apparent magnitude (V): 1.63

Characteristics
- Evolutionary stage: Main sequence (A and B) + pre-main sequence (a)
- Spectral type: B1.5IV + B2IV
- U−B color index: −0.880
- B−V color index: −0.240
- Variable type: Beta Cephei (Aa1) + Algol (Aa1/2)

Astrometry
Radial velocity (R_{v})	−3.00 km/s
Proper motion (μ)	RA: −8.90 mas/yr Dec.: −29.95 mas/yr
Parallax (π)	5.71±0.90 mas
Distance	approx. 570 ly (approx. 180 pc)
Absolute magnitude (M_{V})	−3.70

Orbit
Primary	Aa
Secondary	Ab
Period (P)	2.8825 yr
Semi-major axis (a)	49.3 mas
Eccentricity (e)	0.121
Inclination (i)	77.2°

Orbit
Primary	Aa1
Secondary	Aa2
Period (P)	5.9520 d
Eccentricity (e)	0.26
Semi-amplitude (K_{1}) (primary)	39.3 km/s

Details

λ Sco Aa1 (A)
Mass	10.4 M_{☉}
Radius	8.8±1.2 R_{☉}
Luminosity	36,300 L_{☉}
Surface gravity (log g)	3.8 cgs
Temperature	25,000±1,000 K
Rotation	3.4±0.5 days
Rotational velocity (v sin i)	150 km/s

λ Sco Aa2 (a)
Mass	2.0±0.2 M_{☉}
Radius	1.5±0.2 R_{☉}

λ Sco Ab (B)
Mass	8.1 M_{☉}
Radius	4.7±1.0 R_{☉}
Surface gravity (log g)	4.0 cgs
Temperature	25,000±1,000 K

Other designations
- Shaula, 35 Scorpii, 35 Sco, CD−37 11673, FK5 652, HD 158926, HIP 85927, HR 6527, SAO 208954, CCDM J17336-3706A

Database references
SIMBAD	data

Lambda Scorpii is a triple star system and the second-brightest object in the constellation of Scorpius. It is formally named Shaula; Lambda Scorpii is its Bayer designation, which is Latinised from λ Scorpii and abbreviated Lambda Sco or λ Sco. With an apparent visual magnitude of 1.63, it is one of the brightest stars in the night sky.

== Nomenclature ==
λ Scorpii (Latinised to Lambda Scorpii) is the star system's Bayer designation.

It bore the traditional name Shaula, which comes from the Arabic الشولاء al-šawlā´ meaning 'the raised [tail]', as it is found in the tail of Scorpius, the scorpion. In 2016, the International Astronomical Union organized a Working Group on Star Names (WGSN) to catalog and standardize proper names for stars. The WGSN's first bulletin of July 2016 included a table of the first two batches of names approved by the WGSN, which included Shaula for the star λ Scorpii Aa1.

In Indian astronomy, it is part of the asterism Mula with other stars in the tail of Scorpius. Mūla ("root") (Devanagari मूल/मूळ) (Tamil: மூலம்) is the 19th nakshatra or "lunar mansion" in Vedic astrology. The symbol of Mula is a bunch of roots tied together (reticulated roots) or an 'elephant goad' (ankusha).

In Chinese, 尾宿 (Wěi Xiù), meaning Tail, refers to an asterism consisting of λ Scorpii, ε Scorpii, ζ^{1} Scorpii, ζ^{2} Scorpii, η Scorpii, θ Scorpii, ι^{1} Scorpii, ι^{2} Scorpii, κ Scorpii, μ^{1} Scorpii, and υ Scorpii. Consequently, the Chinese name for λ Scorpii itself is 尾宿八 (Wěi Xiù bā), "the Eighth Star of Tail".

Together with υ Scorpii (Lesath), Shaula is listed in the Babylonian compendium MUL.APIN as ^{d}Sharur_{4} u ^{d}Shargaz, meaning "Sharur and Shargaz". In Coptic, these two stars were called Minamref.

The indigenous Boorong people of northwestern Victoria (Australia) named it (together with Upsilon Scorpii) Karik Karik, "the Falcons".

== Properties ==
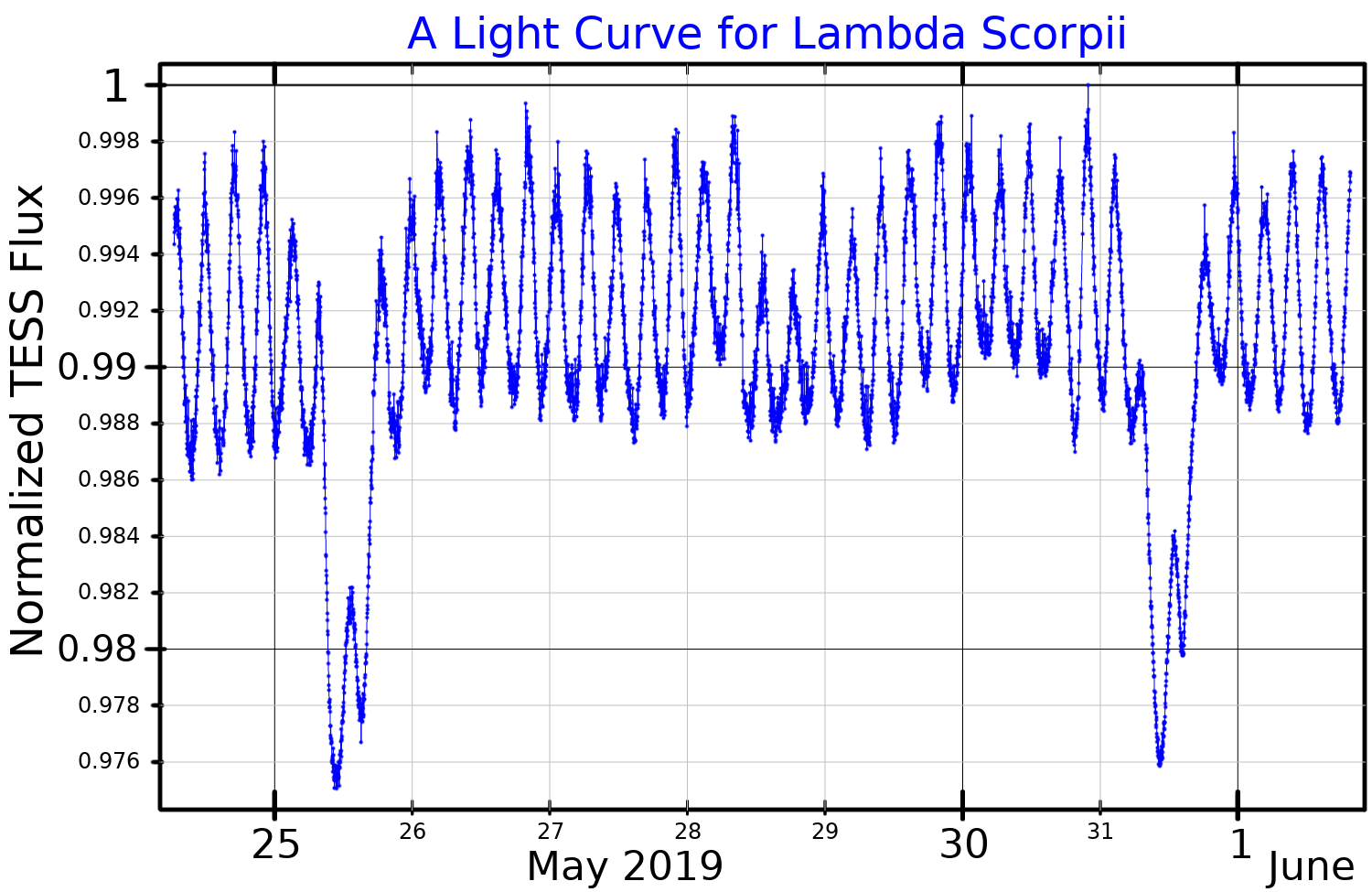
A light curve for Lambda Scorpii, plotted from TESS data. The large dips in brightness are eclipses, and the rapid oscillations show the Beta Cephei variability.

Lambda Scorpii is located approximately 570 light-years away from the Sun.

Spectroscopic and interferometric observations have shown that it is actually a triple star system consisting of two B-type stars and a pre-main-sequence star. The primary star is a Beta Cephei variable star with rapid brightness changes of about a hundredth of a magnitude. The pre-main-sequence star has an orbital period of 6 days and the B-type companion has a period of 1,053 days. The three stars lie in the same orbital plane, strongly suggesting that they were formed at the same time. The masses of the primary, pre-main-sequence star and the B-type companion are 14.5, 2.0 and 10.6 solar masses, respectively. The age of the system is estimated to be in the range 10–13 million years. Shaula Aa1 has sufficient mass to explode as a supernova.

A 15th-magnitude star has a separation of 42 arcseconds, whereas a 12th-magnitude star is 95 arcseconds away. It is not known whether or not these components are physically associated with Lambda Scorpii. If they both were, the first would have a projected linear separation of approximately 7,500 astronomical units (AU) and the second approximately 17,000 AU (0.27 light-years) away. Gaia Data Release 3 reports that the fainter of these two stars is a little larger and brighter than the sun and about 420 light years away, while the brighter star is a background object.

== In culture ==
Shaula appears on the flag of Brazil, symbolizing the state of Rio Grande do Norte.

USS Shaula (AK-118) was a U.S. Navy Crater-class cargo ship named after the star.

Shaula is the namesake of a character in Re:Zero, a Japanese web/light novel series by Tappei Nagatsuki.
