= HD 153072 =

Binary star in the constellation Scorpius

- Location of HD 153072 (circled in red)

Observation data Epoch J2000 Equinox ICRS
- Constellation: Scorpius
- Right ascension: 16^{h} 58^{m} 52.26726^{s}
- Declination: −37° 37′ 13.7743″
- Apparent magnitude (V): 6.05 (6.52 + 7.23)

Characteristics
- Spectral type: A2V + A5.5V
- B−V color index: 0.179

Astrometry
Radial velocity (R_{v})	−27.3±3.7 km/s
Proper motion (μ)	RA: +13.126 mas/yr Dec.: −46.036 mas/yr
Parallax (π)	9.99±0.13 mas
Distance	326 ± 4 ly (100 ± 1 pc)
Absolute magnitude (M_{V})	1.14

Orbit
Period (P)	38.66±0.55 yr
Semi-major axis (a)	0.179±0.001″
Eccentricity (e)	0.15±0.01
Inclination (i)	33.8±3.0°
Longitude of the node (Ω)	61±8°
Periastron epoch (T)	B 2024.55±0.50
Argument of periastron (ω) (secondary)	297±10°

Details

A
Mass	2.10±0.01 M_{☉}

B
Mass	1.75±0.01 M_{☉}

Other designations
- Shengong, CD−37 11131, CPD−37 6820, GC 22867, HD 153072, HIP 83100, HR 6298, SAO 208259, PPM 295736, WDS J16589-3737AB

Database references
SIMBAD	data

HD 153072, also named Shengong, is a binary star system in the constellation Scorpius, about 326 light-years (100 parsecs) distant. With an apparent magnitude of 6.05, it is very faintly visible to the naked eye under ideal viewing conditions. Both components are A-type stars; sources differ as to the luminosity class, some listing it as a main-sequence star and others as a giant star. The two stars orbit with a period of 38.7 years and a low eccentricity.

In Chinese astronomy, Shéngōng (simplified Chinese: 神宫; traditional Chinese: 神宮, "Divine Palace") is a single-star asterism associated with the lunar mansion Wěi (Tail). It has variously been identified as the star μ^{2} Scorpii (Pipirima); the star cluster NGC 6231; or another faint star or patch of stars near μ^{2}, embedded in clouds of the Milky Way. In the latter case, the position in old star catalogues most closely corresponds to this star, HIP 83100. The IAU Working Group on Star Names approved the name Shengong for the primary component HD 153072 A on 16 October 2025 and it is now so entered in the IAU Catalog of Star Names.
