= NGC 6441 =

Globular cluster in Scorpius

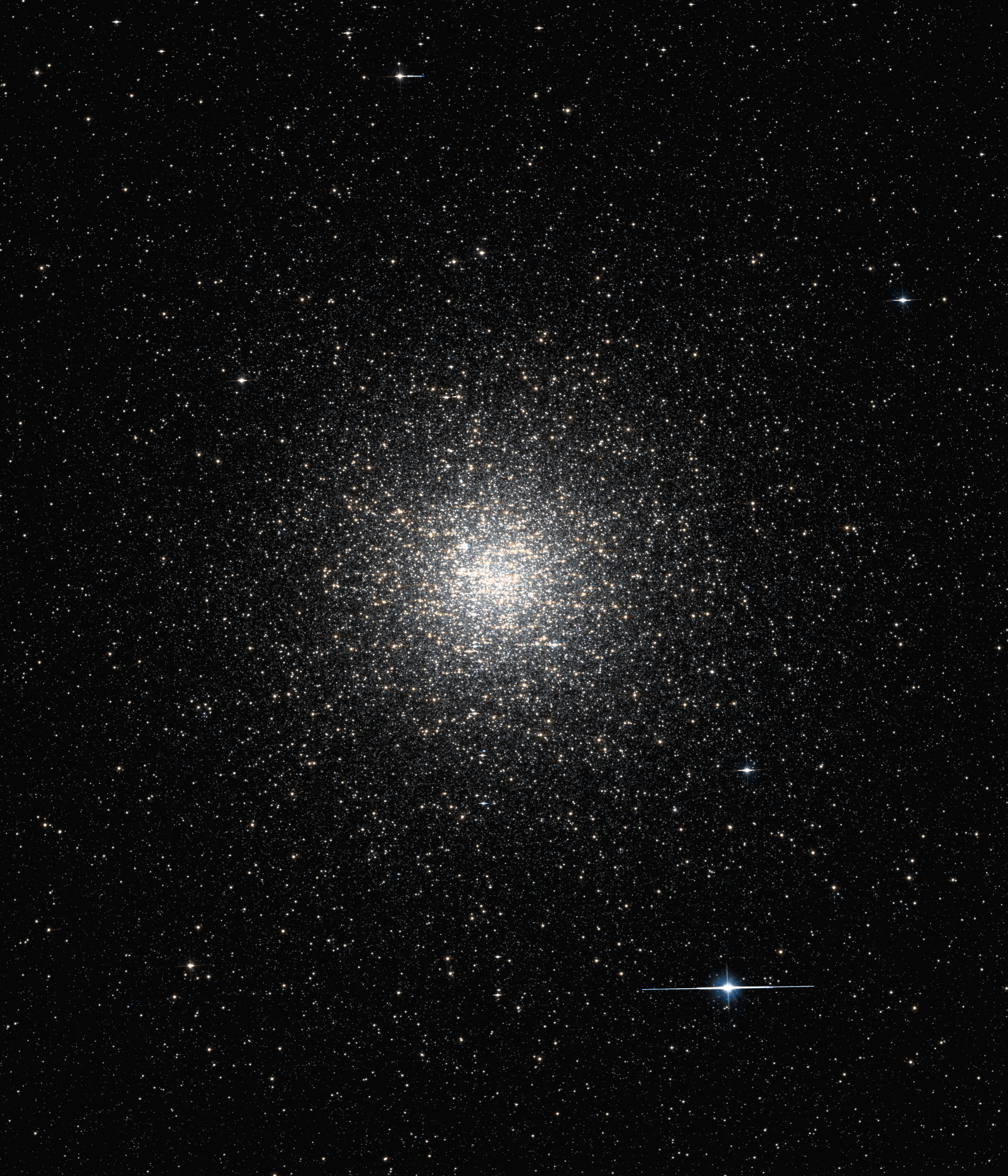

Observation data (J2000 epoch)
- Class: III
- Constellation: Scorpius
- Right ascension: 17^{h} 50^{m} 13.06^{s}
- Declination: −37° 03′ 05.2″
- Distance: 42.7 ± 2.3 kly (13.1 ± 0.7 kpc)
- Apparent magnitude (V): 7.2
- Apparent dimensions (V): 9.6′

Physical characteristics
- Mass: 1.6×10^{6} M_{☉}
- Radius: 4.8
- Tidal radius: 88.8 ly (27.23 pc)
- Metallicity: [Fe/H] = −0.53 dex
- Estimated age: 13−13.7 Gyr
- Other designations: GCl 78, CD−37° 11916, CPD−37° 7530, HD 161968

NGC 6441, sometimes also known as the Silver Nugget Cluster, is a globular cluster in the southern constellation of Scorpius. It was discovered by the Scottish astronomer James Dunlop on May 13, 1826, who described it as "a small, well-defined rather bright nebula, about 20″ in diameter". The cluster is located 5 arc minutes east-northeast of the star G Scorpii, and is some 43,000 light-years from the Sun.

This is one of the most massive and luminous globular clusters in the Milky Way, with an estimated 1.6 million solar masses of stars. It is located in the bulge of the galaxy at a distance of 13 kilolight-years (3.9 kpc) from the core, and is considered metal "rich". That is, it has a relatively high abundance of elements with higher mass than helium. The core region of the cluster subtends an angle of 0.11 arc minutes, compared to the half-mass radius of 0.64 arc minutes. The density of stars in the core region is indicated by the luminosity density: 5.25 L_{☉} pc^{−3}. The cluster has a half-light radius of 7.1 ly (2.18 pc).

This cluster has an abnormally large number of RR Lyrae variables—68 candidates as of 2006, and their periods are longer than is typical for their respective metallicities. (The mean period for the cluster's RRab stars is 0.759 day.) There are also several type II Cepheid stars, which is unusual given the high metallicity of this cluster. Examination of the red giant branch section of the color-magnitude diagram suggests that there are at least two and possibly three distinct populations in the cluster. The brightest and higher temperature members of the red clump stars are more concentrated toward the center of the cluster. This group may be a helium-enriched second generation of stars.

The cluster contains at least four millisecond pulsars, of which two are in binary systems. One of these binaries, PSR J1750−37A, is in a highly eccentric orbit with an eccentricity of 0.71. The cluster has an X-ray burster, X1746-370, which has the longest period known in any globular cluster and is consistent with the galaxy as a whole. Finally, there is a planetary nebula, JaFu 2, one of only four planetary nebulas known to inhabit globular clusters in the Milky Way.

== Possible central black hole ==
According to a study from 2021, the cluster's core may contain an intermediate-mass black hole with a mass of up to 13,200 M⊙.
