= Epsilon Scorpii =

Binary star in the constellation Scorpius

ε Scorpii
- Location of ε Sco (circled)

Observation data Epoch J2000 Equinox ICRS
- Constellation: Scorpius
- ε Sco A
- Right ascension: 16^{h} 50^{m} 09.8^{s}
- Declination: −34° 17′ 36″
- Apparent magnitude (V): 2.24 - 2.35
- ε Sco B
- Right ascension: 16^{h} 50^{m} 10.7^{s}
- Declination: −34° 17′ 44″

Characteristics

ε Sco A
- Evolutionary stage: Horizontal branch
- Spectral type: K1 III
- U−B color index: +1.147
- B−V color index: +1.150
- Variable type: suspected

Astrometry

ε Sco A
Radial velocity (R_{v})	−2.5 km/s
Proper motion (μ)	RA: −614.85 mas/yr Dec.: −255.98 mas/yr
Parallax (π)	51.19±0.22 mas
Distance	63.7 ± 0.3 ly (19.54 ± 0.08 pc)
Absolute magnitude (M_{V})	0.78±0.04

ε Sco B
Proper motion (μ)	RA: −611.794 mas/yr Dec.: −261.515 mas/yr
Parallax (π)	50.4231±0.0326 mas
Distance	64.68 ± 0.04 ly (19.83 ± 0.01 pc)

Details

ε Sco A
Mass	1.41±0.09 M_{☉}
Radius	12.91±0.25 R_{☉}
Luminosity	60 L_{☉}
Surface gravity (log g)	2.34 cgs
Temperature	4,522±28 K
Metallicity [Fe/H]	−0.17 dex
Rotational velocity (v sin i)	2.6±0.5 km/s
Age	3.92+0.55 −0.54 Gyr

ε Sco B
Mass	0.262±0.021 M_{☉}
Radius	0.288±0.019 R_{☉}
Luminosity	(9.30±0.25)×10^{−3} L_{☉}
Temperature	3,359±112 K

Other designations
- Wei, Larawag, 26 Scorpii, CD−34 11285, FK5 628, GCTP 3823.00, Gl 639.1, GJ 9579, HD 151680, HIP 82396, HR 6241, LHS 3244, SAO 208078

Database references
SIMBAD	A
- B

Epsilon Scorpii is a binary star in the southern zodiac constellation of Scorpius. The primary component has the proper name Larawag /ˈlærəwæɡ/. It has an apparent visual magnitude of around +2.3, making it the fifth-brightest member of the constellation. Parallax measurements made during the Hipparcos mission provide a measured distance of 63.7 light-years (19.5 parsecs).

== Characteristics ==
Larawag has a stellar classification of K1 III, which indicates it has exhausted the supply of hydrogen at its core and evolved into a giant star. Its mass is estimated at 1.41 times the mass of the Sun, and its radius is roughly 13 times that of the Sun. Presently it is generating energy through the nuclear fusion of helium at its core, which, considering the star's composition, places it along an evolutionary branch termed the horizontal branch. In the color-magnitude diagram, the star is located in the red clump. The star's outer atmosphere has an effective temperature of 4,522 K, giving it the orange hue of a cool K-type star.

It is classified as a suspected variable star with a magnitude range of 2.23 to 2.35, although a study of Hipparcos photometry showed a variation of no more than 0.01–0.02 magnitudes. It is an X-ray source with a luminosity of (1.5–1.6)×10^{27} erg/s.

In 2018 it was found that Epsilon Scorpii A has a proper motion companion separated by 14.4", making it a binary star sytstem. The companion, B, is much smaller and fainter than the primary, with 0.26% of the mass, 0.29% the radius, and less than 1% of the Sun's luminosity.

== Nomenclature ==
ε Scorpii, Latinised to Epsilon Scorpii, is the star's Bayer designation.

The star bore the traditional name Larawag in the culture of the Wardaman people of the Northern Territory of Australia, meaning clear sighting. In 2016, the IAU organized a Working Group on Star Names (WGSN) to catalog and standardize proper names for stars. The WGSN approved the name Larawag for Epsilon Scorpii A on 19 November 2017 and it is now so included in the List of IAU-approved Star Names.

Patrick Moore introduced the name Wei as Chinese name for this star. However, this seems to be a misreading, as Chinese 尾宿 (Wěi Xiù, English Tail) refers to an asterism (i.e. Chinese constellation) consisting of Epsilon Scorpii, Mu^{1} Scorpii, Zeta Scorpii, Eta Scorpii, Theta Scorpii, Iota Scorpii, Kappa Scorpii, Lambda Scorpii and Upsilon Scorpii. Consequently, the name for Epsilon Scorpii itself is 尾宿二 (Wěi Xiù èr), which means "the Second Star of Tail".

== In culture ==
Epsilon Scorpii appears on the flag of Brazil, symbolising the state of Ceará.
