= USS Lesuth =

Cargo ship of the United States Navy

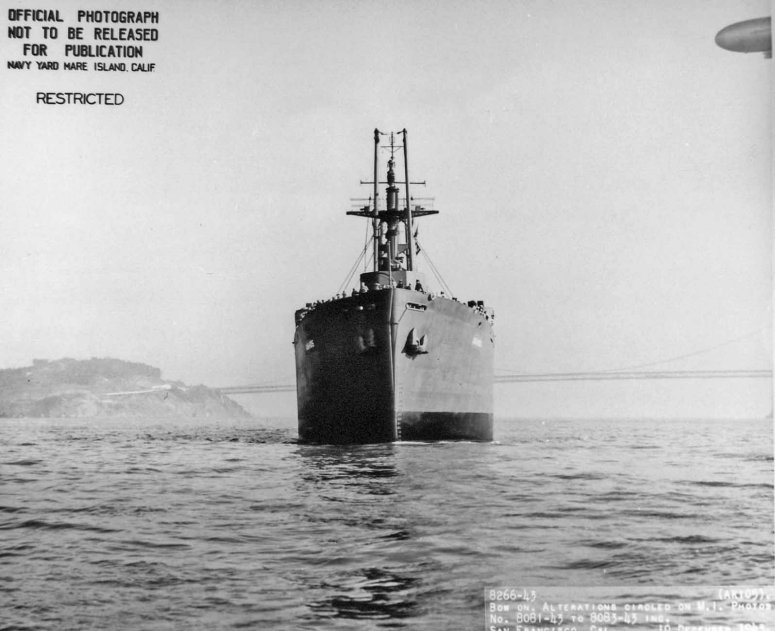
- Bow on view of USS Lesuth (AK-125) off San Francisco, 11 November 1943.

History

United States
- Name: William M. Gwin
- Namesake: William M. Gwin
- Owner: War Shipping Administration (WSA)
- Operator: American President Lines (APL)
- Ordered: as a Type EC2-S-C1 hull, MCE hull 1638
- Builder: California Shipbuilding Corporation, Terminal Island, Los Angeles, California
- Yard number: 171
- Way number: 4
- Laid down: 24 March 1943
- Launched: 17 April 1943
- Sponsored by: Miss M. B. Follis
- In service: 29 April 1943
- Fate: transferred to the US Navy, 9 October 1943

United States
- Name: Lesuth
- Namesake: The star Lesuth
- Acquired: 9 October 1943
- Commissioned: 1 November 1943
- Decommissioned: 16 August 1946
- Renamed: Lesuth, 11 October 1943
- Refit: converted for Naval service at United Engineering, Alameda, California
- Stricken: 17 July 1947
- Identification: Hull symbol: AK-125; Code letters: NHCF
- Honors and awards: 1 × battle star
- Fate: Sold for scrapping, 31 July 1964, withdrawn, 20 August 1964

General characteristics
- Class & type: Crater-class cargo ship
- Type: Type EC2-S-C1
- Displacement: 4,023 long tons (4,088 t) (standard); 14,550 long tons (14,780 t) (full load)
- Length: 441 ft 6 in (134.57 m)
- Beam: 56 ft 11 in (17.35 m)
- Draft: 28 ft 4 in (8.64 m)
- Installed power: 2 × Combustion Engineering header-type boilers, 220psi 450°; 2,500 shp (1,900 kW)
- Propulsion: 1 × Joshua Hendy vertical triple-expansion reciprocating steam engine; 1 × shaft
- Speed: 12.5 kn (23.2 km/h; 14.4 mph)
- Capacity: 7,800 t (7,700 long tons) DWT; 444,206 cu ft (12,578.5 m^{3}) (non-refrigerated)
- Complement: 15 officers 222 enlisted
- Armament: 1 × 5 in (127 mm)/38 caliber dual-purpose (DP) gun; 1 × 3 in (76 mm)/50 caliber DP gun; 2 × 40 mm (1.57 in) Bofors anti-aircraft (AA) gun mounts; 6 × 20 mm (0.79 in) Oerlikon cannon AA gun mounts

USS Lesuth (AK-125) was a Crater-class cargo ship commissioned by the US Navy for service in World War II. Lesuth was named after the star Lesuth in the constellation Scorpius. She was responsible for delivering troops, goods and equipment to locations in the Asiatic-Pacific Theater.

== Construction ==
Lesuth was laid down 24 March 1943, under a Maritime Commission (MARCOM) contract, MC hull No. 1638, as the Liberty ship SS William M. Gwin, by California Shipbuilding Corporation, Terminal Island, Los Angeles, California; launched 17 April 1943; sponsored by Miss M. B. Follis; acquired by the Navy 9 October 1943; renamed Lesuth 11 October 1943; converted at United Engineering, Alameda, California; and commissioned 1 November 1943.

== Service history ==
After loading cargo, Lesuth departed San Pedro, California, 14 November, arriving Pago Pago, Samoa, on 30 November. Four days later she arrived Funafuti, Ellice Islands and for the next 3 months engaged in training exercises in the South Pacific.

=== Serving South Pacific island bases ===
From Funafuti she steamed to the Marshall Islands, arriving Kwajalein 6 March 1944, as a unit of Service Squadron 8. Lesuth remained in the Marshall Islands until she departed Kwajalein 6 August, for Guadalcanal. She loaded cargo in the Solomons and Russell Islands, then sailed from Manus 14 September, en route to the Palau-Western Caroline campaign.

=== Supporting the Philippine invasion ===
The Palau Islands were of strategic importance as an advance base for the invasion of Leyte. The initial landings took place 15 September, 5 days before Lesuth arrived off Kossol Passage. For the next 2 months she remained off Peleliu unloading cargo needed for the Philippine assault. Sailing to Tulagi and Guadalcanal in late November, the cargo ship departed on 26 November for San Francisco, California.

After overhaul, Lesuth rejoined Service Squadron 8 at Eniwetok 11 February 1945. Later that month she sailed for the Philippines, arriving San Pedro Bay, Leyte, on 28 February. Following 6 weeks of cargo operations off Leyte, she steamed to the United States during May and June, for additional supplies, then returned to Ulithi 25 July.

=== End-of-war activity ===
When the Japanese surrender ended World War II, Lesuth was used to carry provisions to the occupation troops in the Far East. From September 1945 to May 1946, she made cargo runs to Japan, the Philippines, Okinawa, and Saipan, finally departing Saipan 5 May. Arriving San Francisco, California, on 24 May, Lesuth remained there until 2 July, when she sailed for Pearl Harbor.

== Post-war decommissioning ==
She decommissioned at Pearl Harbor 16 August 1946. Lesuth was returned to MARCOM 29 May 1947, and was struck from the Navy list 17 July.

== Fate ==
She was placed in the National Defense Reserve Fleet, Suisun Bay Group, until purchased by Union Minerals and Alloys Corporation, on 31 July 1964, for $49,660. She was physically removed from the Reserve Fleet on 8 August 1964.

== Awards ==
Lesuth received one battle star for World War II service. Her crew was eligible for the following medals:

- American Campaign Medal
- Asiatic-Pacific Campaign Medal (1)
- World War II Victory Medal
- Navy Occupation Service Medal (with Asia clasp)
- Philippines Liberation Medal

== Notes ==
Citations

== Bibliography ==
Online resources

- "Lesuth". Dictionary of American Naval Fighting Ships. Naval History and Heritage Command. This article incorporates text from this source, which is in the public domain.
- "California Shipbuilding, Los Angeles CA". www.ShipbuildingHistory.com. 13 October 2010.
- "USS Lesuth (AK-125)". NavSource. 11 July 2014.
- "LESUTH (AK-125)". United States Department of Transportation. Archived from the original on December 12, 2019.
