= Theta Scorpii =

Star in the constellation Scorpius

- Location of θ Scorpii (circled)

Observation data Epoch J2000 Equinox ICRS
- Constellation: Scorpius
- Right ascension: 17^{h} 37^{m} 19.12985^{s}
- Declination: −42° 59′ 52.1808″
- Apparent magnitude (V): 1.84 (1.862 + 6.22)

Characteristics
- Evolutionary stage: Post-stellar merger
- Spectral type: F1III
- U−B color index: +0.21
- B−V color index: +0.40

Astrometry
Radial velocity (R_{v})	+1.4 km/s
Proper motion (μ)	RA: +5.54 mas/yr Dec.: −3.12 mas/yr
Parallax (π)	9.90±0.26 mas
Distance	329 ± 9 ly (101 ± 3 pc)
Absolute magnitude (M_{V})	−2.71

Details
Mass	3.10+0.37 −0.32 M_{☉}
Radius	35.5 (equatorial); 26.3 (polar) R_{☉}
Luminosity	1,400 L_{☉}
Surface gravity (log g)	2.4±0.2 cgs
Temperature	6,294 K
Rotation	16.60 days
Rotational velocity (v sin i)	125 km/s

Other designations
- Sargas, Girtab, 160 G. Scorpii, θ Sco, CD−42°12312, FK5 654, HD 159532, HIP 86228, HR 6553, SAO 228201, CCDM J17373−4300

Database references
SIMBAD	data

Theta Scorpii (θ Scorpii, abbreviated Theta Sco, θ Sco) is a binary star in the southern zodiac constellation of Scorpius. The apparent visual magnitude of this star is +1.87, making it readily visible to the naked eye and one of the brightest stars in the night sky. It is sufficiently near that the distance can be measured directly using the parallax technique and such measurements obtained during the Hipparcos mission yield an estimate of approximately 329 light-years (101 parsecs) from the Sun.

The two components are designated θ Scorpii A (officially named Sargas /ˈsɑːrɡæs/, the traditional name for the system) and B.

== Nomenclature ==
θ Scorpii (Latinised to Theta Scorpii) is the system's Bayer designation. The designations of the two components as Theta Scorpii A and B derive from the convention used by the Washington Multiplicity Catalog (WMC) for multiple star systems, and adopted by the International Astronomical Union (IAU).

It bore the traditional name Sargas, of Sumerian origin. Another possible origin is Persian for Arrow Head سر گز. The name 'Sar Gaz' is used in Iran as a star name, and was used for timing irrigation water shares. In 2016, the IAU organized a Working Group on Star Names (WGSN) to catalogue and standardize proper names for stars. The WGSN decided to attribute proper names to individual stars rather than entire multiple systems. It approved the name Sargas for the star θ Scorpii A on 21 August 2016 and it is now so included in the List of IAU-approved Star Names.

In Chinese, 尾宿 (Wěi Xiù), meaning Tail, refers to an asterism consisting of Theta Scorpii, Epsilon Scorpii, Zeta^{1} Scorpii and Zeta^{2} Scorpii, Eta Scorpii, Iota^{1} Scorpii and Iota^{2} Scorpii, Kappa Scorpii, Lambda Scorpii, Mu^{1} Scorpii and Upsilon Scorpii. Consequently, the Chinese name for Theta Scorpii itself is 尾宿五 (Wěi Xiù wǔ), "the Fifth Star of Tail".

== Properties ==
The primary (θ Scorpii A) has a stellar classification of F1 III, with a luminosity class III indicating its luminosity is comparable to that of a F-type giant. With a mass 3.10 times that of the Sun, it is radiating 1,400 times as much luminosity as the Sun from its outer envelope at an effective temperature of 6,294 K, giving it the yellow-white-hued glow of an F-type star. This star is rotating rapidly, giving it an oblate shape with an equatorial radius 33% larger than the polar radius. The equatorial radius is about 36 R_{☉} while the polar radius is only about 26 R_{☉}. This rapid rotation suggests that it formed via the merger of a binary star system.

A magnitude 5.36 companion has been reported at an angular separation of 6.470 arcseconds, but subsequent observers have failed to detect it, so it probably does not exist. However, a secondary, designated θ Scorpii B, has been detected at an angular separation of 0.538 arcseconds in 1991 by the Hipparcos satellite.

== Modern legacy ==
Theta Scorpii appears on the flag of Brazil, symbolising the state of Alagoas.
