= Mu Scorpii =

The Bayer designation Mu Scorpii (μ Sco, μ Scorpii) is shared by two star systems, in the constellation Scorpius:

- μ^{1} Scorpii - a binary star whose primary is named Xamidimura
- μ^{2} Scorpii (named Pipirima)

They are separated by 0.1° in the sky.

They are separated too into different asterism in Chinese astronomy. μ^{1} Scorpii was a member of asterism 尾 (Wěi), Tail and μ^{2} Scorpii was the sole star in asterism 神宮 (Shéngōng), Changing Room (of the temple). Both asterisms are part of the Tail mansion.
