= Omega2 Scorpii =

Variable star

ω^{2} Scorpii
- Location of ω^{2} Scorpii (circled in red)

Observation data Epoch J2000.0 Equinox ICRS
- Constellation: Scorpius
- Right ascension: 16^{h} 07^{m} 24.32818^{s}
- Declination: −20° 52′ 07.5518″
- Apparent magnitude (V): +4.320

Characteristics
- Evolutionary stage: horizontal branch
- Spectral type: G6/8III
- U−B color index: +0.494
- B−V color index: +0.850

Astrometry
Radial velocity (R_{v})	−5.4 km/s
Proper motion (μ)	RA: +44.81 mas/yr Dec.: −45.42 mas/yr
Parallax (π)	11.22±0.32 mas
Distance	291 ± 8 ly (89 ± 3 pc)
Absolute magnitude (M_{V})	−0.62

Details
Mass	3.27 M_{☉}
Radius	15.0 R_{☉}
Luminosity	163 L_{☉}
Surface gravity (log g)	2.62±0.11 cgs
Temperature	5,363±42 K
Metallicity [Fe/H]	+0.03±0.05 dex
Age	282 Myr

Other designations
- Jabhat al Akrab, ω^{2} Sco, 10 Scorpii, BD−20°4408, HD 144608, HIP 78990, HR 5997, SAO 184135

Database references
SIMBAD	data

ω^{2} Scorpii, Latinised as Omega^{2} Scorpii, is a suspected variable star in the zodiac constellation of Scorpius. A component of the visual double star ω Scorpii, it is bright enough to be seen with the naked eye having an apparent visual magnitude of +4.320. The distance to this star, as determined using parallax measurements, is around 291 light years. The visual magnitude of this star is reduced by 0.38 because of extinction from interstellar dust.

It is 0.05 degree north of the ecliptic, so can be occulted by the moon and planets.

This is a G-type giant star with a stellar classification of G6/8III. With an estimated age of 282 million years, it is an evolved, thin disk star that is currently on the red horizontal branch. The interferometry-measured angular diameter of this star is 1.63 ± 0.10 mas, which, at its estimated distance, equates to a physical radius of nearly 16 times the radius of the Sun. It has 3.27 times the mass of the Sun, and radiates 141 times the Sun's luminosity The effective temperature of the star's outer atmosphere is 5,363 K.

== Names ==
In the Cook Islands, a traditional story is told of twins who flee their parents into the sky and become the pair of stars Omega^{2} and Omega^{1} Scorpii. The girl, who is called Piri-ere-ua "Inseparable", keeps tight hold of her brother, who is not named. (The IAU used a version of this story from Tahiti to name Mu^{2} Scorpii.)
