= Omega1 Scorpii =

Star in the constellation of Scorpius

ω^{1} Scorpii
- Location of ω^{1} Scorpii (circled in red)

Observation data Epoch J2000.0 Equinox ICRS
- Constellation: Scorpius
- Right ascension: 16^{h} 06^{m} 48.42692^{s}
- Declination: −20° 40′ 09.0902″
- Apparent magnitude (V): +3.95

Characteristics
- Spectral type: B1 V
- U−B color index: −0.82
- B−V color index: −0.05
- Variable type: Beta Cephei variable

Astrometry
Radial velocity (R_{v})	−3.1 km/s
Proper motion (μ)	RA: −8.98 mas/yr Dec.: −23.48 mas/yr
Parallax (π)	6.92±0.26 mas
Distance	470 ± 20 ly (145 ± 5 pc)
Absolute magnitude (M_{V})	−1.87

Details
Mass	11.4 M_{☉}
Radius	6.6 R_{☉}
Luminosity	9,120 L_{☉}
Temperature	26,530 K
Metallicity [Fe/H]	−0.45±0.15 dex
Rotation	14.4 h
Rotational velocity (v sin i)	105 km/s
Age	5 Myr

Other designations
- Jabhat al Akrab, ω^{1} Sco, 9 Scorpii, BD−20°4405, HD 144470, HIP 78933, HR 5993, SAO 184123

Database references
SIMBAD	data

ω^{1} Scorpii, Latinised as Omega^{1} Scorpii, is a star in the zodiac constellation of Scorpius. With an apparent visual magnitude of 3.95 it can be seen with the naked eye, 0.22 degree north of the ecliptic. Parallax measurements of this star give an estimated distance of around 470 light years from the Sun. It is a member of the Scorpius–Centaurus association.

This is a B-type main sequence star with a stellar classification of B1 V. It has a luminosity of 9,120 Suns, consistent with an isochronal age of 5 million years and an estimated mass of 11 solar masses. The radius is about 6.6 times that of the Sun. It has an effective temperature of 26,530 in its outer atmosphere.

Omega^{1} Scorpii is a β Cephei star that undergoes non-radial pulsations at a rate of 15 cycles per day. This is causing the surface temperature to fluctuate between 28,300 K and 22,600 K along the equator. The star is spinning rapidly with a projected rotational velocity of 105 km/s and an estimated rotation period of 14^{h}.4. The poles of the star are inclined by around 60° to the line-of-sight from the Earth.

== Names ==
In the Cook Islands, a traditional story is told of twins who flee their parents into the sky and become the pair of stars Omega^{1} and Omega^{2} Scorpii. The girl, who is called Piri-ere-ua "Inseparable", keeps tight hold of her brother, who is not named. (The IAU used a version of this story from Tahiti to name Mu^{2} Scorpii.)
