= Omega Scorpii =

There are two stars with the Bayer designation ω Scorpii (omega Scorpii):

- ω^{1} Scorpii
- ω^{2} Scorpii

They are separated by 0.24° on the sky, which is far enough apart to be individually resolved with the naked eye. The two stars are not physically associated with each other, and thus only form an optical pair. ω Scorpii also has the traditional name Jabhat al Akrab, which is derived from the Arabic جبهة العقرب jabhat[u] al-^{c}aqrab meaning "[The] forehead of the scorpion". For the Chinese, the pair were known as Kow Kin, meaning a Hook and Latch.
