= Xi Scorpii =

Star system

- Location of ξ Scorpii (circled in red)

Observation data Epoch J2000 Equinox ICRS
- Constellation: Scorpius
- ξ Sco ABC
- Right ascension: 16^{h} 04^{m} 22.191^{s}
- Declination: −11° 22′ 22.60″
- Apparent magnitude (V): 4.17 (5.16 / 4.87 / 7.30)
- Component D
- Right ascension: 16^{h} 04^{m} 25.9260^{s}
- Declination: −11° 26′ 57.778″
- Apparent magnitude (V): 7.43
- Component E
- Right ascension: 16^{h} 04^{m} 26.7188^{s}
- Declination: −11° 26′ 59.553″
- Apparent magnitude (V): 7.81

Characteristics

ξ Sco ABC
- Spectral type: F4(V) + F6(V) + G1V
- U−B color index: +0.00
- B−V color index: +0.45

Components DE
- Spectral type: K1(V) + K1(V)
- U−B color index: +0.315
- B−V color index: +0.75

Astrometry

ξ Sco ABC
| Radial velocity (R_{v}) | −36.33±0.83 km/s |
| Proper motion (μ) | RA: −63.2 mas/yr Dec.: −27.0 mas/yr |

Component D
| Radial velocity (R_{v}) | −31.96±0.13 km/s |
| Proper motion (μ) | RA: −61.607 mas/yr Dec.: −22.227 mas/yr |
| Parallax (π) | 35.8898±0.0200 mas |
| Distance | 90.88 ± 0.05 ly (27.86 ± 0.02 pc) |
| Absolute magnitude (M_{V}) | 4.47 |

Component E
| Radial velocity (R_{v}) | −32.28±0.12 km/s |
| Proper motion (μ) | RA: −56.334 mas/yr Dec.: −20.357 mas/yr |
| Parallax (π) | 35.8718±0.0237 mas |
| Distance | 90.92 ± 0.06 ly (27.88 ± 0.02 pc) |
| Absolute magnitude (M_{V}) | 5.18 |

Orbit
| Primary | ξ Sco A |
| Name | ξ Sco B |
| Period (P) | 45.90±0.60 yr |
| Semi-major axis (a) | 0.654±0.006″ |
| Eccentricity (e) | 0.744±0.001 |
| Inclination (i) | 34.5±1.0° |
| Longitude of the node (Ω) | 25.3±4.0° |
| Periastron epoch (T) | B 1997.22±0.02 |
| Argument of periastron (ω) (secondary) | 163.8±5.0° |

Orbit
| Primary | ξ Sco AB |
| Name | ξ Sco C |
| Period (P) | 1514.43 yr |
| Semi-major axis (a) | 7.755″ |
| Eccentricity (e) | 0.041 |
| Inclination (i) | 131.5° |
| Longitude of the node (Ω) | 47.4° |
| Periastron epoch (T) | B 2226.10 |
| Argument of periastron (ω) (secondary) | 59.3° |

Details

A
| Mass | 1.53 M_{☉} |
| Temperature | 6,532 K |

B
| Mass | 1.53 M_{☉} |
| Temperature | 6,532 K |

C
| Mass | 1.00 M_{☉} |
| Temperature | 5,705 K |

D
| Mass | 0.89 M_{☉} |
| Radius | 0.94 R_{☉} |
| Luminosity | 0.71 L_{☉} |
| Surface gravity (log g) | 4.49 cgs |
| Temperature | 5,529 K |
| Age | 2.3 Gyr |

E
| Mass | 0.88 M_{☉} |
| Radius | 0.77 R_{☉} |
| Luminosity | 0.44 L_{☉} |
| Surface gravity (log g) | 4.54 cgs |
| Temperature | 5,217 K |
| Age | 2.3 Gyr |

Other designations
- Components ABC: ξ Sco, BD−10°4237, GJ 9540, HIP 78727, SAO 159665 (only AB), ADS 9909
- ξ Sco A: HD 144070, HR 5978
- ξ Sco B: HD 144069, HR 5977
- ξ Sco C: SAO 159666

Other designations
- Components DE: GJ 9541, ADS 9910
- Component D: BD−11°4057, HD 144087, HIP 78738, SAO 159668
- Component E: BD−11°4058, HD 144088, HIP 78739, SAO 159670

Database references
| SIMBAD | ξ Sco ABC |
- ξ Sco AB
- ξ Sco A
- ξ Sco B
- ξ Sco C
- Component D
- Component E
| ARICNS | ξ Sco A |
- ξ Sco B
- ξ Sco C

Xi Scorpii (ξ Sco) is part of a quintuple star system in the constellation Scorpius. It was assigned this designation by Bayer, although Ptolemy had catalogued the star in Libra. Flamsteed assigned it the designation 51 Librae, but this has fallen out of use since modern constellation boundaries assign the star to Scorpius.

== Nomenclature ==
ξ Scorpii (Latinized to Xi Scorpii) is the star's Bayer designation. Xi Scorpii has no proper name, though it was erroneously known as Graffias before that name was applied to Beta Scorpii. Its Flamsteed designation is 51 Librae. When the modern constellation boundaries were drawn, Xi Scorpii was assigned to Scorpius, and the Flamsteed designation fell out of use.

The five stars of the Xi Scorpii system all have different designations, plus some designations that apply to more than one star. Xi Scorpii A, B, and C appear very close together in the sky and are typically grouped under a single multiple star designation, while components D and E are usually grouped under a separate multiple star designation. For example, Struve's catalogue of multiple stars includes the pair AB and C as Σ1998 and the pair D and E as Σ1999.

| Component | Bayer | HR | HD | SAO | HIP | GJ |
|---|---|---|---|---|---|---|
| A | ξ Scorpii | 5978 | 144070 | 159665 | 78727 | 9540 |
| B | ξ Scorpii | 5977 | 144069 | 159665 | 78727 | 9540 |
| C | ξ Scorpii | none | none | 159666 | 78727 | 9540 |
| D | none | none | 144087 | 159668 | 78738 | 9541 |
| E | none | none | 144088 | 159670 | 78739 | 9541 |

== Properties ==
The Xi Scorpii system consists of five stars in two groups separated by about 4.7 arcminutes (or 0.08°) on the sky.

The brighter group contains Xi Scorpii A, B, and C. A and B are both yellow-white F-type stars. A is slightly brighter and warmer. They are separated by 0.744 arcseconds on average, and orbit around a common center once every 45.9 years. The dimmer, seventh-magnitude Xi Scorpii C orbits this pair at about ten times the distance, having a separation of around 7.6 arcseconds.

The second group contains components D and E, both K-type main-sequence stars, separated by about 11.9 arcseconds. They are known to be associated to each other and with the rest of the stars, because all stars share similar proper motions.
