= Iota Scorpii =

The Bayer designation ι Scorpii (Iota Scorpii) is shared by two stars in the constellation Scorpius:

- ι^{1} Scorpii
- ι^{2} Scorpii

They are separated by 0.50° in the sky.

Both of them were members of the asterism 尾 (Wěi), Tail, Tail mansion.
