= Mu2 Scorpii =

B-type star in the constellation of Scorpius

μ^{2} Scorpii (Pipirima)
- Location of μ^{2} Scorpii (circled)

Observation data Epoch J2000 Equinox J2000
- Constellation: Scorpius
- Right ascension: 16^{h} 52^{m} 20.14532^{s}
- Declination: −38° 01′ 03.1258″
- Apparent magnitude (V): +3.56

Characteristics
- Evolutionary stage: main sequence
- Spectral type: B2 IV
- U−B color index: −0.878
- B−V color index: −0.219

Astrometry
Radial velocity (R_{v})	+1.4 km/s
Proper motion (μ)	RA: −11.09 mas/yr Dec.: −23.32 mas/yr
Parallax (π)	6.88±0.12 mas
Distance	474 ± 8 ly (145 ± 3 pc)
Absolute magnitude (M_{V})	−2.25

Details
Mass	9.1±0.3 M_{☉}
Radius	5.6±0.2 R_{☉}
Luminosity	2,385 L_{☉}
Surface gravity (log g)	3.8±0.2 cgs
Temperature	21,700±900 K
Rotational velocity (v sin i)	58 km/s
Age	20±4 Myr

Other designations
- Pipirima, μ^{2} Sco, CD−37°11037, HD 151985, HIP 82545, HR 6252, SAO 208116

Database references
SIMBAD	data
Exoplanet Archive	data

Mu^{2} Scorpii, also named Pipirima /pɪˈpɪrɪmə/, is a star in the zodiac constellation of Scorpius. It has an apparent visual magnitude of +3.56, which is bright enough to be seen with the naked eye. Its distance from the Sun is about 474 light-years, as determined by parallax measurements. It is a member of the Upper Centaurus–Lupus subgroup of the Scorpius–Centaurus association. A super-Jupiter or brown dwarf is known to orbit it, and another is suspected.

== Nomenclature ==
μ^{2} Scorpii (Latinised to Mu^{2} Scorpii, abbreviated μ^{2} Sco, Mu^{2} Sco) is the star's Bayer designation.

A traditional Polynesian story is told of a brother and sister who flee their parents into the sky and become stars. In one account, the children become Shaula and Lesath in the tip of the tail of Scorpius, and in another they become Mu^{2} and Mu^{1} Scorpii. In the Tahitian version of this story, the brother and sister are named Pipiri and Rehua, and their parents call them Pipiri ma while chasing them into the sky: ma "with, and" is used after names to mean "et al." (In a similar version of the story told in the Cook Islands, they become Omega^{1} and Omega^{2} Scorpii).

In 2016, the IAU organized a Working Group on Star Names (WGSN) to catalog and standardize proper names for stars. The WGSN approved the name Pipirima for this star on 5 September 2017 (along with Xamidimura for its partner) and it is now so included in the List of IAU-approved Star Names.

In Chinese astronomy, Mu^{2} Scorpii is identified as the second added star of the Tail asterism (Chinese: 尾宿增二; pinyin: Wěi Xiù zēng èr). (Note: Stellarium, citing Yi Shitong, 1981) It was historically called Shengong (Chinese: 神宮; pinyin: Shéngōng), a name which was later applied to the star cluster NGC 6231, and has been adopted by the IAU Working Group on Star Names for the star HD 153072.

== Properties ==
Mu^{2} Scorpii is a blue-white B-type subgiant star with a stellar classification of B2 IV. It has an estimated diameter of 5.6 solar radii and a mass of 9.1 times the Sun's mass, and shines with 2,385 times the Sun's luminosity. The large mass of this star makes it a supernova progenitor. The outer atmosphere has an effective temperature of 21,700 K. It is some 20 million years old and is spinning with a projected rotational velocity of 58 km/s.

== Planetary system ==
Two sub-stellar objects slightly above the deuterium burning limit were found in 2022 by direct imaging around Mu^{2} Scorpii. The outer one, designated μ^{2} Scorpii b, is definitely an orbiting planet or brown dwarf, and the inner one is a planetary candidate.

The Mu^{2} Scorpii planetary system
Companion (in order from star)	Mass	Semimajor axis (AU)	Orbital period (years)	Eccentricity	Inclination (°)	Radius
c (unconfirmed)	18.5±1.5 M_{J}	18.9^{+11.7}_{−5.0}	—	0.61^{+0.19}_{−0.32}	62.8^{+9.9}_{−16.6}°	1.827±0.077 or 1.893±0.080 (Note: Calculated, using the Stefan-Boltzmann law and the star's effective temperature and luminosity, with respect to the solar nominal effective temperature of 5,772 K: √((5,772/(2,262 ± 28))^{4} • 10^{-3.08 ± 0.03}) = 0.18778 ± 0.00798 R_{☉}. √((5,772/(2,274 ± 28))^{4} • 10^{-3.04 ± 0.03}) = 0.19457 ± 0.00825 R_{☉}. Converting R_{☉} to R_{J} requires multiplying the value to 9.7311.) R_{J}
b	14.4±0.8 M_{J}	242.4^{+114.5}_{−52.1}	—	0.56^{+0.27}_{−0.26}	96.6^{+21.5}_{−20.5}	—

== See also ==
- List of largest exoplanets - including Mu^{2} Scorpii b and c
