= Zeta Scorpii =

The Bayer designation Zeta Scorpii (ζ Sco, ζ Scorpii) is shared by two stars in the constellation Scorpius:

- ζ¹ Scorpii (HD 152236.)
- ζ² Scorpii (HD 152334.)

They are separated by 7 arc minutes on the sky. The stars are not physically related as they are at greatly different distances from the Earth.

Both stars are members of asterism 尾 (Wěi), Tail, Tail mansion.
