= G Scorpii =

Star in the constellation Scorpius

- Location of G Scorpii (circled)

Observation data Epoch J2000 Equinox ICRS
- Constellation: Scorpius
- Right ascension: 17^{h} 49^{m} 51.48081^{s}
- Declination: −37° 02′ 35.8975″
- Apparent magnitude (V): 3.21

Characteristics
- Evolutionary stage: horizontal branch
- Spectral type: K2 III
- U−B color index: +1.19
- B−V color index: +1.17

Astrometry
Radial velocity (R_{v})	+24.7 km/s
Proper motion (μ)	RA: +40.59 mas/yr Dec.: +27.24 mas/yr
Parallax (π)	25.92±0.15 mas
Distance	125.8 ± 0.7 ly (38.6 ± 0.2 pc)
Absolute magnitude (M_{V})	+0.24

Details
Mass	1.2±0.2 M_{☉}
Radius	16.4 R_{☉}
Luminosity	93±4 L_{☉}
Surface gravity (log g)	2.2 cgs
Temperature	4,535±125 K
Metallicity [Fe/H]	−0.20 dex
Rotational velocity (v sin i)	<1.0 km/s

Other designations
- Fuyue, G Sco, γ Tel, CD−37°11907, FK5 669, HD 161892, HIP 87261, HR 6630, SAO 209318

Database references
SIMBAD	data

G Scorpii (abbreviated G Sco), also named Fuyue, is a giant star in the constellation of Scorpius. It has an apparent magnitude of +3.19. It is approximately 126 light-years from the Sun.

== Nomenclature ==
G Scorpii is the star's Bayer designation. It was formerly situated in the constellation of Telescopium where it was designated γ Telescopii, Latinised to Gamma Telescopii. It was resited in Scorpius and redesignated G Scorpii by Benjamin Apthorp Gould.

G Scorpii bore the traditional name Fuyue (simplified Chinese: 傅说; traditional Chinese: 傅說) in ancient China. Fu Yue was a former slave that became a high-ranking minister to Shang dynasty ruler Wu Ding. In 2016, the IAU organized a Working Group on Star Names (WGSN) to catalog and standardize proper names for stars. The WGSN approved the name Fuyue for this star on 30 June 2017 and it is now so included in the IAU Catalog of Star Names.

== Properties ==
G Scorpii is an orange K-type giant. It is about 20% more massive than the Sun. The measured angular diameter is 3.94±0.21 mas. At the estimated distance of this system, this yields a physical size 16.4 times that of the Sun. With an effective surface temperature of 4,535 K, it has a bolometric luminosity of 93 L_{☉}.

Evolutionary models show that G Scorpii has probably left the red giant branch and is now fusing helium in its core. This makes it a red clump star, at the cool end of the horizontal branch.

Just 5 arcminutes to the east is the globular cluster NGC 6441. At magnitude 3.2, G Scorpii is around 40 times brighter than the entire globular cluster.
