= Messier 7 =

Open star cluster in the constellation of Scorpius

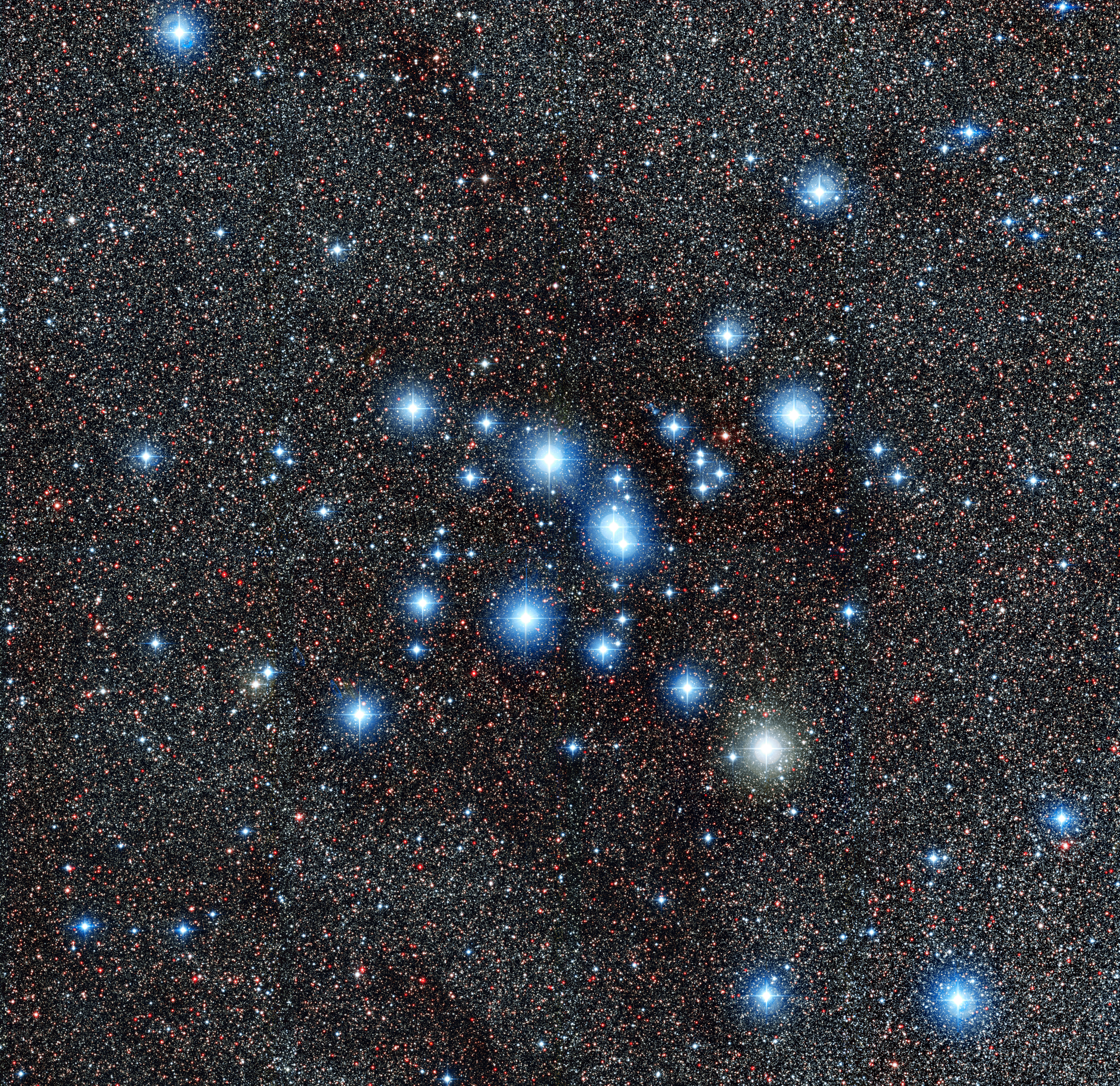

Observation data (J2000.0 epoch)
- Right ascension: 17^{h} 53^{m} 51.2^{s}
- Declination: −34° 47′ 34″
- Distance: 980 ± 33 ly (300 ± 10 pc)
- Apparent magnitude (V): 3.3
- Apparent dimensions (V): 80.0′

Physical characteristics
- Mass: 735 M_{☉}
- Radius: 25 ly
- Estimated age: 200 Myr
- Other designations: Ptolemy Cluster, M7, NGC 6475, Cr 354

Associations
- Constellation: Scorpius

Messier 7 or M7, also designated NGC 6475 and sometimes known as Ptolemy's Cluster, is an open cluster of stars in the constellation of Scorpius. The cluster is easily detectable with the naked eye, close to the "stinger" of Scorpius. With a declination of −34.8°, it is the southernmost Messier object.

== Observations ==
M7 has been known since antiquity; it was first recorded by the 2nd-century Greek-Roman astronomer Ptolemy, who described it as a nebula in 130 AD. Italian astronomer Giovanni Batista Hodierna observed it before 1654 and counted 30 stars in it. In 1764, French astronomer Charles Messier catalogued the cluster as the seventh member in his list of comet-like objects. English astronomer John Herschel described it as "coarsely scattered clusters of stars". In Chinese astronomy it is identified as Yú, the Fish (simplified Chinese: 鱼; traditional Chinese: 魚).

Telescopic observations of the cluster reveal about 80 stars within a field of view of 1.3° across. At the cluster's estimated distance of 980 light years this corresponds to an actual diameter of 25 light years. The tidal radius of the cluster is 40.1 ly (12.3 pc) and it has a combined mass of about 735 times the mass of the Sun. The age of the cluster is around 200 million years while the brightest member star is of magnitude 5.6. In terms of composition, the cluster contains a similar abundance of elements other than hydrogen and helium as the Sun.

On August 29, 2006, Messier 7 was used for the first light image of the Long Range Reconnaissance Imager (LORRI) telescope on the Pluto-bound New Horizons spacecraft.

As of January 2022, Messier 7 is one of the few remaining Messier objects not photographed by the Hubble Space Telescope. This is mainly due to those objects' angular diameter or lack of scientific significance. Most such objects are open clusters of large angular diameter that would require thousands of photos due to Hubble's small field of view. (For comparison, Hubble's well known panoramic photo of the Andromeda Galaxy, covering less than half of our galactic neighbor, required approximately 400 individual movements and 7400 exposures.)

== Brightest members ==
Messier 7 contains over a thousand likely members stars spread across several degrees. Members brighter than about 8th magnitude have evolved away from the main sequence, with the most luminous main sequence stars around spectral class A0. The brightest stars with a membership probability higher than 75%:

| Designation | Right ascension | Declination | Apparent magnitude | Spectral type |
|---|---|---|---|---|
| HD 162391 | 17^{h} 52^{m} 19.76^{s} | −34° 25′ 00.6″ | 5.53 | G8/K0III |
| HD 162496 | 17^{h} 52^{m} 49.22^{s} | −34° 06′ 06.5″ | 5.68 | K1III |
| V957 Sco | 17^{h} 52^{m} 13.66^{s} | −34° 47′ 57.1″ | 5.86 | B5IIIp |
| HD 162587 (Note: Not in Gaia DR2, so doesn't appear in Cantat-Gaudin & Anders, but generally considered to be a member.) | 17^{h} 53^{m} 23.47^{s} | −34° 53′ 42.4″ | 5.98 | K1III |
| HD 162515 | 17^{h} 52^{m} 55.77^{s} | −34° 01′ 08.0″ | 6.53 | B9III |
| HD 163274 | 17^{h} 56^{m} 50.03^{s} | −34° 41′ 20.0″ | 6.65 | B9III/IV |
| HD 163139 | 17^{h} 56^{m} 07.88^{s} | −34° 02′ 56.1″ | 6.73 | B9.51III |
| HD 162780 | 17^{h} 54^{m} 14.38^{s} | −34° 43′ 39.5″ | 6.86 | B9.5III+n |
| HD 162888 | 17^{h} 54^{m} 47.88^{s} | −34° 32′ 31.8″ | 6.92 | A0IIIn |
| HD 161575 | 17^{h} 47^{m} 47.55^{s} | −34° 18′ 38.5″ | 6.93 | B9III(pSi) |
| V958 Sco | 17^{h} 53^{m} 15.98^{s} | −34° 37′ 15.1″ | 6.94 | B8/9III |

== Gallery ==
M7 on the night sky. It is easily visible to the naked eye and located between the constellations Scorpius and Sagittarius.

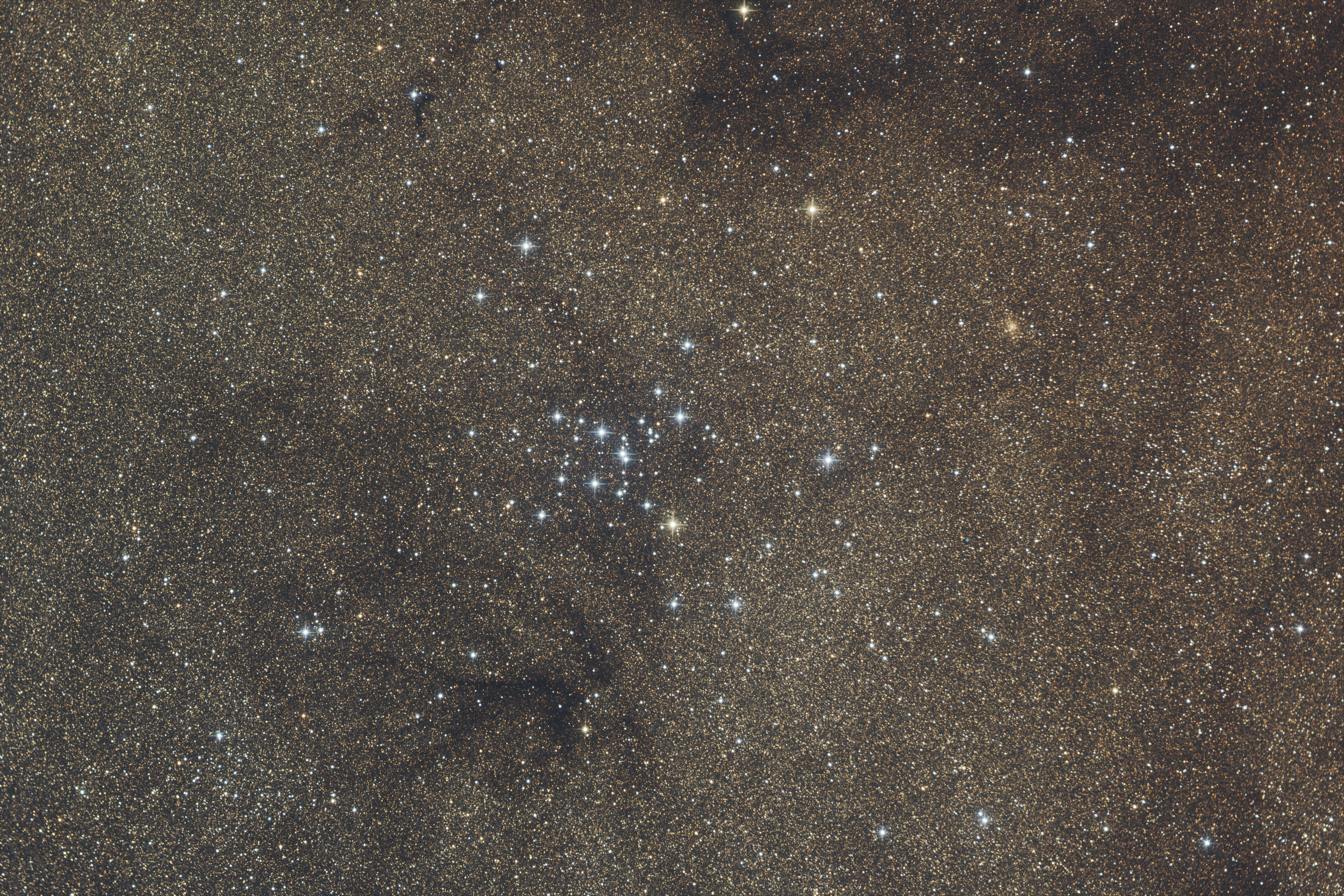
Broader view of M7, with the cluster at the center of the image

== See also ==
- List of Messier objects
- List of open clusters
- New General Catalogue
