= Iota2 Scorpii =

Star in the constellation Scorpius

ι^{2} Scorpii
- Location of ι^{2} Scorpii (circled in red)

Observation data Epoch J2000 Equinox ICRS
- Constellation: Scorpius
- Right ascension: 17^{h} 50^{m} 11.11291^{s}
- Declination: −40° 05′ 25.5629″
- Apparent magnitude (V): +4.82

Characteristics
- Spectral type: A2 Ib or A6 Ib
- U−B color index: +0.19
- B−V color index: +0.25

Astrometry
Radial velocity (R_{v})	−10.2 km/s
Proper motion (μ)	RA: +3.90 mas/yr Dec.: −2.42 mas/yr
Parallax (π)	1.28±0.24 mas
Distance	approx. 2,500 ly (approx. 800 pc)
Absolute magnitude (M_{V})	−4.59

Details
Mass	8.8±0.2 M_{☉}
Radius	78 R_{☉}
Luminosity	5,798 L_{☉}
Surface gravity (log g)	1.68 cgs
Temperature	8,246 K
Metallicity [Fe/H]	−0.33 dex
Age	29.8±4.3 Myr

Other designations
- ι^{2} Sco, CD−40°11886, HD 161912, HIP 87294, HR 6631, SAO 228466

Database references
SIMBAD	data

ι^{2} Scorpii, Latinised as Iota^{2} Scorpii, is a single star in tail of the zodiac constellation of Scorpius. It has an apparent visual magnitude of +4.82, and is visible to the naked eye. Because of parallax measurement errors, the distance to this star is only approximately known: it lies around 2,500 light years away from the Sun. It has a visual companion, a magnitude 11.0 star at an angular separation of 31.60 arcseconds along a position angle of 36°, as of 2000.

In the literature, there are two different stellar classifications for this star: A2 Ib and A6 Ib. In either case it is an A-type supergiant star with an estimated age of 30 million years and a mass 8.8 times that of the Sun. It shines with a luminosity 5,798 times the Sun's from an outer atmosphere that has an effective temperature of 8,246 K. As with other stars of its type, ι^{2} Scorpii varies slightly in brightness, showing an amplitude of 0.05 in magnitude.
