= Iota1 Scorpii =

Star in the constellation Scorpius

ι^{1} Scorpii
- Location of ι^{1} Scorpii (circled)

Observation data Epoch J2000 Equinox J2000
- Constellation: Scorpius
- Right ascension: 17^{h} 47^{m} 35.08113^{s}
- Declination: −40° 07′ 37.1893″
- Apparent magnitude (V): 3.03

Characteristics
- Spectral type: F2 Ia
- U−B color index: +0.26
- B−V color index: +0.51

Astrometry
Radial velocity (R_{v})	−26.00 km/s
Proper motion (μ)	RA: +0.01 mas/yr Dec.: −6.24 mas/yr
Parallax (π)	1.69±0.15 mas
Distance	1,900 ± 200 ly (590 ± 50 pc)
Absolute magnitude (M_{V})	−6.51±0.19

Details
Mass	12.11±0.66 M_{☉}
Radius	120.3 R_{☉}
Luminosity	35,070 L_{☉}
Surface gravity (log g)	0.5 to 1.0 cgs
Temperature	6,910 or 7,103 K
Metallicity [Fe/H]	−0.13 to −0.11 dex
Age	17.0 ± 0.5 Myr

Other designations
- ι^{1} Sco, CD−40°11838, FK5 666, HD 161471, HIP 87073, HR 6615, SAO 228420

Database references
SIMBAD	data

Iota^{1} Scorpii, Latinized from ι^{1} Scorpii, is a star in the southern constellation of Scorpius. With an apparent visual magnitude of 3.03, this star can be seen with the naked eye. Parallax measurements place it at a distance of roughly 1,930 light-years (590 parsecs) from Earth, with a 9% margin of error. At the estimated distance, the apparent magnitude is diminished by 0.66 magnitudes due to intervening gas and dust between Earth and the star.

This star has a stellar classification of F2 Ia, with the 'Ia' luminosity class indicating this is a supergiant more luminous than typical supergiants. It has about 12 times the Sun's mass and is 35,000 times more luminous. The limb-darkened angular diameter of Iota^{1} Scorpii is estimated at 1.896±0.213 mas. At the estimated distance, this corresponds to a physical radius of 120.3 R_{☉}. The effective temperature of the photosphere is 6,910 or 7,103 K, which gives it a yellow-white hue typical of an F-type star.

Iota^{1} Scorpii has a 10th magnitude companion at an angular separation of 37.5 arcseconds, which, at the distance of this star, gives it a projected separation of 20,000 astronomical units (AU). As the relative separation of the two stars along the line of sight to the Earth is not known, however, this distance represents only a minimum value for their separation.
