= Scorpius =

Zodiac constellation in the southern celestial hemisphere

- Constellation
- List of stars in Scorpius
- Abbreviation: Sco
- Genitive: Scorpii
- Pronunciation: /ˈskɔːrpiəs/, genitive /ˈskɔːrpiaɪ/
- Symbolism: the Scorpion
- Right ascension: 16.8875^{h}
- Declination: −30.7367°
- Quadrant: SQ3
- Area: 497 sq. deg. (33rd)
- Main stars: 18
- Bayer/Flamsteed stars: 47
- Stars brighter than 3.00^{m}: 13
- Stars within 10.00 pc (32.62 ly): 3
- Brightest star: Antares (α Sco) (0.96^{m})
- Nearest star: Gliese 682
- Messier objects: 4
- Meteor showers: Alpha Scorpiids; Omega Scorpiids
- Bordering constellations: Sagittarius; Ophiuchus; Libra; Lupus; Norma; Ara; Corona Australis
- Visible at latitudes between +40° and −90°. Best visible at 21:00 (9 p.m.) during the month of July.

Scorpius is a zodiac constellation located in the Southern celestial hemisphere, where it sits near the center of the Milky Way, between Libra to the west and Sagittarius to the east. Scorpius is a constellation whose recognition predates Greek culture; it is one of the 48 constellations identified by the Greek astronomer Ptolemy in the second century.

== Features ==
=== Stars ===
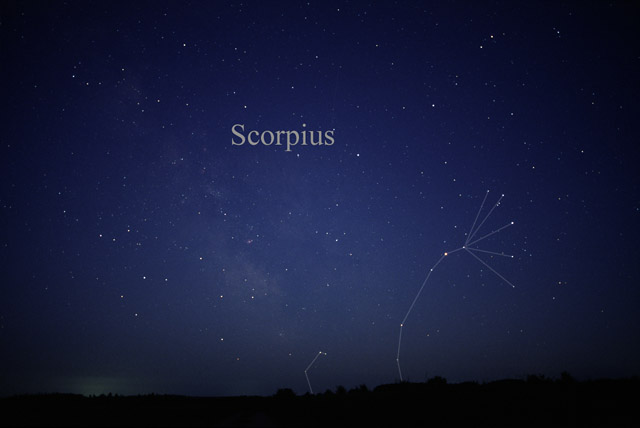
The constellation Scorpius as it can be seen by naked eye (with constellation lines drawn in).

Scorpius contains many bright stars, including Antares (α Sco), "rival of Mars," so named because of its distinct reddish hue; β^{1} Sco (Graffias or Acrab), a triple star; δ Sco (Dschubba, "the forehead"); θ Sco (Sargas, of Sumerian origin); ν Sco (Jabbah); ξ Sco; π Sco (Fang); σ Sco (Alniyat); and τ Sco (Paikauhale).

Marking the tip of the scorpion's curved tail are λ Sco (Shaula) and υ Sco (Lesath), whose names both mean "sting." Given their proximity to one another, λ Sco and υ Sco are sometimes referred to as the Cat's Eyes.

The constellation's bright stars form a pattern like a longshoreman's hook. Most of them are massive members of the nearest OB association: Scorpius–Centaurus.

The star δ Sco, after having been a stable 2.3 magnitude star, flared in July 2000 to 1.9 in a matter of weeks. It has since become a variable star fluctuating between 2.0 and 1.6. This means that at its brightest it is the second brightest star in Scorpius.

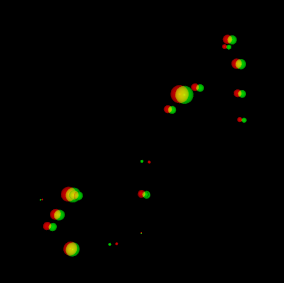
Stars of the constellation by distance (red-green 3D view) and the brightness of each star (star size)

U Scorpii is the fastest known nova, with a period of about 10 years.

AH Scorpii is a red supergiant star and one of the largest known stars, being 1,400 times larger than the Sun. It is also a luminous star, 340,000 times brighter than the Sun, although it is too faint to be seen by the naked eye, with a brightness varying from 6.5 to 9.6.

The close pair of stars ω^{1} Scorpii and ω² Scorpii are an optical double, which can be resolved by the unaided eye. One is a yellow giant, while the other is a blue B-type star in the Scorpius-Centaurus Association.

The star once designated γ Sco (despite being well within the boundaries of Libra) is today known as σ Lib. Moreover, the entire constellation of Libra was considered to be claws of Scorpius (Chelae Scorpionis) in Ancient Greek times, with a set of scales held aloft by Astraea (represented by adjacent Virgo) being formed from these westernmost stars during later Greek times. The division into Libra was formalised during Ancient Greek or Roman times.

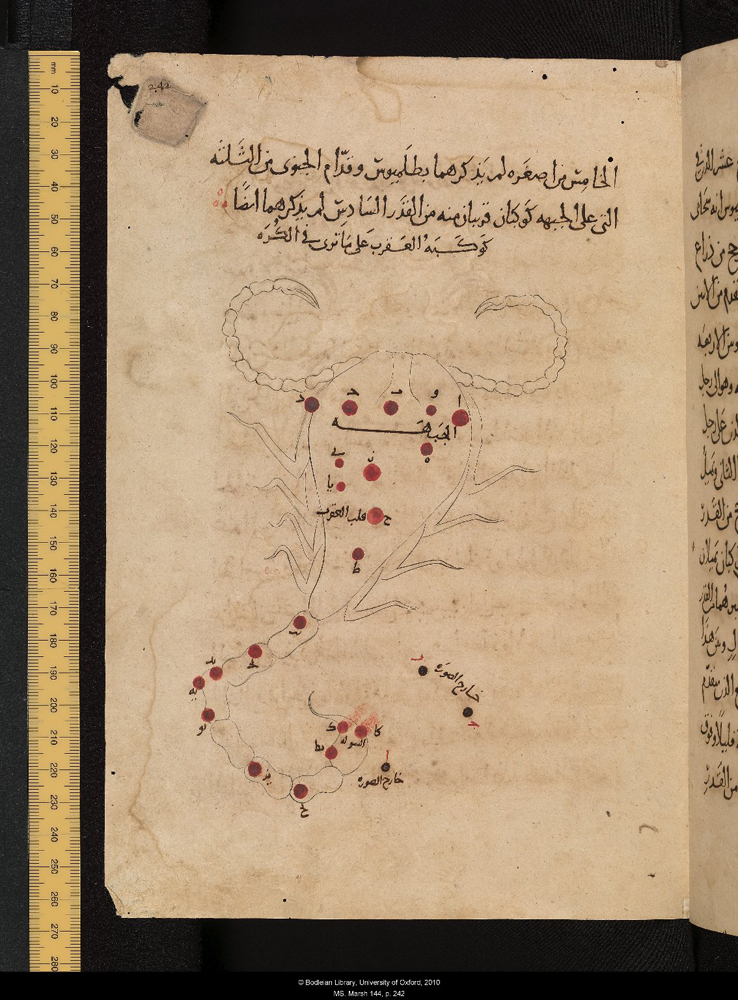
Scorpius from Al-Sufi's Book of Fixed Stars, dated 1009-10

=== Named stars ===
| Name | Bayer designation | Origin | Meaning | Light Years |
|---|---|---|---|---|
| Antares | α | Ancient Greek | Rival to Ares | 550 |
| Acrab | β | Arabic | the Scorpion | 470 |
| Dschubba | δ | Arabic | the Forehead of [the Scorpion] | 470 |
| Larawag | ε | Wardaman | Clear Sighting | 63.7 |
| Sargas | θ | Sumerian | Unknown | 329 |
| Shaula | λ | Arabic | the raised [tail] | 570 |
| Xamidimura | μ^{1} | Khoekhoe | The (two) Eyes of the Lion | 500 |
| Pipirima | μ^{2} | Tahitian | The Pair of Twins | 474 |
| Jabbah | ν | Arabic | the Crown of the Forehead | 470 |
| Fang | π | Chinese | Room | 590 |
| Iklil | ρ | Arabic | the Crown | 472 |
| Alniyat | σ | Arabic | the Arteries | 696 |
| Paikauhale | τ | Hawaiian | House-to-house Wanderer | 470 |
| Lesath | υ | Arabic | the Foggy Patch | 580 |
| Fuyue | G | Chinese | Fu Yue | 126 |

=== Deep-sky objects ===
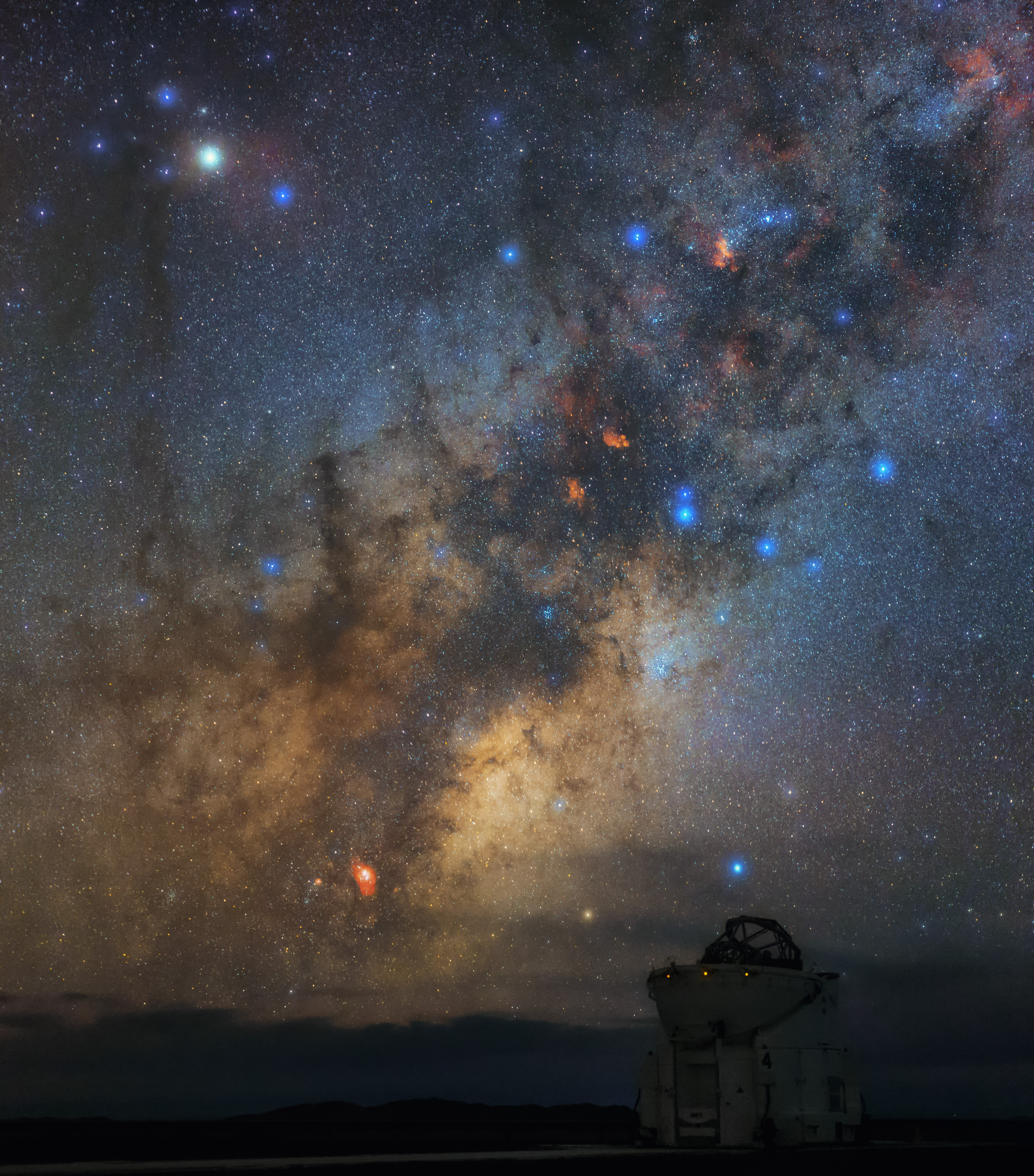
Scorpius and the Milky Way, with M4 and M80 visible near Antares, M6 and M7 just below centre, NGC 6124 at the top of the frame, and NGC 6334 just above centre.

Due to its location straddling the Milky Way, this constellation contains many deep-sky objects such as the open clusters Messier 6 (the Butterfly Cluster) and Messier 7 (the Ptolemy Cluster), NGC 6231 (by ζ² Sco), and the globular clusters Messier 4 and Messier 80.

Messier 80 (NGC 6093) is a globular cluster of magnitude 7.3, 33,000 light-years from Earth. It is a compact Shapley class II cluster; the classification indicates that it is highly concentrated and dense at its nucleus. M80 was discovered in 1781 by Charles Messier. It was the site of a rare discovery in 1860 when Arthur von Auwers discovered the nova T Scorpii.

NGC 6302, also called the Bug Nebula, is a bipolar planetary nebula. NGC 6334, also known as the Cat's Paw Nebula, is an emission nebula and star-forming region.

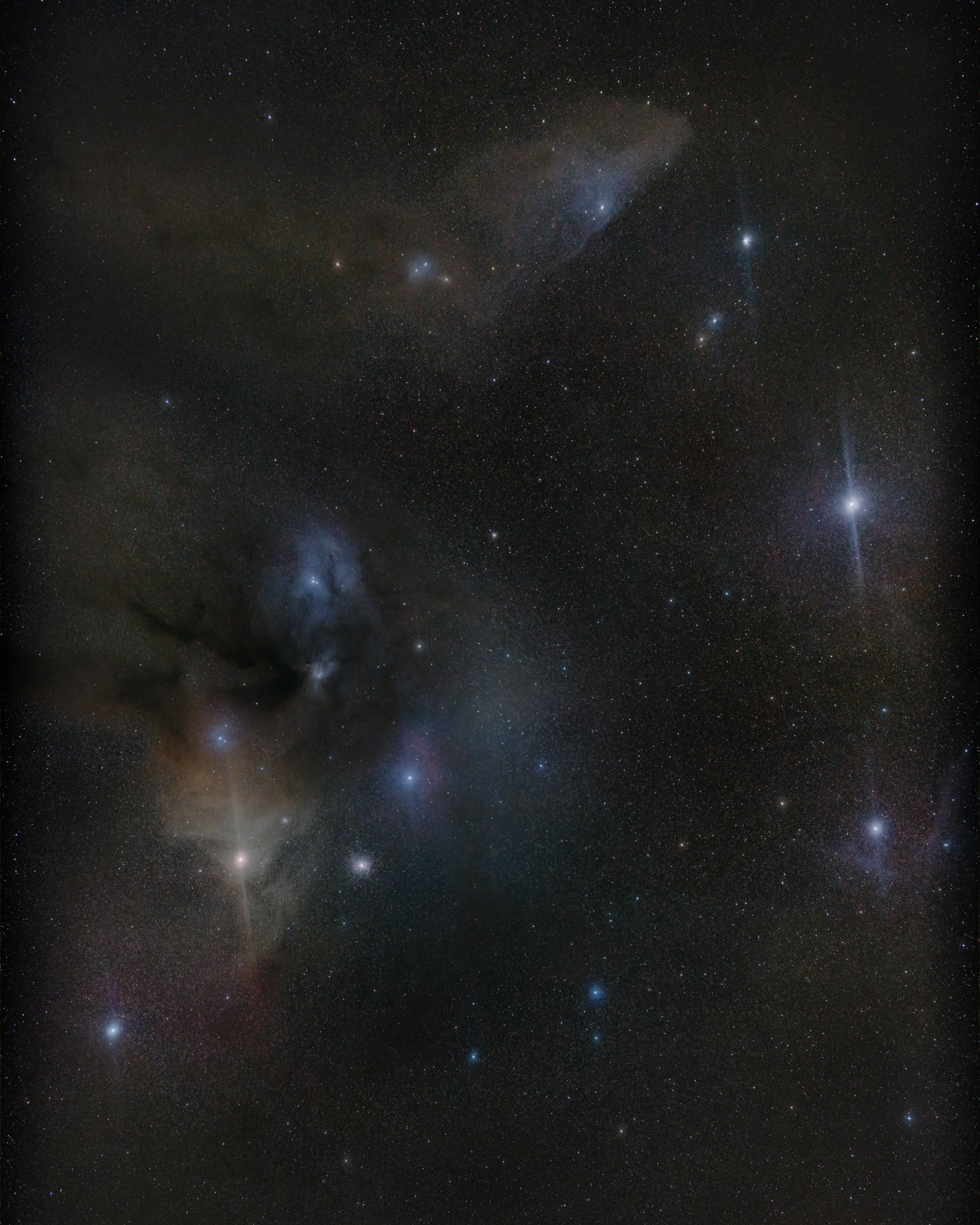
The heart of Scorpius. M4 is visible near the left of center. Portions of the Rho Ophiuchi cloud complex are illuminated by Antares and the other neighboring stars.

== History and mythology ==
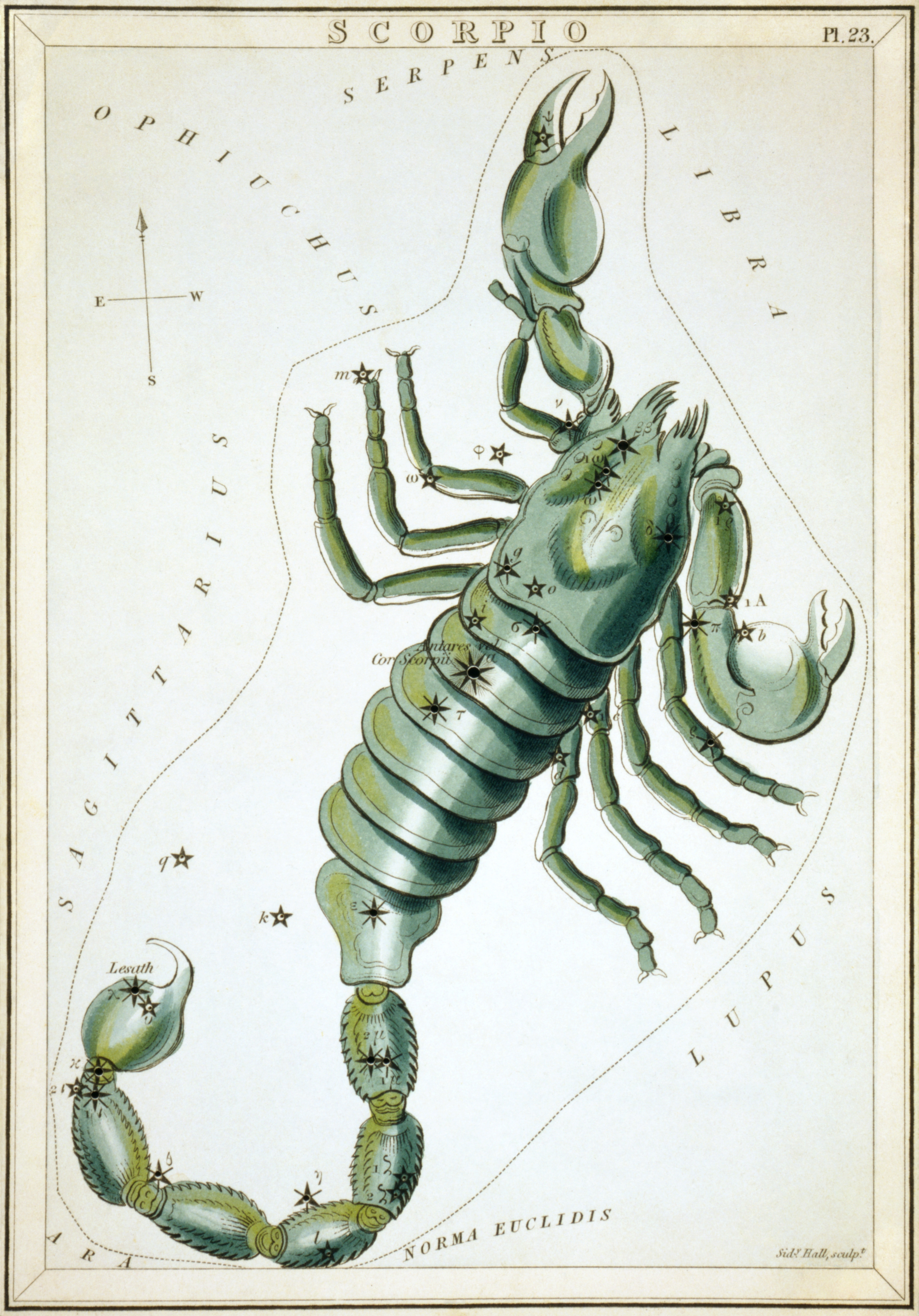
Scorpius as depicted in Urania's Mirror, a set of constellation cards published in London c.1825.

In Greek mythology, several myths associated with Scorpius attribute it to Orion. According to one version, Orion boasted to the goddess Artemis and her mother, Leto, that he would kill every animal on Earth. Artemis and Leto sent a giant scorpion to kill Orion. Their battle caught the attention of Zeus, who raised both combatants to the sky to serve as a reminder for mortals to curb their excessive pride. In another version of the myth, Artemis' twin brother, Apollo, was the one who sent the scorpion to kill Orion after the hunter earned the goddess' favor by admitting she was better than him. After Zeus raised Orion and the scorpion to the sky, the former hunts every winter but flees every summer when the scorpion comes. In both versions, Artemis asked Zeus to raise Orion.

In a Greek myth without Orion, the celestial scorpion encountered Phaethon while he was driving his father Helios' Sun Chariot.

=== In non-Western astronomy ===
The Babylonians called this constellation MUL.GIR.TAB - the 'Scorpion'; the signs can be literally read as 'the (creature with) a burning sting'.

In some old descriptions the constellation of Libra is treated as the Scorpion's claws. Libra was known as the Claws of the Scorpion in Babylonian (zibānītu (compare Arabic zubānā)) and in Greek (χηλαι).

The Javanese people of Indonesia call this constellation Banyakangrem ("the brooded swan") or Kalapa Doyong ("leaning coconut tree") due to the shape similarity. The Old Javanese 11th century text Agastyaparva however considers Scorpius as having the shape of a broken axe handle (sangkal tikel).

Māui's fish hook

In Hawaii, Scorpius is known as the demigod Maui's Big Fishhook (Ka Makau Nui o Māui) or Manaiakalani. To the Tahitians, the descent of this same constellation (in Tahitian: Matau a Maui) beneath their horizon on November 30th marks a ban lift on fishing of tuna beginning fishing season, as well as the gathering of wild fruits (poropa).

Scorpius was divided into two asterisms which were used by Bugis sailors for navigation. The northern part of Scorpius (α, β, γ or σ Lib, δ, ε, ζ, μ, σ and τ Scorpii) was called bintoéng lambarué, meaning "skate stars". The southern part of Scorpius (η, θ, ι, κ, λ and ν Scorpii) was called bintoéng balé mangngiwéng, meaning "shark stars".

== In culture ==
In the flag of Brazil, Scorpius represents the Northeast region of Brazil, except Bahia, which is part of Crux.

== Astrology ==
The Western astrological sign Scorpio differs from the astronomical constellation. Astronomically, the Sun is in Scorpius's IAU boundaries for just six days, from November 23 to November 28. Much of the difference is due to the constellation Ophiuchus, which is used by few astrologers. Scorpius corresponds to the Hindu nakshatras Anuradha, Jyeshtha, and Mula.

== See also ==
- Scorpius (Chinese astronomy)
