= Eta Scorpii =

Binary star in the constellation Scorpius

η Scorpii
- Location of η Sco (circled)

Observation data Epoch J2000 Equinox ICRS
- Constellation: Scorpius
- η Sco A
- Right ascension: 17^{h} 12^{m} 09.19565^{s}
- Declination: −43° 14′ 21.0905″
- Apparent magnitude (V): 3.33
- η Sco B
- Right ascension: 17^{h} 12^{m} 51.49828^{s}
- Declination: −43° 20′ 31.0692″
- Apparent magnitude (V): 11.23±0.01

Characteristics

η Sco A
- Spectral type: F5 IV
- U−B color index: +0.09
- B−V color index: +0.41

Astrometry

η Sco A
Radial velocity (R_{v})	−27.0 km/s
Proper motion (μ)	RA: +24.47 mas/yr Dec.: −288.55 mas/yr
Parallax (π)	44.39±0.16 mas
Distance	73.5 ± 0.3 ly (22.53 ± 0.08 pc)
Absolute magnitude (M_{V})	+1.58

η Sco B
Radial velocity (R_{v})	−23.36±0.18 km/s
Proper motion (μ)	RA: +24.01 mas/yr Dec.: −288.55 mas/yr
Parallax (π)	44.7788±0.0324 mas
Distance	72.84 ± 0.05 ly (22.33 ± 0.02 pc)

Details

η Sco A
Mass	1.60+0.01 −0.23 M_{☉}
Radius	3.307±0.050 R_{☉}
Luminosity	17.94±0.45 L_{☉}
Surface gravity (log g)	3.65±0.20 cgs
Temperature	6,533±46 K
Metallicity [Fe/H]	−0.29±0.10 dex
Rotational velocity (v sin i)	150 km/s
Age	1.1 Gyr

η Sco B
Mass	0.527±0.017 M_{☉}
Radius	0.524±0.017 R_{☉}
Luminosity	0.050±0.001 L_{☉}
Temperature	3,643±121 K

Other designations
- η Sco, CD−43 11485, FK5 638, GJ 657, HD 155203, HIP 84143, HR 6380, SAO 227707, WDS J17122-4314

Database references
SIMBAD	Eta Scorpii A
- Eta Scorpii B

Eta Scorpii, Latinized from η Scorpii, is a binary star in the southern zodiac constellation of Scorpius. With an apparent visual magnitude of 3.33, this is one of the brighter members of Scorpius and is the most southerly of the constellation's stars with a Bayer designation. The distance to this system can be estimated using parallax measurements, yielding values of 73.48 ± 0.26 light-years (22.53 ± 0.08 parsecs) for the primary and 72.84 ± 0.05 ly (22.333 ± 0.015 pc) for the secondary.

== Characteristics ==
The two components of this system are separated by 9.87" in the sky, and were identified as a gravitationally bound pair in 2018 with data from the Gaia spacecraft.

The stellar classification of the primary star, Eta Scorpii A, has undergone some revision over time, with the star being classified anywhere from an F-type main sequence star to a giant star. In 2006, the NStars program assigned it a class of F5 IV, where the luminosity class of 'IV' indicates this is a subgiant star that is exhausting the supply of hydrogen at its core and is in the process of evolving into a giant star. It has around 1.6 times the Sun's mass with an estimated age of 1.1 billion years. The star is radiating about 18 times the luminosity of the Sun from its outer atmosphere at an effective temperature of 6,533 K. It is this heat that gives it a yellow-white hue that is typical for an F-type star.

Eta Scorpii A is rotating rapidly, with a projected rotational velocity of 150 km s^{−1}. This is causing the star to spin on its axis with a period of less than a day. It is an X-ray emitter with its stellar corona giving off an X-ray luminosity of 4.4×10^{28} ergs s^{−1}. In 1991 it was identified as a possible barium star, as it displays an enhanced abundance of the element barium in its spectrum. Overall, the abundance of elements other than hydrogen and helium, what astronomers term the star's metallicity, is similar to the abundance in the Sun.

The secondary component, Eta Scorpii B, also designated L 413-148, has a much fainter apparent magnitude of +11.23. It has no published spectral type. The star has roughly 0.53 times the mass of the Sun and 0.52 times the radius. It is radiating about 5% of the Sun's luminosity at an effective temperature of approximately 3,600 K.
