= Tail (Chinese constellation) =

Chinese constellation

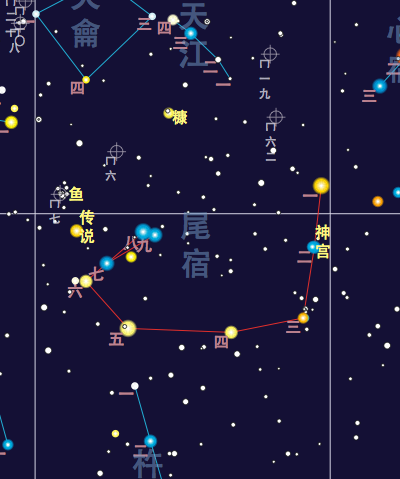
Wěi Xiù map

The Tail mansion (尾宿, pinyin: Wěi Xiù) is one of the Twenty-eight mansions of the Chinese constellations. It is one of the eastern mansions of the Azure Dragon.

== Asterisms ==
English name	Chinese name	European constellation	Number of stars	Representing
Tail	尾	Scorpius	9	Azure Dragon's tail, refer to the temple
Changing Room	simplified Chinese: 神宫; traditional Chinese: 神宮	Scorpius	1	Changing rooms in the temple
Tortoise	simplified Chinese: 龟; traditional Chinese: 龜	Ara	5	Galaxy in the turtle, refer to the good and bad
Celestial River	天江	Ophiuchus	4	The silver-river-shaped galaxy
Fuyue	simplified Chinese: 傅说; traditional Chinese: 傅說	Scorpius	1	Fu Yue was a former slave that became a high-ranking minister to Shang dynasty ruler, Wu Ding
Fish	simplified Chinese: 鱼; traditional Chinese: 魚	Scorpius	1	Fish in the galaxy
