= Anuradha (nakshatra) =

Lunar mansion in Hundu astrology

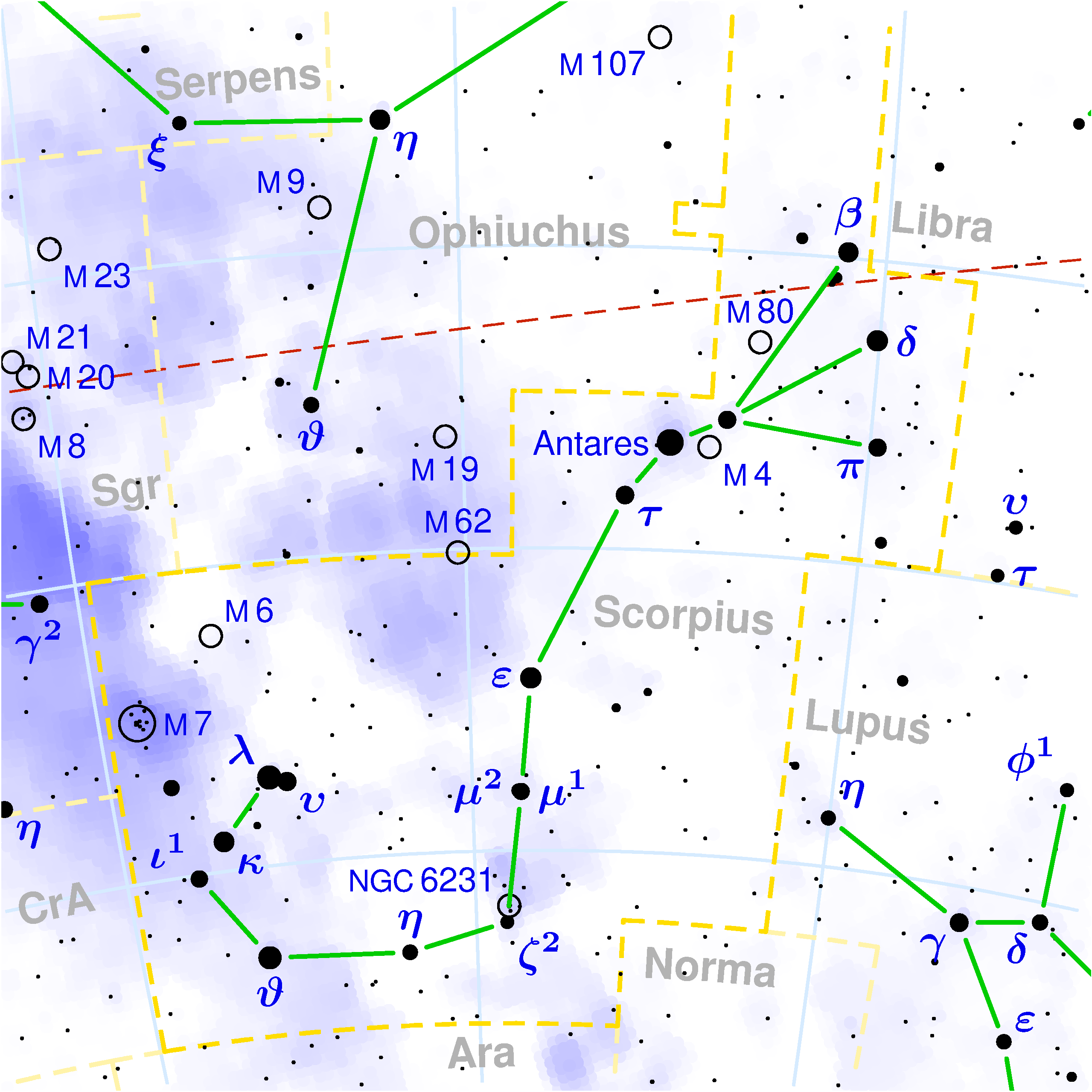
Anuradha found in Scorpius Constellation

Anuradha (अनुराधा), meaning "following Radha", is the seventeenth nakshatra (lunar mansion) in Indian astronomy and astrology, having a spread from 3°20' to 16°40'. It corresponds to the line of stars formed by β, δ, π and ρ Scorpii in the constellation Scorpius, which also form the Chinese lunar mansion Fang (Room).

In astrology, Anuradha is ruled by Shani (Saturn). Mitra is the deity for Anuradha Nakshatra. Anuradha is a fragile nakshatra with the shakti power of granting abundance. Anuradha rules the breasts, stomach, womb and bowels.

== See also ==
- Archaeoastronomy and Vedic chronology
- History of astrology
- Indian astronomy
- Nadi astrology
- Synoptical astrology
- Tau Scorpii – Star in the constellation of Scorpius
