= 62 Sagittarii =

Star in the constellation of Sagittarius

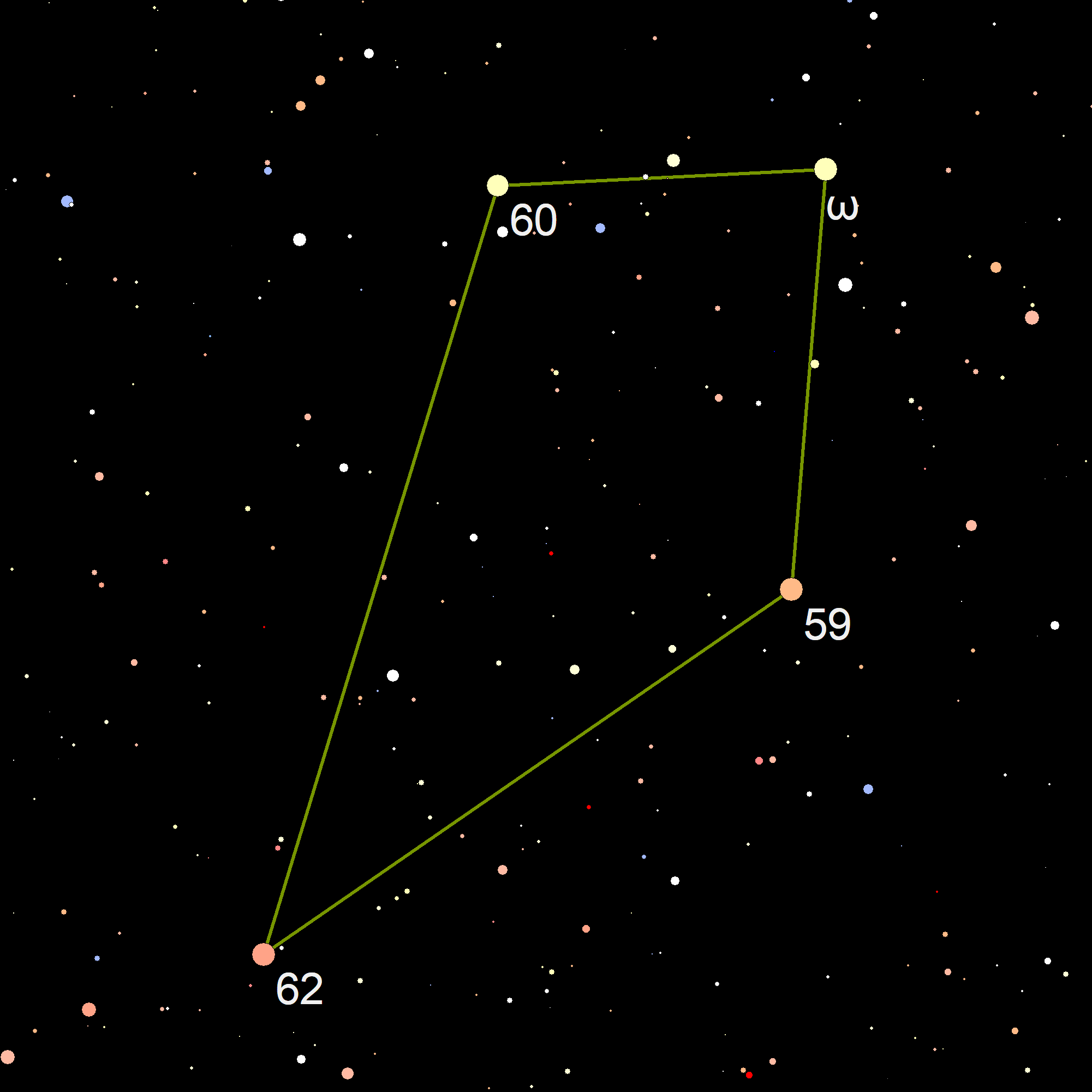
- The four stars of the Terebellum

Observation data Epoch J2000.0 Equinox J2000.0 (ICRS)
- Constellation: Sagittarius
- Right ascension: 20^{h} 02^{m} 39.48097^{s}
- Declination: −27° 42′ 35.4443″
- Apparent magnitude (V): 4.45 to 4.64

Characteristics
- Evolutionary stage: AGB
- Spectral type: M4.5III
- U−B color index: +1.80
- B−V color index: +1.65
- R−I color index: +1.56
- Variable type: LB

Astrometry
Radial velocity (R_{v})	+9.9±0.8 km/s
Proper motion (μ)	RA: +32.97 mas/yr Dec.: +14.00 mas/yr
Parallax (π)	7.27±0.18 mas
Distance	450 ± 10 ly (138 ± 3 pc)
Absolute magnitude (M_{V})	−1.26

Details
Radius	72+16 −6 R_{☉}
Luminosity	1,107±74 L_{☉}
Temperature	3,915+168 −380 K
Rotational velocity (v sin i)	1.5±1.5 km/s

Other designations
- Gouguo, c Sgr, 62 Sgr, V3872 Sagittarii, CD−28°16355, CPD−28°7105, FK5 753, GC 27763, HD 189763, HIP 98688, HR 7650, SAO 188844, PPM 270603

Database references
SIMBAD	data

62 Sagittarii, also named Gouguo, is a single, variable star in the constellation of Sagittarius. It is visible to the naked eye with an apparent visual magnitude that varies between 4.45 and 4.64, and, at its peak, it is the brightest of the four stars in the Terebellum asterism. This star is located approximately 450 light-years from the Sun based on parallax, and is drifting further away with a radial velocity of +10 km/s.

== Nomenclature ==
It has the Bayer designation c Sagittarii and the variable star designation V3872 Sagittarii, while 62 Sagittarii is its Flamsteed designation. This object forms the southwest corner of the asterism called the Terebellum. 62 Sagittarii is the star in the Terebellum which is most distant from its centre; it is 1.72° from its northwest corner, 60 Sagittarii, and 1.37° from its southeast corner, 59 Sagittarii.

In Chinese astronomy, the same asterism is called Gǒu Guó (狗国), meaning "land of dogs" or "dog kingdom". The exact meaning is unclear: it may represent an area for dogs around a farm, a nation in Chinese legend (that appears in Matteo Ricci's world map), or the non-Han peoples of northern and northeastern China. The IAU Working Group on Star Names adopted the name Gouguo for 62 Sagittarii on 13 August 2026, after this Chinese constellation; the name Terebellum was assigned to ω Sagittarii.

== Properties ==
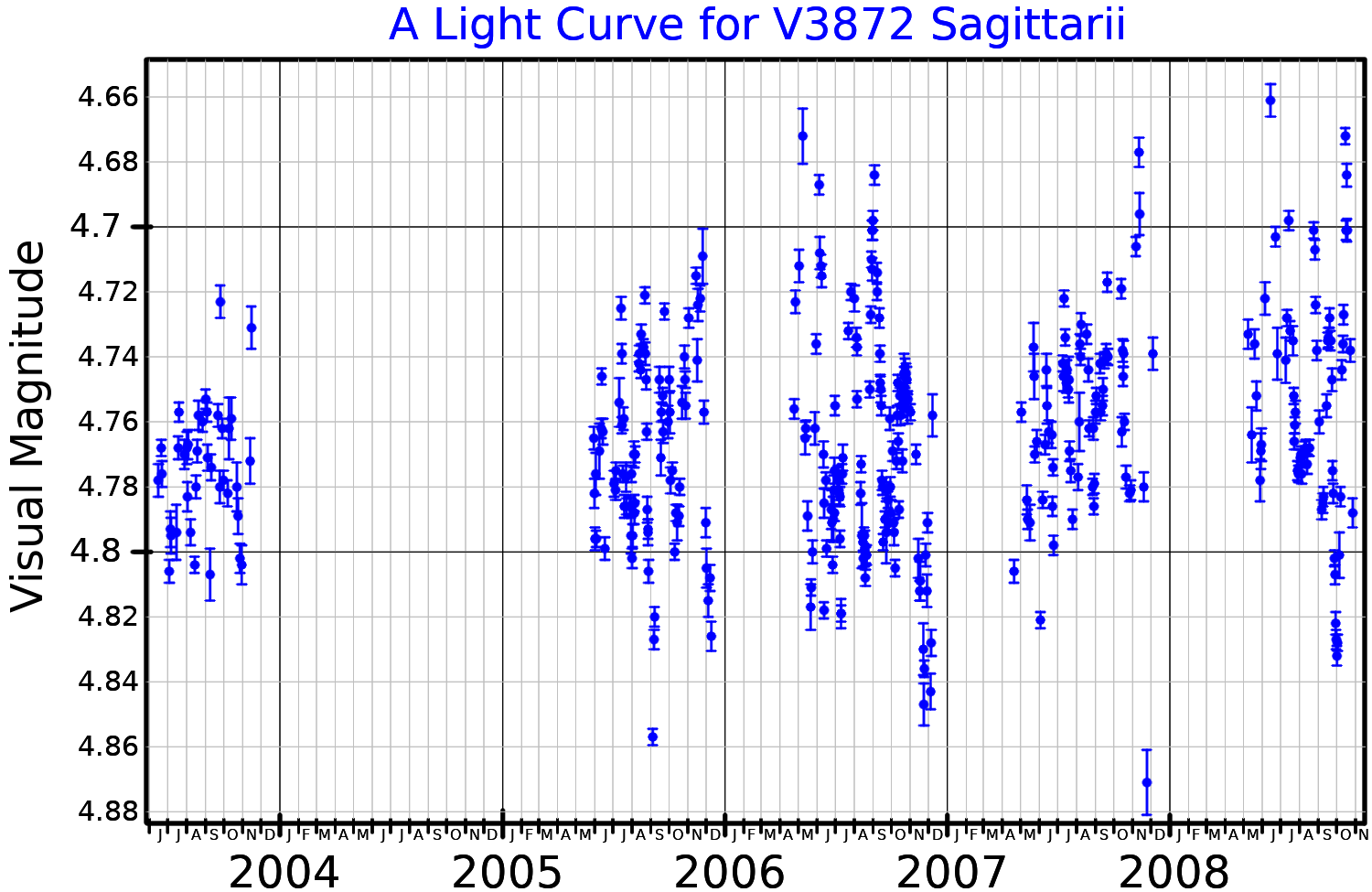
A visual band light curve for V3872 Sagittarii, adapted from data published by Tabur et al. (2009)

This is an aging red giant with a stellar classification of M4.5III, a star that has exhausted the supply of hydrogen at its core and expanded to around 72 times the Sun's radius. In 1879, Benjamin Apthorp Gould listed the star as a variable star in his Uranometria Argentina. It was given its variable star designation in 1973. It is a slow irregular variable with multiple pulsation periods. The star is radiating about 1,100 times the luminosity of the Sun from its swollen photosphere at an effective temperature of 3,915 K.

Pulsation periods of 62 Sagittarii
Period (days)	24.0	30.4	31.3	42.8	50.5	234.7
Amplitude (mag.)	0.027	0.019	0.043	0.042	0.022	0.018
