= Asterism (astronomy) =

Pattern of stars recognized on Earth's night sky

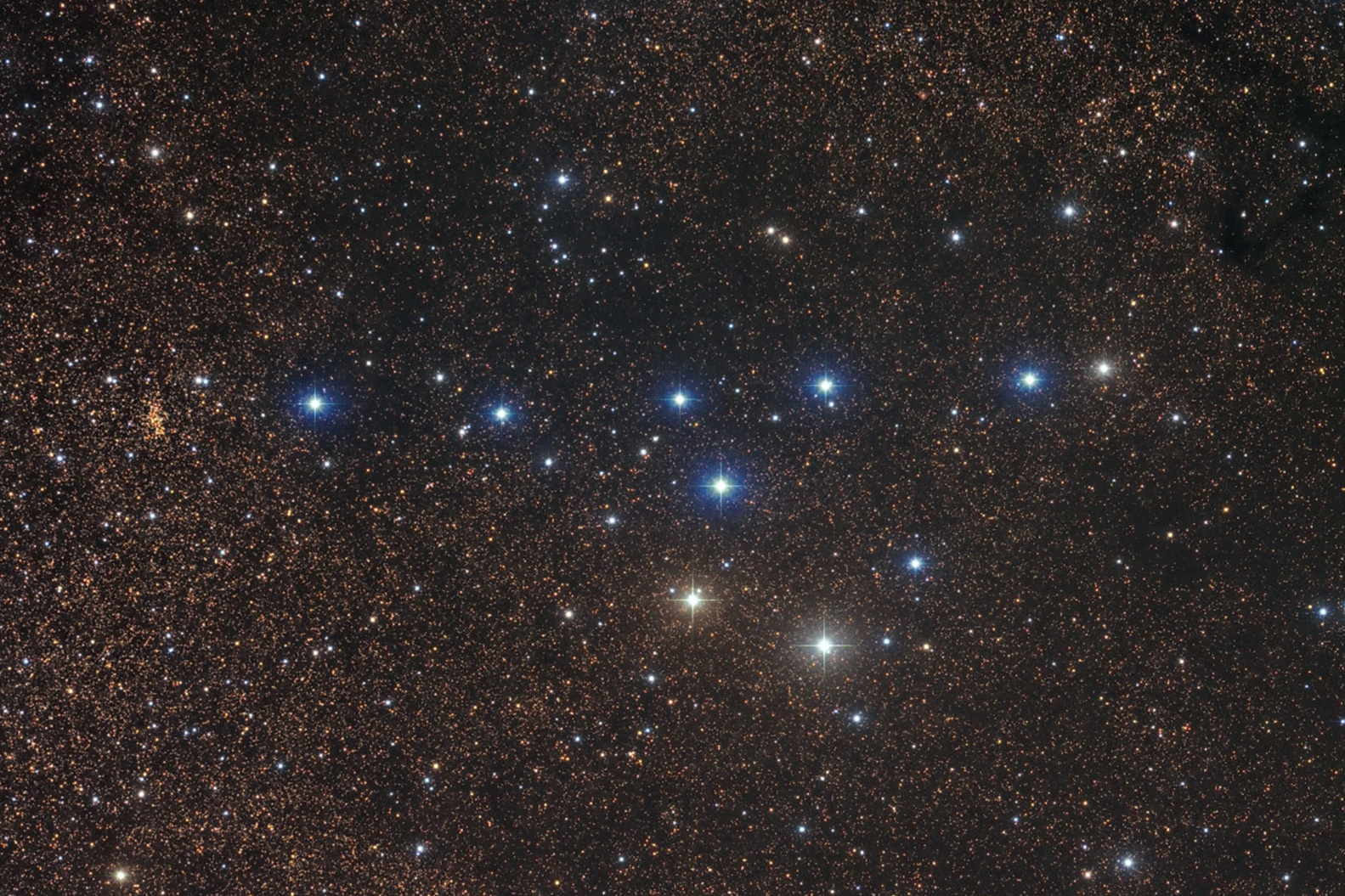
The bright stars in this photo form the asterism Brocchi's Cluster in the constellation Vulpecula, also known as "The Coathanger."

An asterism is an observed pattern or group of stars in the sky. Asterisms can be any identified star pattern, and therefore are a more general concept than the 88 formally defined constellations. Constellations are based upon asterisms, but unlike asterisms, constellations are defined regions with official boundaries which together encompass the entire sky.

Asterisms range from simple shapes of just a few stars to more complex collections of many stars covering large portions of the sky. The stars themselves may be bright naked-eye objects or fainter, even telescopic, but they are generally all of a similar brightness to each other. The larger brighter asterisms are useful for people who are familiarizing themselves with the night sky.

The patterns of stars seen in asterisms are not necessarily a product of any physical association between the stars, but are rather the result of the particular perspectives of their observations. For example the Summer Triangle is a purely observational, physically unrelated group of stars, but the stars of Orion's Belt are all members of the Orion OB1 association and five of the seven stars of the Big Dipper are members of the Ursa Major Moving Group. Physical associations, such as the Hyades or Pleiades, can be asterisms in their own right and also part of other asterisms.

== Background of asterisms and constellations ==
In many early civilizations, it was common to associate groups of stars in connect-the-dots stick-figure patterns. Some of the earliest records are those of ancient India in the Vedanga Jyotisha and the Babylonians. Different cultures identified different constellations, although a few of the more obvious patterns tend to appear in the constellations of multiple cultures, such as those of Orion and Scorpius. As anyone could arrange and name a grouping of stars there was no distinct difference between a constellation and an asterism. For example, Pliny the Elder mentions 72 asterisms in his book Naturalis Historia.

A general list containing 48 constellations likely began to develop with the astronomer Hipparchus (c. 190 – c. 120 BCE). As constellations were considered to be composed only of the stars that constituted the figure, it was always possible to use any leftover stars to create and squeeze in a new grouping among the established constellations.

Exploration by Europeans to other parts of the globe exposed them to stars previously unknown to them. Two astronomers particularly known for greatly expanding the number of southern constellations were Johann Bayer (1572–1625) and Nicolas Louis de Lacaille (1713–1762). Bayer had listed twelve figures made out of stars that were too far south for Ptolemy to have seen. Lacaille created 14 new groups, mostly for the area surrounding South Celestial Pole. Many of these proposed constellations have been formally accepted, but the rest have remained as asterisms.

In 1928, the International Astronomical Union (IAU) precisely divided the sky into 88 official constellations following geometric boundaries encompassing all of the stars within them. Any additional new selected groupings of stars or former constellations are often considered as asterisms. However, technical distinctions between the terms 'constellation' and 'asterism' often remain somewhat ambiguous.

== Asterisms consisting of first-magnitude stars ==
Some asterisms consist completely of bright first-magnitude stars, which mark out simple geometric shapes.

- The Summer Triangle of Deneb, Altair, and Vega – α Cygni, α Aquilae, and α Lyrae – is prominent in the northern hemisphere summer skies, as its three stars are all of the 1st magnitude. The stars of the Triangle are in the band of the Milky Way which marks the galactic equator, and are in the direction of the Galactic Center.
- The Winter Triangle is visible in the northern sky's winter and comprises the first magnitude stars Betelgeuse, Sirius and Procyon (the second and fourth closest star or star system visible without aid).
  - The larger northern Winter Hexagon includes seven of the twenty-two first-magnitude stars visible in the sky, with Pollux, Capella, Aldebaran, Rigel, Sirius and Procyon, and with the 2nd-magnitude Castor on the periphery, and Betelgeuse off-center. Adding Betelgeuse then it is known as the Heavenly 'G'. It encircles the galactic anticenter, as well as incorporates constellations such as Gemini and Orion. It also includes in the background of Aldebaran the Hyades, the nearest star cluster and one of five first-magnitude deep-sky objects, two of which can be seen just north-east of the Hyades, the Pleiades also in Taurus and the Alpha Persei Cluster (with Alcyone and Mirfak as the brightest stars).
- The northern Spring Triangle consists of Arcturus, Regulus and Spica.
  - The Great Diamond consisting of Arcturus, Spica, Denebola and Cor Caroli, the latter two not being first-magnitude stars. An east-west line from Arcturus to Denebola forms an equilateral triangle with Cor Caroli to the North, and another with Spica to the South. Together these two triangles form the Diamond. Formally, the stars of the Diamond are in the constellations Boötes, Virgo, Leo, and Canes Venatici.

Other asterisms consist partially of multiple first-magnitude stars.

- The Southern Cross including the first-magnitude stars Acrux and Mimosa, west of the Carina Nebula (one of five first-magnitude deep-sky objects), and with the first-magnitude stars Alpha Centauri (the closest star to the Sun) and Beta Centauri pointing at the cross, distinguishing the cross from less bright and similar asterisms like the Diamond Cross or False Cross.

All other first-magnitude stars are the only such stars in their asterisms or constellations, with Canopus in the Argo Navis asterism south of Sirius, visually east of the Carina Nebula and near the Large Magellanic Cloud (both being first-magnitude deep-sky objects), Achernar in the constellation Eridanus east of Canopus, Fomalhaut in Piscis Austrinus east of Achernar and Antares in Scorpius visually near the Galactic Center.

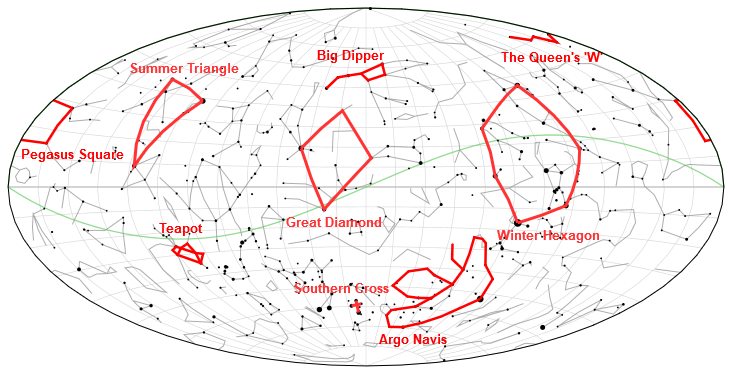
Some major asterisms on a celestial map (the projection exaggerates the stretching)

== Constellation-based asterisms ==
The Big Dipper asterism

- The Big Dipper, also known as The Plough or Charles's Wain, is composed of the seven brightest stars in Ursa Major. These stars delineate the Bear's hindquarters and exaggerated tail, or alternatively, the "handle" forming the upper outline of the bear's head and neck. With its longer tail, Ursa Minor hardly appears bearlike at all, and is widely known by its pseudonym, the Little Dipper.
- The Northern Cross in Cygnus. The upright runs from Deneb (α Cyg) in the Swan's tail to Albireo (β Cyg) in the beak. The transverse runs from ε Cygni in one wing to δ Cygni in the other.
- The Southern Cross is an asterism by name, but the whole area is now recognised as the constellation Crux. The main stars are Alpha, Beta, Gamma, Delta, and arguably also Epsilon Crucis. Earlier, Crux was deemed an asterism when Bayer created it in Uranometria (1603) from the stars in the hind legs of Centaurus, decreasing the size of Centaur. These same stars were probably identified by Pliny the Elder in his Naturalis Historia as the asterism 'Thronos Caesaris.'
- The Fish Hook is the traditional Hawaiian name for Scorpius. The image will be even more obvious if the chart's lines from Antares (α Sco) to Beta Scorpii (β Sco) and Pi Scorpii (π Sco) are replaced with a line from Beta through Delta Scorpii (δ Sco) to Pi forming a large capped "J." Adding vertical lines to connect the limbs at the left and right in the main diagram of Hercules will complete the figure of the Butterfly.
- Boötes is sometimes known as the Ice Cream Cone. It is also known as the Kite.
- The stars of Cassiopeia form a W which is often used as a nickname.
- The Great Square of Pegasus is the quadrilateral formed by the stars Markab, Scheat, Algenib, and Alpheratz, representing the body of the winged horse. The asterism was recognized as the constellation ASH.IKU "The Field" on the MUL.APIN cuneiform tablets from about 1100 to 700 BC. Alpheratz is now only considered a part of the constellation Andromeda whereas formerly the star was a part of both constellations.
- The Bowl of Virgo is formed by the stars Beta, Gamma, Delta, Epsilon and Eta Virginis. Together with Spica, they form a Y shape.

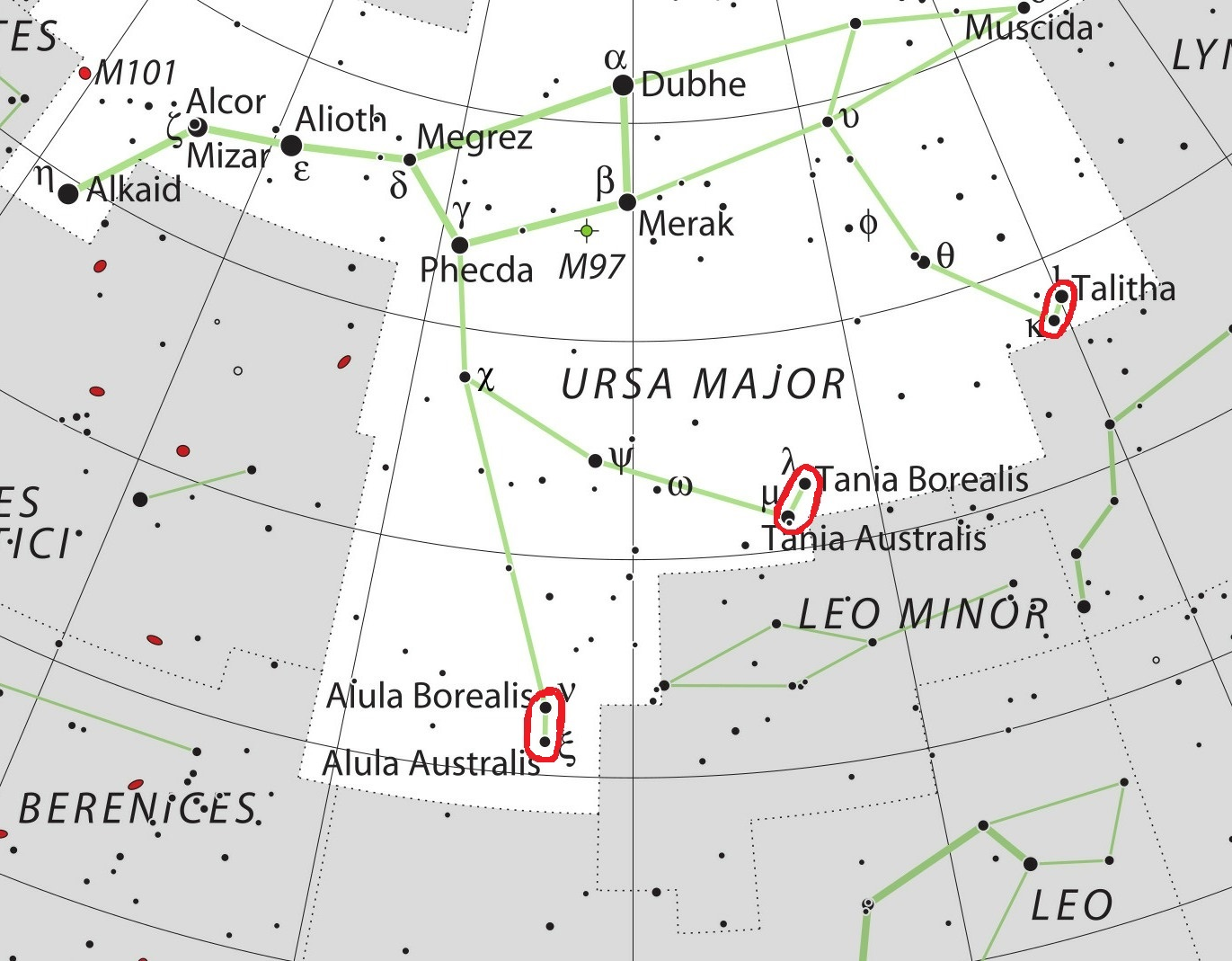
Three Leaps of the Gazelle asterism

- The Three Leaps of the Gazelle consists of three pairs of stars in Ursa Major aligned in a row spanning about 30 degrees. In Arabic lore, the star pairs are pictured as the hoof prints of a gazelle startled from a pond by Leo the lion. (The "pond" is pictured as the Coma Star Cluster.) The first pair of stars are Xi and Nu, second pair Upsilon and Lambda, third pair Kappa and Iota Ursa Majoris. The pairs also mark three of the bear's paws.

Some asterisms refer to portions of traditional constellation figures. These include:

- The Water Jar or Urn of Aquarius is a Y-shaped figure centered upon Zeta Aquarii and includes Gamma, Eta and Pi. It pours water in a stream of more than 20 stars terminating with the star Fomalhaut.
- The Crab Breast of Cancer (mentioned by Ptolemy) is a quadrilateral formed by the four stars Gamma, Delta, Eta and Theta Cancri which make up the carapace (inner shell) of the Crab. Contained within is the Beehive Cluster (Messier 44) which includes Epsilon Cancri.
- The Snake Head is the westernmost portion of Hydra consisting of the stars Delta, Epsilon, Zeta, Eta, Rho and Sigma Hydrae.
- Orion's Belt consists of the three bright stars Zeta (Alnitak), Epsilon (Alnilam) and Delta Orionis (Mintaka) which form the belt of Orion.
- Orion's Sword which hangs from Orion's Belt consists of the stars 42 Orionis, Theta Orionis, Iota Orionis, and centered upon M42, the Orion Nebula.
- The Bull's Face of Taurus is a V-shaped figure formed by prominent members of the Hyades cluster, including stars Gamma, Delta^{1}, Delta^{2}, Delta^{3}, Epsilon, Theta Tauri, as well as the bright star Alpha Tauri (Aldebaran) which forms the red eye of the Bull.

== Other particular asterisms ==
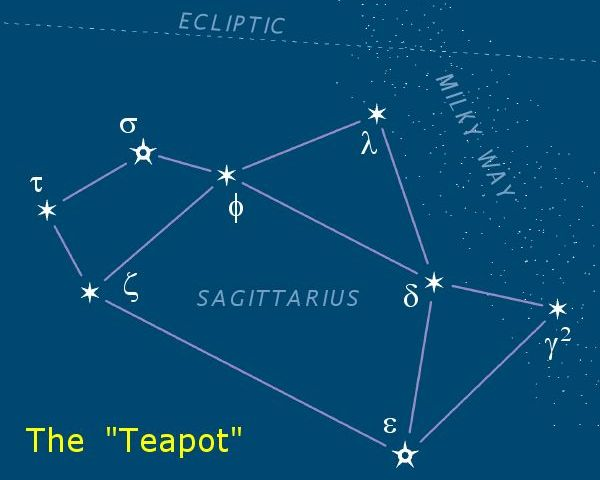
The "Teapot" asterism in Sagittarius. The Milky Way appears as "steam" coming from the spout.

Other asterisms are also composed of stars from one constellation, but do not refer to the traditional figures.

- Four stars (Beta, Upsilon, Theta, and Omega Carinae) form a well-shaped diamond – the Diamond Cross.
- The Saucepan or Pot, being the same stars as the Belt and Sword of Orion. The end of the handle is at ι Orionis, with the far rim at η Orionis.
- The four central stars in Hercules, Epsilon (ε Her), Zeta (ζ Her), Eta (η Her), and Pi (π Her), form the Keystone. The bright globular cluster Messier 13 lies along the western segment, between Zeta and Eta.
- The curve of stars at the front end of the Lion from Epsilon (ε Leo) to Regulus (α Leo), looking much like a mirror-image question mark, has long been known as the Sickle.
- The brighter stars of Sagittarius form the Teapot. (The Large Sagittarius Star Cloud appears to be steam emerging from the "spout".)
- Northeast of the Teapot asterism lies the fainter Teaspoon, consisting of the stars ξ^{1}, ξ^{2}, ο, π, ρ^{1} and ρ^{2} Sagitarii.
- Four bright stars in Delphinus (Sualocin or α Delphini, Rotanev or β Delphini, γ Delphini and δ Delphini) form Job's Coffin.
- The Terebellum is a small quadrilateral of four faint stars (Omega, 59, 60, 62) in Sagittarius' hindquarters.
- Just south of Pegasus, the western fish of Pisces is home to the Circlet formed from Gamma (γ Piscium), Kappa (κ Piscium), Lambda (λ Piscium), TX Piscium, Iota (ι Piscium), and Theta (θ Piscium).
- Dubhe and Merak (Alpha and Beta Ursae Majoris), the two stars at the end of the bowl of the Big Dipper are often called the Pointers: a line from β to α and continued for about five times the distance between them arrives at the North Celestial Pole and the star Polaris (α UMi/Alpha Ursae Minoris), the North Star.
- Rigil Kentaurus (α Centauri) and Hadar (β Centauri) are the Southern Pointers leading to the Southern Cross and thus helping to distinguish Crux from the False Cross.

== Asterisms across multiple constellations ==
Other asterisms that are formed from stars in more than one constellation.

- The Egyptian X is a large asterism which, like the Diamond of Virgo, is composed of a pair of equilateral triangles. Sirius (α CMa), Procyon (α CMi), and Betelgeuse (α Ori) form one to the North (Winter Triangle) while Sirius, Naos (ζ Pup), and Phakt (α Col) form another to the South. Unlike the Diamond, however, these triangles meet, not base-to-base, but vertex-to-vertex. The name derives from both the shape and, because the stars straddle the Celestial Equator, it is more easily seen from south of the Mediterranean than in Europe.
- The Lozenge is a small diamond formed from three stars – Eltanin, Grumium, and Rastaban (Gamma, Xi, and Beta Draconis) – in the head of Draco and one – Iota Herculis – in the foot of Hercules.
- The diamond-shaped False Cross is composed of the four stars Alsephina (δ Velorum), Markeb (κ Velorum), Avior (ε Carinae), and Aspidiske (ι Carinae). Although its component stars are not quite as bright as those of the Southern Cross, it is somewhat larger and better shaped than the Southern Cross, for which it is sometimes mistaken, causing errors in astronavigation. Like the Southern Cross, three of its main four stars are whitish and one orange.
- The Northern Y is formed by four prominent stars, Arcturus (α Boötis), Seginus (γ Boötis), Alphecca (α Coronae Borealis), and centered on Izar (ε Boötis). From the United Kingdom in particular, where there is serious light pollution in many areas and also twilight much of the night when these constellations appear, this "Y" is often visible while other stars of Boötes and Corona Borealis are not.
- The Lightning Bolt, aligned north to south, consists of the stars Epsilon Pegasi, Alpha Aquarii, Beta Aquarii and Delta Capricorni. Easily visible to naked eyes even in light polluted skies, the asterism is useful for orienting among three constellations.
- The Serpent Bowl is a large curved asterism spanning 3.5 hours of right ascension, from mid-northern latitudes best seen in July and August evenings. From west to east, it includes the stars Delta, Alpha and Epsilon Serpentis, Delta, Epsilon, Upsilon, Zeta and Eta Ophiuchi, Xi Serpentis, Nu and Tau Ophiuchi, Eta and Theta Serpentis.
- The Eagle Tail Corona is a flattened curved figure in the tail of Aquila and extending into Scutum. It consists of the stars 14, 15, Lambda and 12 Aquilae, Eta Scuti, HD 174208, R and Beta Scuti. The compact open cluster Messier 11 is also aligned with the curve.

== Telescopic asterisms ==
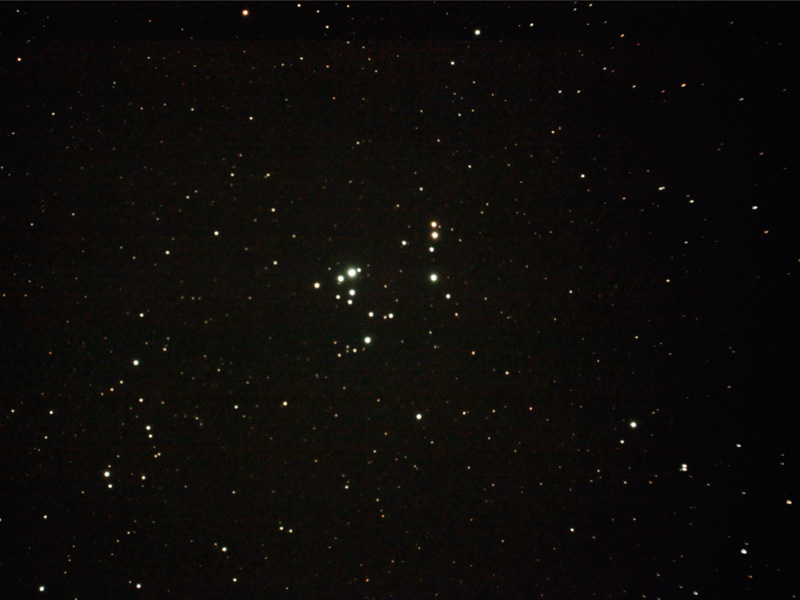
The "37" or "LE" of NGC 2169, in Orion. It is visible with binoculars.

Asterisms range from the large and obvious to the small, and even telescopic.

- The 37 or LE of NGC 2169, in Orion.
- The Engagement Ring in Ursa Minor has the north star Polaris as the diamond, at one end of a ring of much fainter stars about one degree across.
- The Broken Engagement Ring in Ursa Major at 10:51 / +56°10' (preceding β Ursae Majoris, Merak).
- The Christmas Tree shape of the Christmas Tree Cluster, in Monoceros. It is made up of about approximately 40 stars.
- The Coathanger, in Vulpecula, also known as Brocchi's Cluster (see image at top).
- Kemble's Cascade, a chain of stars that ends in open cluster NGC 1502, in Camelopardalis.
- Napoleon's Hat (Picot 1), in Bootes (south of α Bootis, Arcturus).
- The Ring of the Nibelungen (Ferrero 27) in Draco, named after the 1857 German epic drama, at 15:57 / +62°32' (near galaxy NGC 6015).
- The V-shaped Messier 73 in Aquarius, determined to be an asterism in 2002.
- Ally's Braid, a line of six stars leading away from Alcyone, brightest star of the Pleiades open cluster.

== See also ==
- Alignments of random points
- Australian Aboriginal astronomy
- Chinese constellations
- Former constellations
- Nakshatra

== Bibliography ==
- Allen, Richard Hinckley (1969). Star Names: Their Lore and Meaning. Dover Publications Inc. (Reprint of 1899 original). ISBN 0-486-21079-0.
- Burnham, Robert (1978). Burnham's Celestial Handbook (3 vols). Dover Publications Inc. ISBN 0-486-23567-X, 0-486-23568-8, 0-486-23673-0.
- Pasachoff, Jay M. (2000). A Field Guide to the Stars and Planets (4th ed.). Houghton Mifflin Co. ISBN 0-395-93431-1
