= Terebellum =

Terebellum derives from a Latin word meaning 'borer' or 'auger', and may refer to:

- Terebellum (gastropod), a genus of sea snails in family Seraphsidae

In astronomy, Terebellum (from the Greek word for a quadrilateral) can refer to:

- Terebellum (asterism), a group of stars in the constellation Sagittarius
- Terebellum (star), an alternative name for the star Omega Sagittarii
