= Thomas B. Hayward =

Chief of Naval Operations for the United States Navy

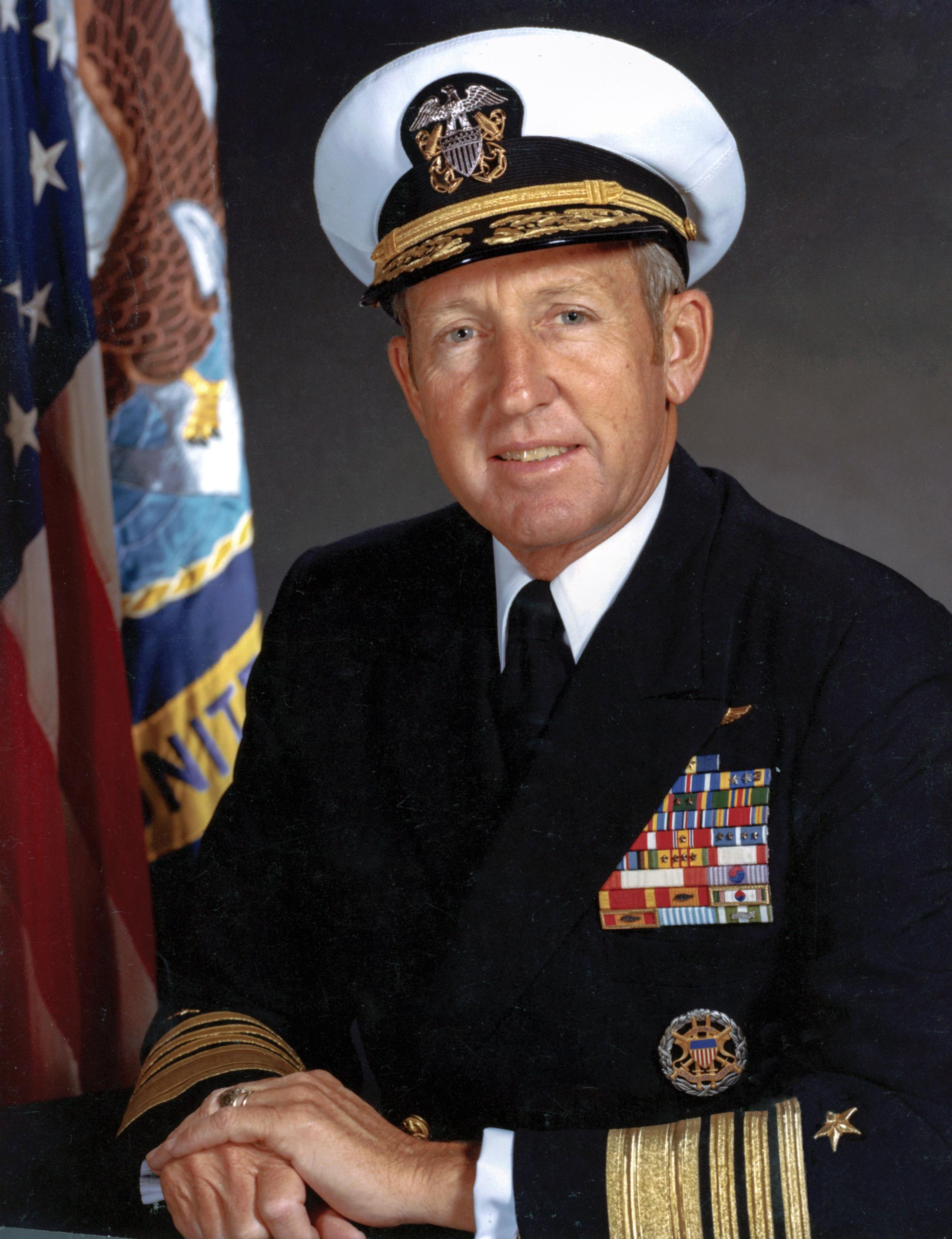
- Hayward, 21st Chief of Naval Operations
- Born: May 3, 1924; Glendale, California, U.S.
- Died: March 3, 2022 (aged 97); Seattle, Washington, U.S.
- Military career
- Branch: United States Navy
- Service years: 1942–1982
- Rank: Admiral
- Commands: Chief of Naval Operations; United States Pacific Fleet; United States Seventh Fleet; USS America (CVA-66); USS Graffias (AF-29); Carrier Air Wing Ten; VF-103
- Conflicts: World War II; Korean War; Vietnam War
- Awards: Defense Distinguished Service Medal (2); Navy Distinguished Service Medal (3); Coast Guard Distinguished Service Medal; Legion of Merit (3) with Combat V Distinguished Flying Cross

Admiral Thomas Bibb Hayward (May 3, 1924 – March 3, 2022) was Chief of Naval Operations for the United States Navy from July 1, 1978, until June 30, 1982, after which he retired from military service.

== Naval career ==
Shortly after the commencement of World War II, Hayward enlisted in the U.S. Navy V-5 aviation program and was called to active duty as a naval aviation cadet in 1943, anticipating that he would shortly be flying combat in the South Pacific. However, when roughly halfway through the flight training syllabus, he competed for and was accepted to attend the United States Naval Academy at Annapolis, Maryland, to position himself for a career in the U.S. Navy at war's end. He graduated from the Academy in July 1947, and was assigned to the USS Antietam (CV-36) as an engineering officer. In 1949, he returned to flight training at Naval Air Station Pensacola, Florida, and received his United States Naval Aviator wings in July 1950. The Korean War having begun, as a lieutenant junior grade, he reported to VF-51 and flew from the decks of the aircraft carriers USS Essex (CV-9) and USS Valley Forge (CV-45), flying 146 combat missions, and was awarded the Distinguished Flying Cross, seven Air Medals, and two Navy Commendation Medals with Combat "V" for Valor. One of Hayward's squadron mates in VF-51 was future astronaut Neil Armstrong, who became his lifelong friend.

Following his Korean tour, Hayward became a Navy test pilot, a lead instructor in the forerunner to the Navy Fighter Weapons School, also known as TOPGUN, and Commanding Officer of VF-103. He also attended the Naval War College in 1958. In 1959 he was one of the 32 finalists for NASA Astronaut Group 1, but ultimately was not selected.

In 1965–66, as Commander Carrier Air Wing Ten (CW-10), Hayward flew 36 combat missions in Vietnam, flying from the deck of USS Intrepid (CV-11), receiving the Legion of Merit and three Air Medals. In 1967, he attended the National War College and obtained a master's degree in Foreign Affairs from George Washington University. As a captain, Hayward returned to Vietnam as Commanding Officer of the USS Graffias (AF-29) and later as Commanding Officer of the USS America (CVA-66), for which he was awarded the Legion of Merit.

Hayward then had tours of duty as commander of the United States Seventh Fleet from 1975 to 1976, and then Commander in Chief of the United States Pacific Fleet from August 12, 1976, to May 9, 1978.

As Chief of Naval Operations, Hayward is best remembered for his "Pride in the Navy" priority: the emphasis on rebuilding readiness of both active and reserve forces; restoring priority in mine warfare; and his success in the zero tolerance "Not in my Navy" drug program.

In 1981, he was awarded the Society of Experimental Test Pilots James H. Doolittle Award. In January 2007, the United States Naval Academy Alumni Association announced Admiral Thomas B. Hayward as one of four recipients of its 2007 Distinguished Graduate Award.

== Corporate career and retirement ==
After retirement from the Navy, his primary efforts were in the field of education, where he helped co-found companies focused on reading and math solutions K-12, masters and doctorates in education, and both domestic and international distance learning for college and higher ed. He also served on the board of advisors of the Code of Support Foundation, a nonprofit military services organization.

== Death ==
Hayward died on March 3, 2022, at the age of 97 in Seattle, Washington.

== Awards and decorations ==

Naval Aviator Badge
Defense Distinguished Service Medal with 1 bronze oak leaf cluster		Navy Distinguished Service Medal with 1 gold award star
Coast Guard Distinguished Service Medal	Legion of Merit with Combat V and 2 award stars	Distinguished Flying Cross
Air Medal with one silver, one bronze award stars and bronze Strike/Flight numeral 3	Navy and Marine Corps Commendation Medal with Combat V and award star	Navy Unit Commendation with two bronze service stars
Navy Meritorious Unit Commendation	China Service Medal	American Campaign Medal
World War II Victory Medal	Navy Occupation Service Medal	National Defense Service Medal with 1 service star
Korean Service Medal with 4 service stars	Armed Forces Expeditionary Medal	Vietnam Service Medal with 8 service stars
Order of the Rising Sun, degree unknown (Japan)	Order of the Cloud and Banner with Grand Cordon, 2nd Grade (Republic of China)	Order of National Security Merit Gukseon Medal, 2nd Class (Republic of Korea)
National Order of Vietnam, Knight	Vietnam Gallantry Cross with palm	Korean Presidential Unit Citation
Vietnam Gallantry Cross Unit Citation	United Nations Korea Medal	Vietnam Campaign Medal
Joint Chiefs of Staff Identification Badge

Military offices
Preceded by James L. Holloway III	Chief of Naval Operations; 1978–1982	Succeeded by James D. Watkins
