= Kappa Piscium =

Variable star in the constellation Pisces

- Location of κ Piscium (circled)

Observation data Epoch J2000.0 Equinox J2000.0 (ICRS)
- Constellation: Pisces
- Right ascension: 23^{h} 26^{m} 55.95586^{s}
- Declination: +01° 15′ 20.1900″
- Apparent magnitude (V): 4.94

Characteristics
- Evolutionary stage: Main sequence
- Spectral type: A2 Vp SrCrSi
- U−B color index: −0.03
- B−V color index: +0.04
- Variable type: α^{2} CVn

Astrometry
Proper motion (μ)	RA: +86.68 mas/yr Dec.: −94.29 mas/yr
Parallax (π)	21.25±0.29 mas
Distance	153 ± 2 ly (47.1 ± 0.6 pc)
Absolute magnitude (M_{V})	+1.59

Details
Mass	2.62 M_{☉}
Radius	1.71 R_{☉}
Luminosity	30 L_{☉}
Surface gravity (log g)	4.2 cgs
Temperature	9,470 K
Metallicity [Fe/H]	+0.74 dex
Rotational velocity (v sin i)	38.4±1.5 km/s
Age	157 Myr

Other designations
- κ Psc, 8 Piscium, BD+00°4998, FK5 884, HD 220825, HIP 115738, HR 8911, SAO 128186, WDS J23269+0115A

Database references
SIMBAD	data

Kappa Piscium (κ Piscium) is a solitary, white-hued star in the zodiac constellation of Pisces. It is visible to the naked eye with an apparent visual magnitude of 4.94, forming the southeastern corner of the "Circlet" asterism in Pisces. Based upon a measured annual parallax shift of 21.25 mas as seen from Earth, it is located about 153 light years distant from the Sun. Appearing as a single point in the sky, it is easily split when viewed with a pair of binoculars, and displays three components. Kappa Piscium has an apparent magnitude of 4.87 at maximum brightness and 4.95 at minimum brightness, while the visual companions have apparent magnitudes of 9.96 and 11.20.

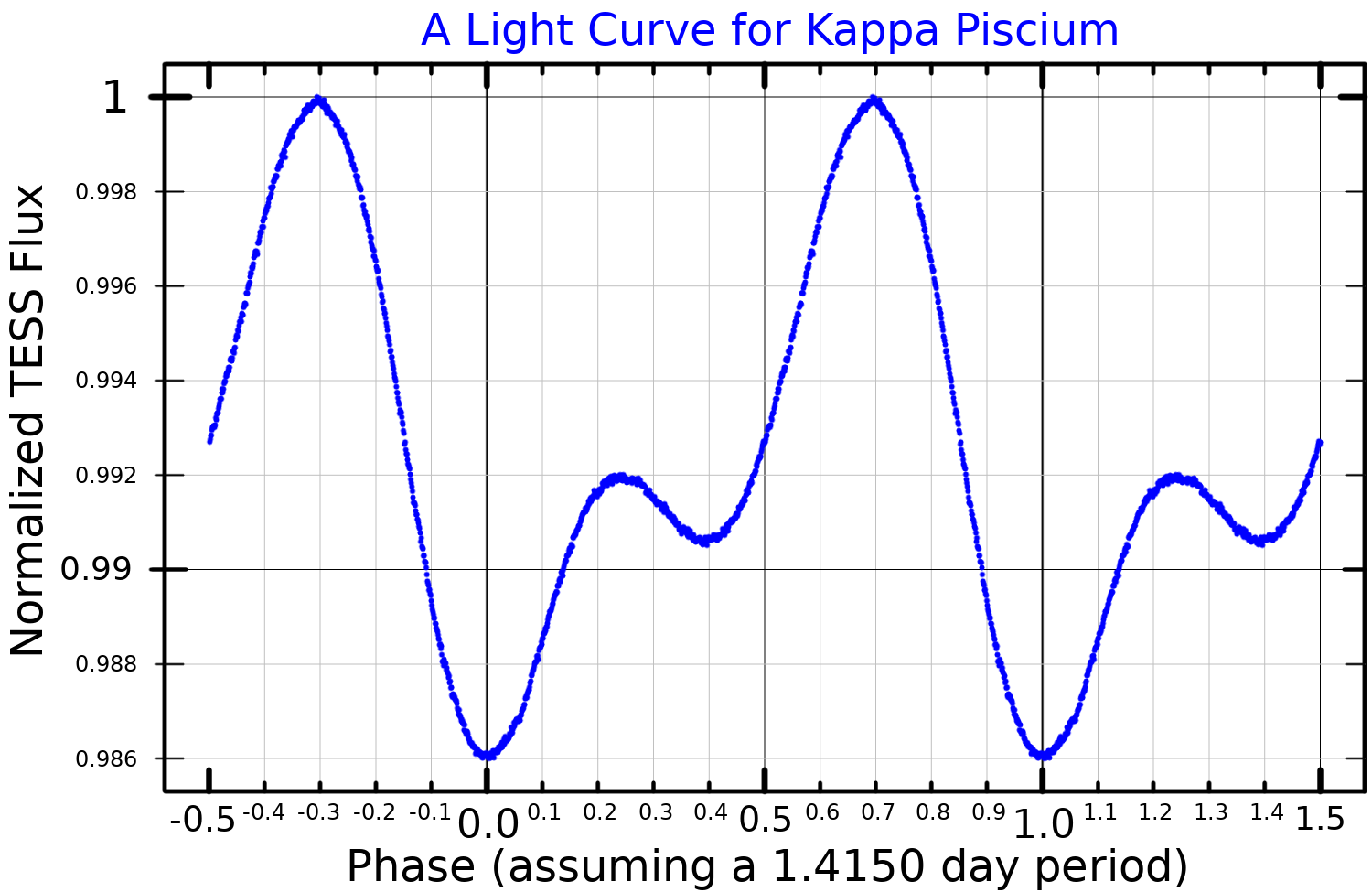
A light curve for Kappa Piscium, plotted from TESS data

This is an A-type main-sequence star with a stellar classification of A2 Vp SrCrSi. The suffix designation indicates it is a "chemically peculiar" Ap star that displays abnormal abundances of silicon, strontium, and chromium. It is an Alpha^{2} Canum Venaticorum variable with a weak active magnetic field that causes it to fluctuate by 0.01 to 0.1 in magnitude as it rotates. It shows many lines of uranium, and possibly the rare element holmium in its spectrum. Its uranium and osmium content could have been provided by a nearby supernova. Compared to the Sun, it is deficient in oxygen relative to the magnesium abundance.

This star is a candidate member of the AB Doradus moving group, an association of stars with similar ages that share a common heading through space.

== Naming ==
In Chinese, 雲雨 (Yún Yǔ), meaning Cloud and Rain, refers to an asterism consisting of κ Piscium, 12 Piscium, 21 Piscium and λ Piscium. Consequently, the Chinese name for κ Piscium itself is 雲雨一 (Yún Yǔ yī, English: the First Star of Cloud and Rain.)
