= USS Graffias =

U.S. Navy war ship commissioned in 1944

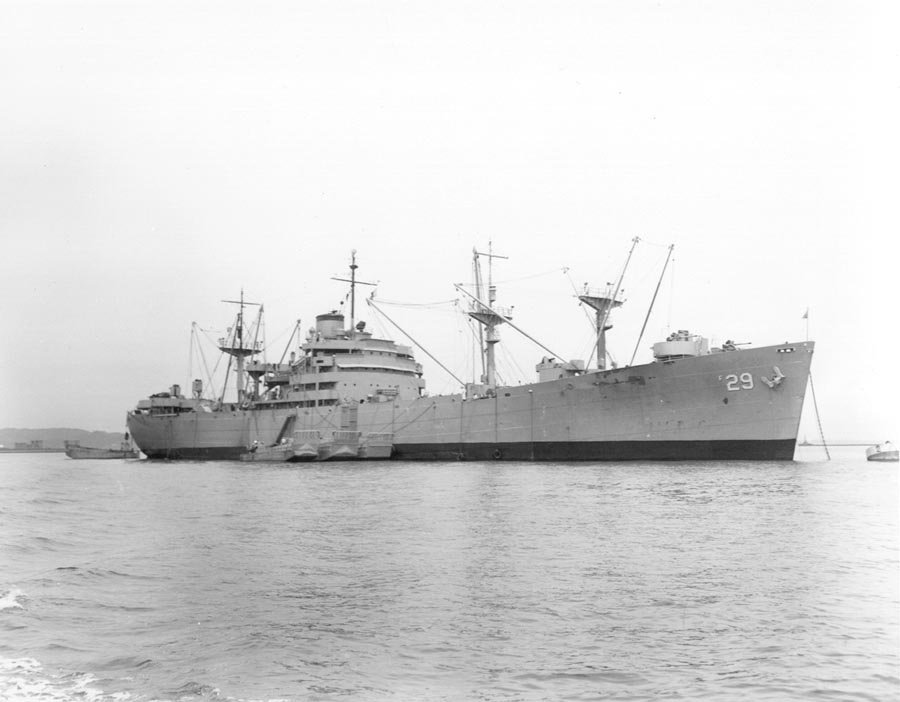
- USS Graffias (AF-29)

History

United States
- Name: USS Graffias
- Builder: Gulf Shipbuilding Corporation
- Laid down: 1943, as SS Topa Topa
- Launched: 12 December 1943
- Acquired: by purchase, 19 February 1944
- Commissioned: 28 October 1944
- Honours and awards: 8 battle stars (Korea); 7 campaign stars (Vietnam)
- Fate: Scrapped in 1973

General characteristics
- Type: Store ship
- Displacement: 7,700 long tons (7,824 t) light; 14,900 long tons (15,139 t) full load
- Length: 468 ft 11 in (142.93 m)
- Beam: 63 ft (19 m)
- Draft: 25 ft 11 in (7.90 m)
- Propulsion: Geared turbines, 1 shaft, 6,000 shp (4,474 kW)
- Speed: 16 knots (30 km/h; 18 mph)
- Complement: 319 officers and enlisted
- Armament: 1 × 5"/38 caliber guns; 4 × single 3"/50 caliber guns; 12 × single 20 mm guns

USS Graffias (AF-29), a Hyades-class stores ship, is the only ship of the United States Navy to have this name. The name Graffias is another name for the star Beta Scorpii in the constellation Scorpius.

The Graffias was originally laid down in 1943 as Topa Topa, a Maritime Commission type (C2-S-E1) hull under Maritime Commission contract (MC hull 1610) at the Gulf Shipbuilding Corporation, Chickasaw, Alabama. The ship was acquired by the United States Navy on 19 February 1944 and subsequently converted by the Bethlehem Steel Company, Baltimore, Maryland. The Graffias was commissioned at Baltimore on 28 October 1944.

== Initial operations ==
After a brief shakedown along the East Coast, Graffias sailed for the Pacific on 25 November as a unit of ServRon Ten. Reaching Ulithi on 31 December, she discharged her valuable cargo of provisions and returned to San Francisco, California, a month later. Laden with foodstuffs and provisions for the staging areas and the front, Graffias made two more San Francisco-Ulithi voyages through May 1945.

The refrigerator-cargo ship returned to Pearl Harbor on 31 May and from there sailed again to Ulithi with provisions, returning to Hawaii on 14 July. After repairs at Pearl Harbor, Graffias sailed to Adak, Alaska, reaching port on 18 August. With the Japanese capitulation, she began a new task: bringing desperately needed provisions to the starving island and to American occupation forces. Graffias reached Ominato, Honshū, on 9 September, and after replenishing American bases at Wakayama, Nagasaki, and Sasebo, sailed for the United States with home and discharge-bound passengers. Putting in at Seattle on 26 October, she disembarked her passengers and checked into Bremerton Navy Yard for overhaul.

By January 1946, Graffias was well embarked on the routine which she was to follow until the Korean War, replenishing scattered American bases across the Pacific. Taking on cargo at Seattle or San Francisco, she would discharge provisions at such far-flung points as Wake Island, Eniwetok, Kwajalein, Bikini, Okinawa, the Philippines, Guam, Saipan, Formosa, Shanghai, Hong Kong, and Yokosuka. These Pacific replenishment cruises, whose duration was 2½ months on the average, were supplemented by periodic overhauls and participation in various fleet exercises.

== Korean War ==
When war broke out in Korea in June 1950, Graffias sailed to Sasebo, Japan, her new home port, to begin the vital task of provisioning United States and United Nations ships and troops. For three years she shuttled between Sasebo and various at sea replenishment areas to effect cargo transfer, as well as making frequent stops along the Korean coast.

As the conflict ended with an armistice in August 1953, Graffias remained on duty with the 7th Fleet to continue her task of replenishing ships and troops. Replenishment cruises took her across the ocean to Hong Kong and Formosa as well as Okinawa and the Philippines. During the intensification of the Quemoy-Matsu situation in the summer of 1955, and thereafter, Graffias made frequent stops at Formosa to provision American and Chinese Nationalist forces as well as an enlarged 7th Fleet.

In the decade that followed, Graffias operated almost continuously out of Sasebo supplying American naval ships in Far Eastern ports especially, in the Philippines, Formosa, Hong Kong and Vietnam. She departed Sasebo on 26 February 1964 for her new home port of San Francisco.

== Vietnam War ==
Following a thorough overhaul, she headed westward again on 27 June and reached Yokosuka on 13 July. On the last day of July, she sailed for Subic Bay after the Gulf of Tonkin incident.

Following the Gulf of Tonkin on 4 August, Graffias was ordered to the area to provide logistic support. A week later, she replenished the two destroyers and subsequently supplied many other ships of the 7th Fleet. After setting a replenishment record during the deployment by transferring supplies at an average rate of 168.9 short tons per hour, Graffias steamed home via Hong Kong, Yokosuka, and Pearl Harbor, arriving in San Francisco on 12 October.

Following two deployments to the Far East in 1965, supporting the Allied forces in Vietnam, Graffias operated along the Pacific Coast in 1966 until sailing for the western Pacific on 10 December. On the last day of 1966 she departed Yokosuka to resume underway replenishment operations supplying ships of the 7th Fleet fighting off Vietnam in 1967. Graffias returned to her homeport in April 1967 after a port call in Hawaii where one of her boilers was repaired. She sailed again in August 1967 to the western Pacific and the waters off the coast of Vietnam, under the command of Captain Thomas B. Hayward. Captain Hayward departed Graffias in June 1968 for duty in Washington, D.C.. The ship returned to its home port for Christmas on 23 December 1967, the ship's first Christmas in the United States since 1949. Graffias again set sail in late July 1968 to support the war effort off the coast of Vietnam, returning to San Francisco in November 1968. Graffias was decommissioned in 1969.

Graffias earned eight battle stars for Korean War service and seven campaign stars for Vietnam War service.
