= NGC 2169 =

Open cluster in the constellation Orion

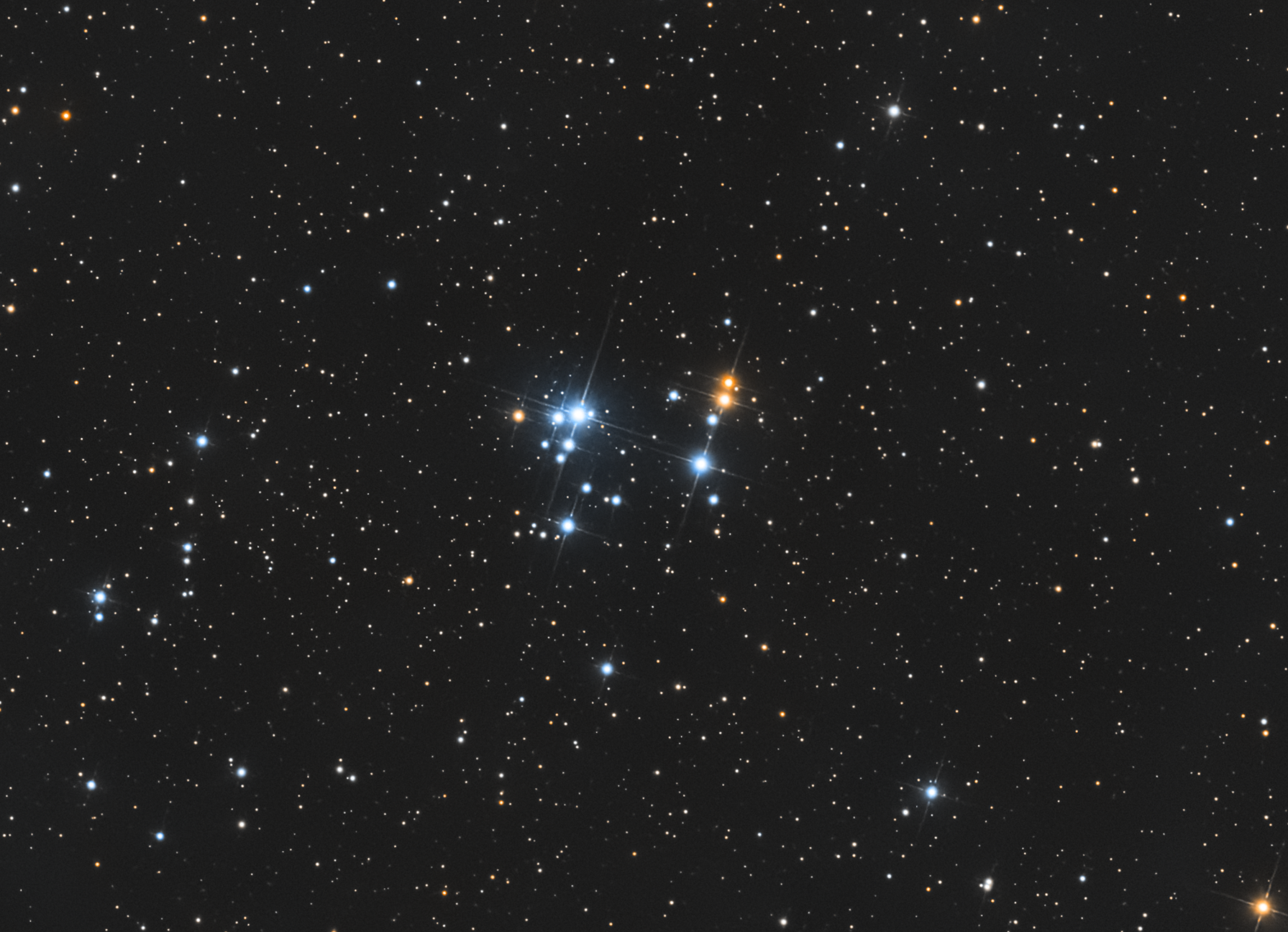
- Image showing the 37 asterism.

Observation data (J2000 epoch)
- Right ascension: 06^{h} 8.4^{m}
- Declination: +13° 57′
- Distance: 3.6 kly
- Apparent magnitude (V): 5.9
- Apparent dimensions (V): 6′

Physical characteristics
- Other designations: 37 Cluster, Cr 38/83

Associations
- Constellation: Orion

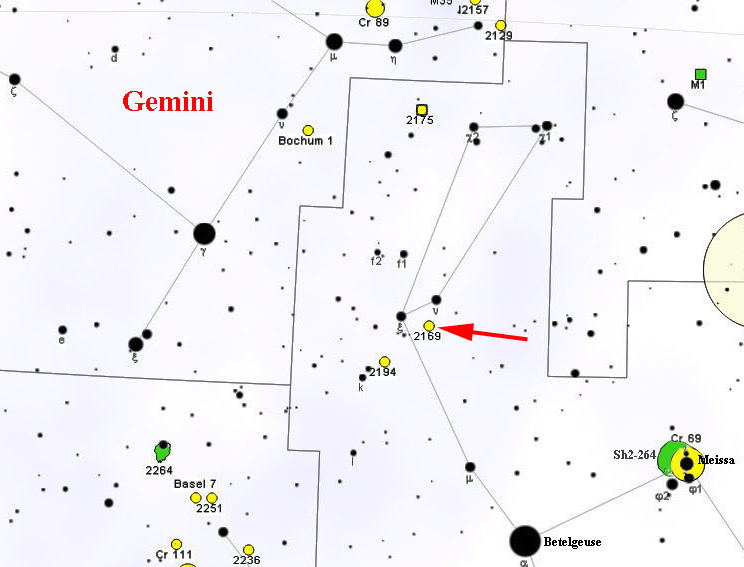
NGC 2169 location map

NGC 2169, also known as the Shopping Cart Cluster or Little Pleiades, is an open cluster of stars in the Constellation of Orion. It was possibly discovered by Giovanni Batista Hodierna before 1654 and independently discovered by William Herschel on October 15, 1784. NGC 2169 is at a distance of about 3,600 light years away from Earth. It is nicknamed "The '37' Cluster" due to its striking resemblance to the numerals "37". The cluster is composed of components Collinder 38, a I3pn open cluster, and Collinder 83, a III3m open cluster.
