= Rho Scorpii =

Multiple stellar system in the constellation Scorpius

ρ Scorpii
- Location of ρ Scorpii (circled)

Observation data Epoch J2000 Equinox J2000
- Constellation: Scorpius
- Right ascension: 15^{h} 56^{m} 53.07624^{s}
- Declination: −29° 12′ 50.6612″
- Apparent magnitude (V): 3.86

Characteristics
- Spectral type: B2 IV
- U−B color index: -0.82
- B−V color index: -0.20

Astrometry
Radial velocity (R_{v})	−0.40 km/s
Proper motion (μ)	RA: −15.68 mas/yr Dec.: −24.88 mas/yr
Parallax (π)	6.91±0.19 mas
Distance	470 ± 10 ly (145 ± 4 pc)
Absolute magnitude (M_{V})	−1.93

Orbit
Period (P)	4.0033 d
Eccentricity (e)	0.27
Periastron epoch (T)	2442178.6060 JD
Argument of periastron (ω) (secondary)	231°
Semi-amplitude (K_{1}) (primary)	16.40 km/s

Details
Mass	7.94±0.55 M_{☉}
Radius	4.36 (Note: Calculated, using the Stefan-Boltzmann law and the star's effective temperature and luminosity, with respect to the solar nominal effective temperature of 5,772 K: $$\sqrt{\biggl(\frac{5,772}{21,150}\biggr)^4 \cdot 3,432} = 4.36\ R_\odot.$$) R_{☉}
Luminosity (bolometric)	3,432 L_{☉}
Temperature	21,150 K
Rotational velocity (v sin i)	113 km/s
Age	13.7 Myr

Other designations
- Iklil, 5 Scorpii, ADS 9846, CCDM J15569-2913A, FK5 3258, GC 21398, HD 142669, HIP 78104, HR 5928, SAO 183957, CD−28°11714

Database references
SIMBAD	data

Rho Scorpii (ρ Scorpii, abbreviated Rho Sco, ρ Sco) is a double star in the constellation of Scorpius. It has an apparent visual magnitude of +3.87, which is bright enough to be seen with the naked eye. Based upon parallax measurements, it is located approximately 472 light years from the Sun. At that distance, the visual magnitude of the system is reduced by 0.07 due to extinction from interstellar dust. It is a member of the Upper Scorpius OB association.

It has two components, designated Rho Scorpii A and B. Rho Scorpii A is itself a single-lined spectroscopic binary whose components are designated Rho Scorpii Aa (formally named Iklil /ˈɪklɪl/, traditionally the name for several neighboring stars) and Ab.

== Nomenclature ==
ρ Scorpii (Latinised to Rho Scorpii) is the system's Bayer designation. The designations of the three constituents as Rho Scorpii A and B, and those of A's components - Rho Scorpii Aa and Ab - derive from the convention used by the Washington Multiplicity Catalog (WMC) for multiple star systems, and adopted by the International Astronomical Union (IAU).

Rho Scorpii was likely part of the Arabic lunar mansion of Iklil (الإكليل al-ʼiklīl) "the crown (of the forehead)"), along with Beta, Delta, Pi and possibly Nu Scorpii.

The corresponding asterism in Chinese astronomy, 房宿 (Fáng Xiù), meaning Room, consists of Rho Scorpii, Pi Scorpii, Delta Scorpii, Beta¹ Scorpii and Beta² Scorpii. Consequently, the Chinese name for ρ Scorpii itself is 房宿二 (Fáng Xiù èr), "the Second Star of Room".

In 2016, the IAU organized a Working Group on Star Names (WGSN) to catalog and standardize proper names for stars. The WGSN decided to attribute proper names to individual stars rather than entire multiple systems. It approved the name Iklil for the component Rho Scorpii Aa on 5 September 2017 and it is now so included in the List of IAU-approved Star Names.

== Properties ==
Rho Scorpii A displays the spectrum of blue-white B-type subgiant with a stellar classification of B2 IV. It has an estimated mass nearly 8 times that of the Sun's and shines with 3,432 times the Sun's luminosity. The two constituent stars orbit each other with a period of 4 days and an eccentricity of 0.27.

Rho Scorpii B is a magnitude 12.80 visual companion that lies at an angular separation of 38.40 arcseconds along a position angle of 95°, as of the year 2000.
