= Lambda Piscium =

Star in the constellation Pisces

- Location of λ Piscium (circled)

Observation data Epoch J2000.0 Equinox J2000.0 (ICRS)
- Constellation: Pisces
- Right ascension: 23^{h} 42^{m} 02.80612^{s}
- Declination: +01° 46′ 48.1484″
- Apparent magnitude (V): 4.49

Characteristics
- Evolutionary stage: main sequence
- Spectral type: A7 V
- U−B color index: +0.09
- B−V color index: +0.20

Astrometry
Radial velocity (R_{v})	6.7 km/s
Proper motion (μ)	RA: −129.70 mas/yr Dec.: −154.80 mas/yr
Parallax (π)	30.59±0.19 mas
Distance	106.6 ± 0.7 ly (32.7 ± 0.2 pc)
Absolute magnitude (M_{V})	+1.92

Details
Mass	1.806 M_{☉}
Radius	2.0403±0.0451 R_{☉}
Luminosity	13.3897±0.1692 L_{☉}
Surface gravity (log g)	4.08 cgs
Temperature	7,734±80 K
Metallicity [Fe/H]	0.02 dex
Rotational velocity (v sin i)	70 km/s

Other designations
- λ Psc, 18 Piscium, BD+00°5037, FK5 1620, HD 222603, HIP 116928, HR 8984, SAO 128336

Database references
SIMBAD	data

Lambda Piscium, Latinized from λ Piscium, is a solitary, white-hued star in the zodiac constellation of Pisces. With an apparent visual magnitude of 4.49, it is visible to the naked eye, forming the southeast corner of the "Circlet" asterism in Pisces. Based upon a measured annual parallax shift of 30.59 mas as seen from Earth, it is located 107 light years distant from the Sun. Lambda Piscium is a member of the Ursa Major Stream, lying among the outer parts, or corona, of this moving group of stars that roughly follow a common heading through space.

This well-studied star has a stellar classification A7 V, indicating it is an A-type main-sequence star that is generating energy through hydrogen fusion at its core. It has 1.8 times the mass of the Sun and double the Sun's radius. The star is radiating 13.3 times the Sun's luminosity from its photosphere at an effective temperature of 7,734 K. Lambda Piscium is spinning with a projected rotational velocity of 70 km/s.

== Naming ==
In Chinese, 雲雨 (Yún Yǔ), meaning Cloud and Rain, refers to an asterism consisting of λ Piscium, κ Piscium, 12 Piscium and 21 Piscium. Consequently, the Chinese name for λ Piscium itself is 雲雨四 (Yún Yǔ sì, English: the Fourth Star of Cloud and Rain.)
