= Omega Sagittarii =

Binary star system in the constellation of Sagittarius

- Location of ω Sagittarii (circled)

Observation data Epoch J2000.0 Equinox J2000.0 (ICRS)
- Constellation: Sagittarius
- Right ascension: 19^{h} 55^{m} 50.36255^{s}
- Declination: −26° 17′ 57.6933″
- Apparent magnitude (V): 4.70

Characteristics
- Evolutionary stage: subgiant
- Spectral type: G5 IV
- U−B color index: +0.32
- B−V color index: +0.748±0.015
- R−I color index: +0.37

Astrometry
Radial velocity (R_{v})	−16.22±0.43 km/s
Proper motion (μ)	RA: 203.96 mas/yr Dec.: 74.40 mas/yr
Parallax (π)	42.7159±0.5538 mas
Distance	76.4 ± 1.0 ly (23.4 ± 0.3 pc)
Absolute magnitude (M_{V})	2.64

Orbit
Period (P)	1,712.74±0.29 d
Semi-major axis (a)	≥ 1.1044 ± 0.0051 AU
Eccentricity (e)	0.8200±0.0012
Periastron epoch (T)	57549.31±0.20 HJD
Argument of periastron (ω) (secondary)	141.17±0.33°
Semi-amplitude (K_{1}) (primary)	12.255±0.041 km/s

Details
Mass	1.52+0.08 −0.06 M_{☉}
Radius	2.87+0.37 −0.34 R_{☉}
Luminosity	7.1±0.1 L_{☉}
Surface gravity (log g)	3.64±0.05 cgs
Temperature	5,499±91 K
Metallicity [Fe/H]	0.06±0.06 dex
Rotational velocity (v sin i)	5.6 km/s
Age	3.00+0.13 −0.61 Gyr

Other designations
- Terebellum, ψ Sgr, 58 Sagittarii, CPD−26°6880, FK5 1629, GC 27583, GJ 770.1, GJ 9673, HD 188376, HIP 98066, HR 7597, SAO 188722, PPM 270451

Database references
SIMBAD	data

Omega Sagittarii, which is Latinized from ω Sagittarii, is a binary star system in the constellation of Sagittarius, near the eastern constellation border with Capricornus. It is formally named Terebellum /tɛrɪˈbɛləm/. This system has a yellow hue and is faintly visible to the naked eye with an apparent visual magnitude of 4.70. It is located at a distance of 76 light years away from the Sun based on parallax, and is drifting closer with a radial velocity of −16 km/s. The position of this star near the ecliptic means it is subject to lunar occultations.

The members of this system orbit each other with a period of 4.6892 yr and an eccentricity of 0.82. The visible component is a G-type subgiant star with a stellar classification of G5 IV. It is three billion years old and is spinning with a projected rotational velocity of 5.6 km/s. The star is radiating seven times the luminosity of the Sun from its photosphere at an effective temperature of 5,499 K.

== Nomenclature ==
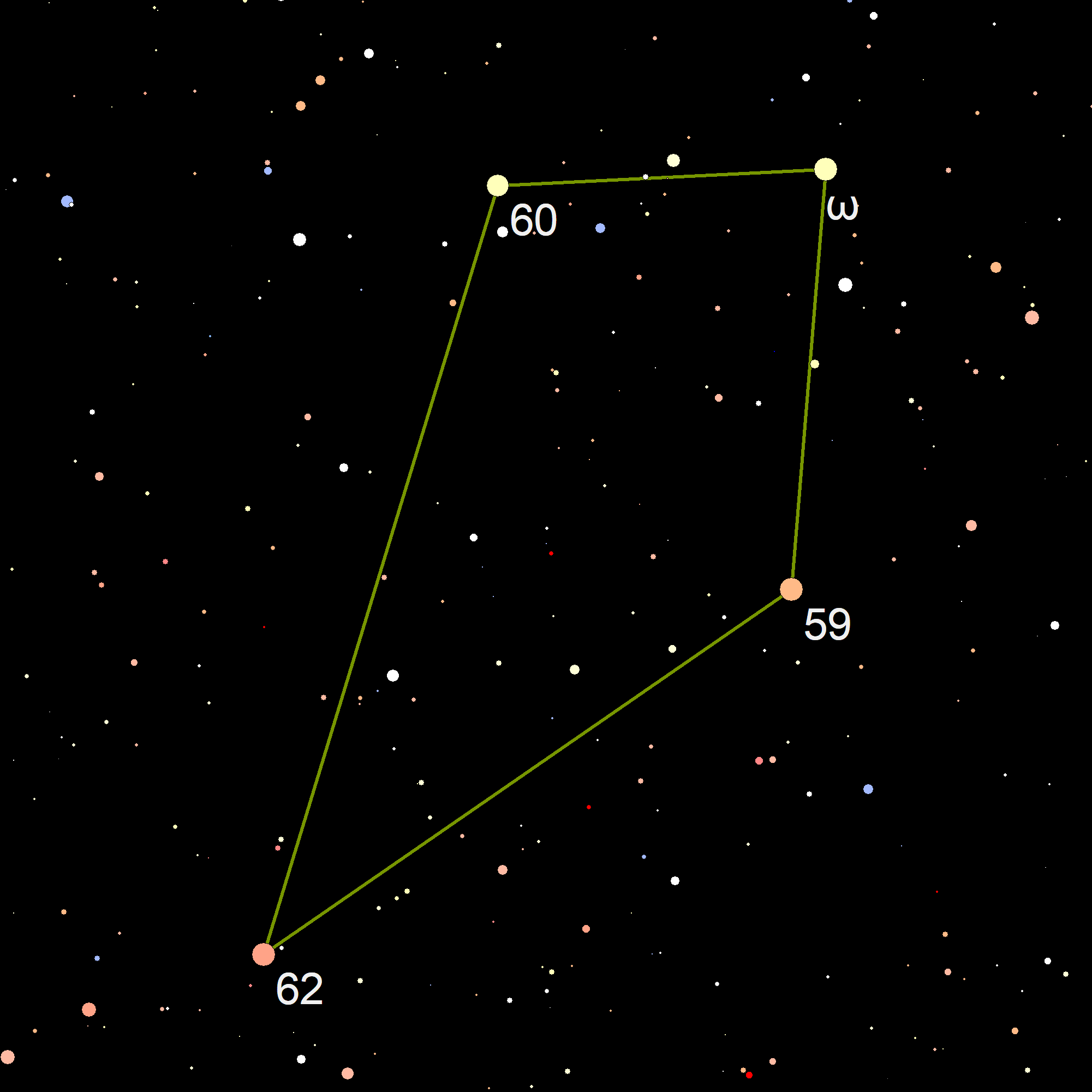
The four stars of the Terebellum

ω Sagittarii (Latinised to Omega Sagittarii) is the star's Bayer designation.

This star, together with 60, 62 and 59 Sagittarii, formed the asterism called "Terebellum". According to a 1971 NASA memorandum, Terebellum was originally the title for four stars: Omega Sagittarii as Terebellum I, 59 Sagittarii as Terebellum II, 60 Sagittarii as Terebellum III and 62 Sagittarii as Terebellum IV . In 2016, the IAU organized a Working Group on Star Names (WGSN) to catalog and standardize proper names for stars. The WGSN approved the name Terebellum for Omega Sagittarii on 5 September 2017 and it is now so included in the List of IAU-approved Star Names.

In Chinese, 狗國 (Gǒu Guó), meaning Dog Territory, refers to an asterism consisting of Omega Sagittarii, 60 Sagittarii, 62 Sagittarii and 59 Sagittarii. Consequently, the Chinese name for Omega Sagittarii itself is 狗國一 (Gǒu Guó yī, English: the First Star of Dog Territory.)
