= 59 Sagittarii =

Star in the constellation Sagittarius

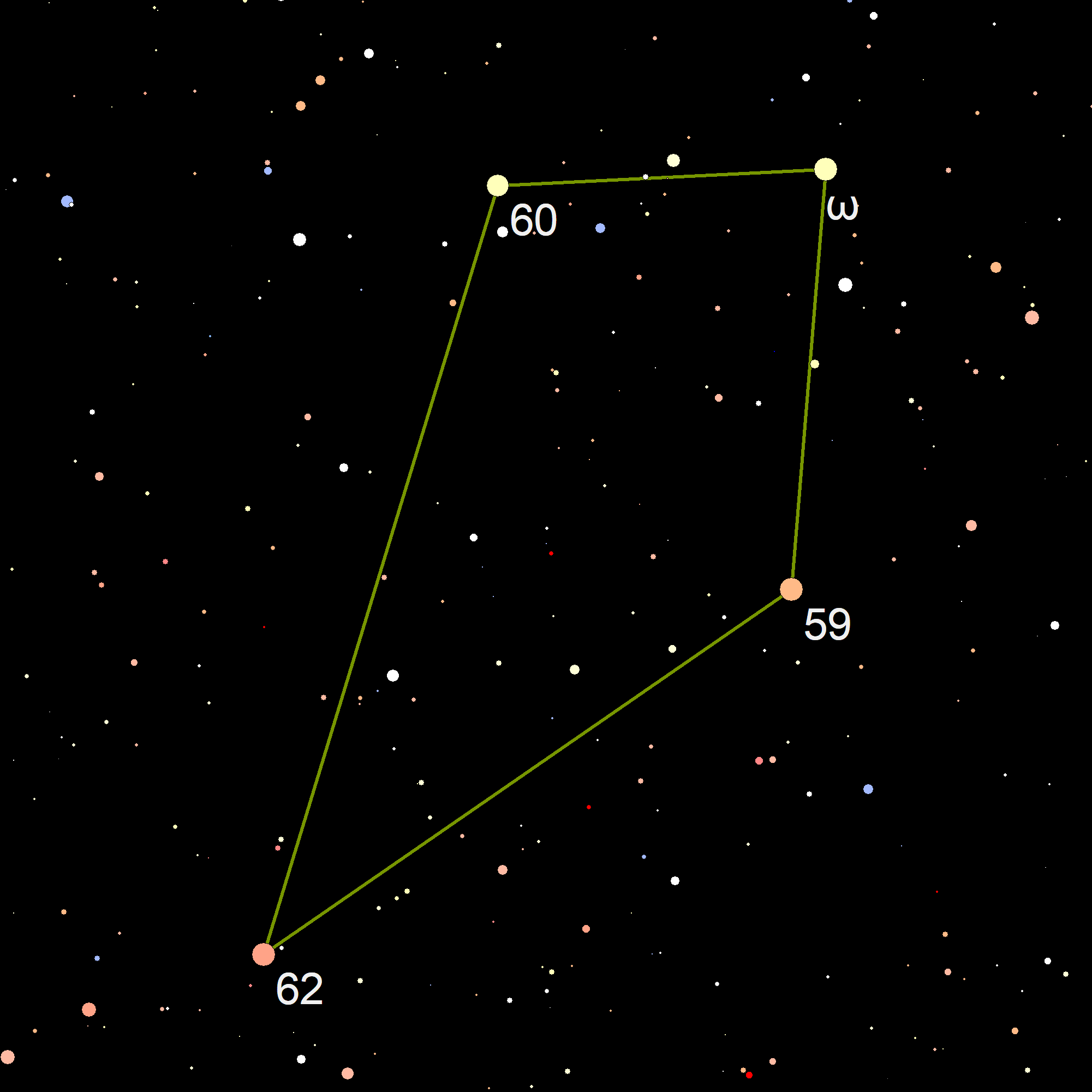
- The four stars of the Terebellum

Observation data Epoch J2000.0 Equinox J2000.0 (ICRS)
- Constellation: Sagittarius
- Right ascension: 19^{h} 56^{m} 56.83165^{s}
- Declination: −27° 10′ 11.6409″
- Apparent magnitude (V): 4.54

Characteristics
- Spectral type: K2.5IIb
- U−B color index: +1.462±0.048
- B−V color index: +1.46
- R−I color index: +0.73

Astrometry
Radial velocity (R_{v})	−16.4±0.9 km/s
Proper motion (μ)	RA: +10.46 mas/yr Dec.: −15.52 mas/yr
Parallax (π)	3.92±0.28 mas
Distance	830 ± 60 ly (260 ± 20 pc)
Absolute magnitude (M_{V})	−2.48

Details
Mass	6.2±0.1 M_{☉}
Radius	100.19+4.73 −6.60 R_{☉}
Luminosity	2,825±287 L_{☉}
Surface gravity (log g)	1.78 cgs
Temperature	4,204+146 −96 K
Metallicity [Fe/H]	−0.10±0.06 dex
Age	64.2±17.7 Myr

Other designations
- b Sgr, 59 Sgr, CD−27°14399, CPD−27°6892, GC 27605, HD 188603, HIP 98162, HR 7604, SAO 188742, PPM 270473

Database references
SIMBAD	data

59 Sagittarii is a single star in the southern constellation of Sagittarius, about a degree to the south of Omega Sagittarii near the constellation border with Capricornus. It has the Bayer designation b Sagittarii, or sometimes b^{1} Sagittarii, while 59 Sagittarii is the Flamsteed designation. The star is visible to the naked eye as a faint, orange-hued star with an apparent visual magnitude of 4.544. It forms the southeast corner of the asterism called the Terebellum. Based upon parallax measurements, the star is located approximately 830 light years away from the Sun. It is moving closer to the Earth with a heliocentric radial velocity of −16 km/s.

This is an aging bright giant star with a stellar classification of K2.5IIb, having exhausted the supply of hydrogen at its core and expanded to 100 times the radius of the Sun. It is 64 million years old with 6.2 times the Sun's mass. The star is radiating 2,825 times the luminosity of the Sun from its swollen photosphere at an effective temperature of 4,204 K.
