= Delta Scorpii =

Binary star system in the constellation Scorpius

δ Scorpii
- Location of δ Scorpii (circled)

Observation data Epoch J2000 Equinox ICRS
- Constellation: Scorpius
- Right ascension: 16^{h} 00^{m} 20.00528^{s}
- Declination: −22° 37′ 18.1431″
- Apparent magnitude (V): 1.59 - 2.32

Characteristics
- Evolutionary stage: main sequence
- Spectral type: B0.3 IV + B1-3V
- U−B color index: −0.920
- B−V color index: −0.124
- Variable type: γ Cas

Astrometry
Radial velocity (R_{v})	−7.7±0.8 km/s
Proper motion (μ)	RA: −10.21 mas/yr Dec.: −35.41 mas/yr
Parallax (π)	7.4±0.2 mas
Distance	440±13 ly (135±4 pc)
Absolute magnitude (M_{V})	−3.8

Orbit
Period (P)	10.8092±0.0005 yr
Semi-major axis (a)	0.09894±0.00014" (13.5±0.1 AU)
Eccentricity (e)	0.936±0.004
Inclination (i)	36±1°
Longitude of the node (Ω)	175.0±2.1°
Periastron epoch (T)	2011 July 3rd
Argument of periastron (ω) (secondary)	−2.6±3.0°
Semi-amplitude (K_{1}) (primary)	23.4±0.5 km/s

Details

δ Sco A
Mass	15.3±0.2 M_{☉}
Radius	6.8±0.2 (equatorial); 6.4±0.2 (polar) R_{☉}
Luminosity	28,000±1,000 L_{☉}
Surface gravity (log g)	4.01±0.02 cgs
Temperature	29,700±200 K
Rotational velocity (v sin i)	180 km/s
Age	7.3±0.4 Myr

δ Sco B
Mass	8.2±0.6 M_{☉}
Radius	5.33 R_{☉}
Temperature	20-24,000 K
Age	9-10 Myr

Other designations
- Dschubba, Dzuba, Al Jabba, Iclarkrau, 7 Scorpii, BD−22°4068, HD 143275, HIP 78401, HR 5953, FK5 594, SAO 184014, CCDM 16003-2237

Database references
SIMBAD	data

Delta Scorpii (Latinised from δ Scorpii, abbreviated Delta Sco, δ Sco) is a binary star (the presence of a third star in the system is suspected) in the constellation of Scorpius. The primary star is named Dschubba /ˈdʒʌbə/.

== Observation ==
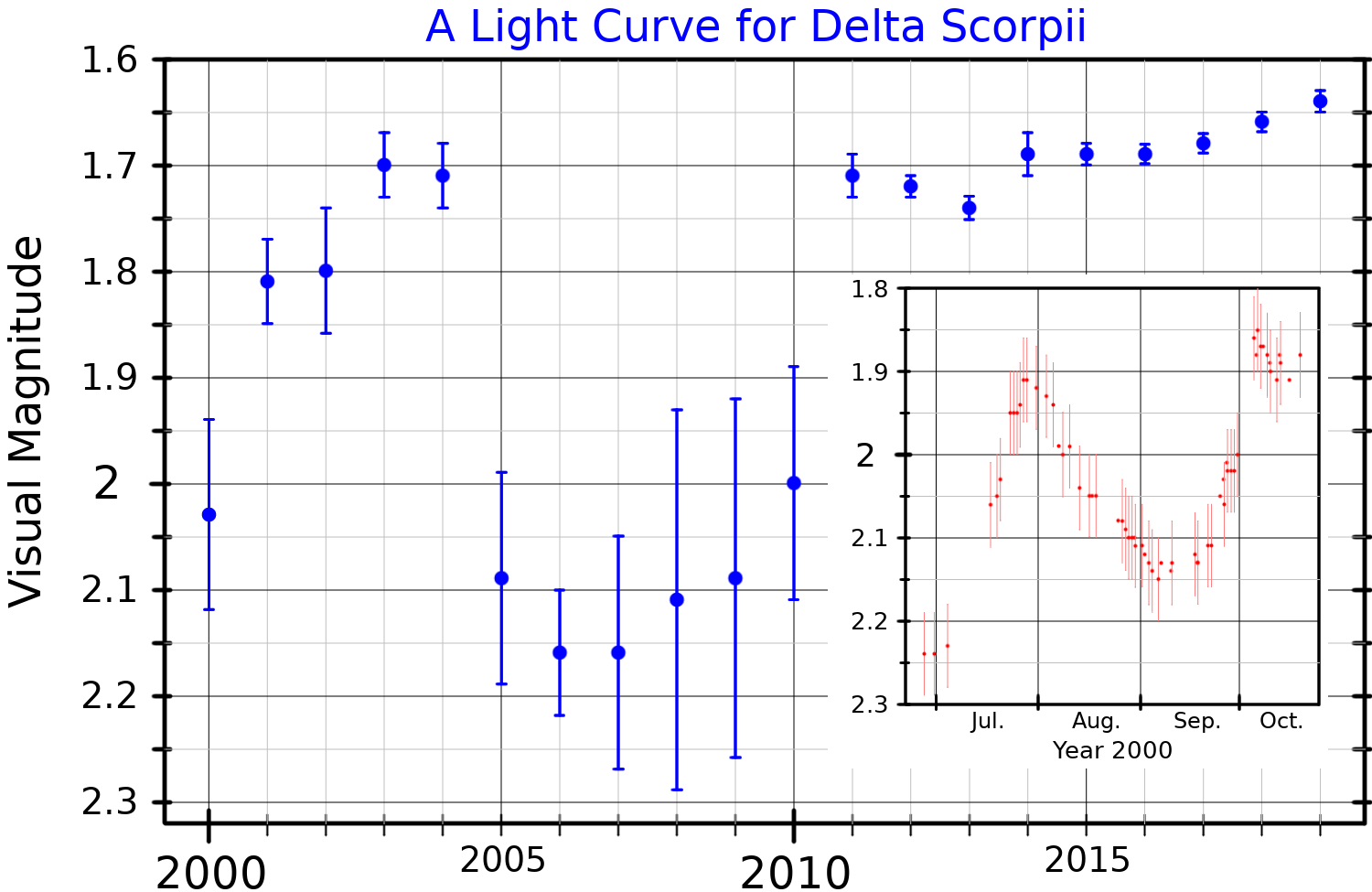
A visual band light curve for Delta Scorpii. The main plot (adapted from Suffak et al.) shows the long-term variability, and the inset plot (adapted from Miroshnichenko et al.) shows the brightening which occurred in 2000.

Delta Scorpii is 2.0 degrees south of the ecliptic. It is a binary star with two components of magnitudes 2.4 and 4.6 separated by 0.2″. In 1981 it was occulted by Saturn's rings as seen by Voyager 2, with starlight unexpectedly blocked even by the apparently empty gaps, indicating that "there is very little empty space anywhere in the main ring system."

=== Variability ===
Delta Scorpii A is a Gamma Cassiopeiae variable star. This type of star shows irregular slow brightness variations of a few hundredths of a magnitude due to material surrounding the star.

In June 2000 Delta Scorpii was observed by Sebastian Otero to be 0.1 magnitudes brighter than normal; its brightness has varied since then and has reached at least as high as magnitude 1.6, altering the familiar appearance of Scorpius. Spectra taken after the outburst began have shown that the star is throwing off luminous gases from its equatorial region. The companion passed close by in 2011, again resulting in the star peaking at 1.65 between 5 and 15 July 2011.

== Nomenclature ==
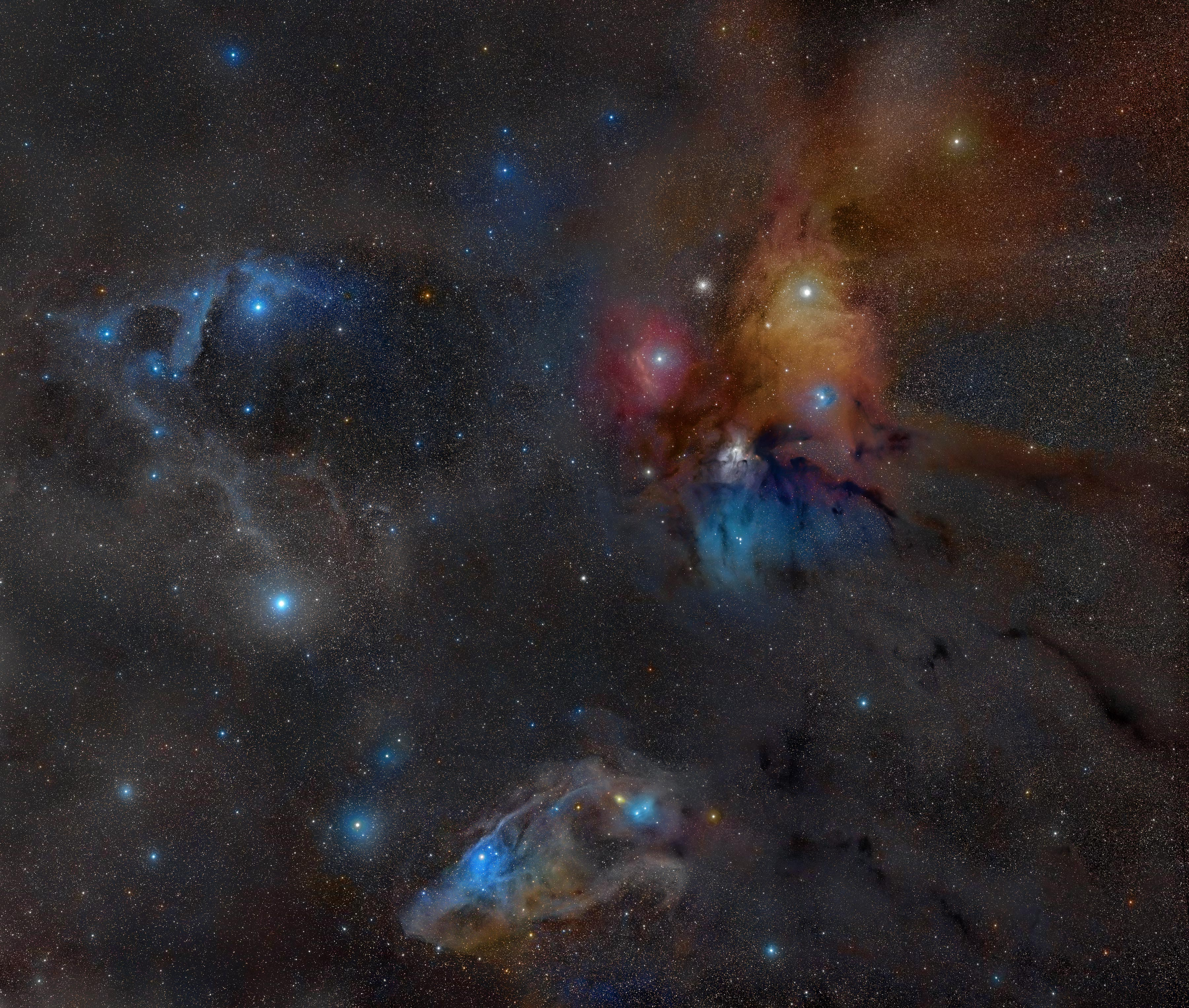
ρ Ophiuchi region. δ Scorpii is the bright white star on the left (north is down).

δ Scorpii (Latinised to Delta Scorpii) is the system's Bayer designation. The two components are designated Delta Scorpii A and B.

Delta Scorpii bore the traditional name Dschubba, which comes from Arabic جبهة العقرب jabhet al-aqrab meaning 'the forehead of the scorpion'. In 2016 the International Astronomical Union organized a Working Group on Star Names (WGSN) to catalogue and standardize proper names for stars. The WGSN approved the name Dschubba for δ Scorpii A on 21 August 2016 and it is now so entered in the IAU Catalog of Star Names.

In Chinese, 房宿 (Fáng Xiù), meaning Room, refers to an asterism consisting of δ Scorpii, β^{1} Scorpii, β^{2} Scorpii, π Scorpii, and ρ Scorpii. Consequently, the Chinese name for δ Scorpii itself is 房宿三 (Fáng Xiù sān), "the Third Star of Room".

== Properties ==
δ Scorpii was once used as a spectroscopic standard for the B0 IV classification, but is now considered too unusual and variable.

The primary, δ Scorpii A, is a B class subgiant surrounded by a disc of material spun off by the rapidly rotating star. The secondary, δ Scorpii B, orbits every 10.5 years in a highly elongated elliptical orbit; it appears to be a normal B class main sequence star. There have been reports that Delta Scorpii A is itself a very close spectroscopic binary, but this does not appear to be the case.

δ Scorpii is a proper motion member of the Upper Scorpius subgroup of the Scorpius–Centaurus OB association, the nearest such co-moving association of massive stars to the Sun. The Upper Scorpius subgroup contains thousands of young stars with mean age 11 million years at average distance of 470 light years (145 parsecs).
