= Taittirīya Brāhmaṇa =

Appendix of the Hindu Taittirīya Samhita

The Taittirīya Brāhmaṇa (Sanskrit तैत्तिरीयब्राह्मण, meaning 'Brāhmaṇa of the school of Tittri', abbreviated to 'TB') is a commentary on the Krishna Yajurveda. Considered by academics to be an appendix or extension of the Taittirīya Samhita, the first two books (ashṭakas) largely consist of hymns and Mantras to the Vedic-era Devas, as well as Mythology, astronomy, and astrology (i.e. the Nakshatras); the third book contains commentaries and instructions on Vedic sacrificial rites such as the Purushamedha, Kaukili-Sutramani, Ashvamedha, and Agnicayana.

Recorded around 300–400 BCE, it is prevalent in southern India in areas such in Andhra Pradesh, south and east of Narmada (Gujarat), and areas on the banks of the Godavari river down to the sea.

== Nomenclature ==
The Taittirīya Brāhmaṇa (Sanskrit तैत्तिरीयब्राह्मण) can be loosely translated as 'explanations of the sacred knowledge of the school of Tittiri'.

- Brāhmaṇa (ब्राह्मण) means 'explanations of sacred knowledge or doctrine'.
- Taittirīya (तैत्तिरीय) is derived from the name of the sage Tittiri, (तित्तिरि). It is pronounced as 'tai-ti-ree-yah'.

=== Tittiri ===
According to the Monier-Williams Sanskrit Dictionary, the sage Tittiri (or Taittiri) was a pupil of Yaska (estimated 300-400 BCE). According to the Vishnu Purana, Yaska was, in turn, a pupil of Vaiśampáyana (estimated 500 BCE). Tittiri is also stated in the Mahabharata to have attended 'the Yaga [Vedic ritual sacrifice] conducted by Uparicaravasu' (Dvapara Yuga, before 3000 BCE).

H.H. Wilson states that 'the term Taittiríya is more rationally accounted for in the Anukramańí or index of the Krishna Yajurveda. It is there said that Vaiśampáyana taught it to Yaska, who taught it to Tittiri, who also became a teacher; whence the term Taittiríya, for a grammatical rule, explains it to mean, 'The Taittiríyas are those who read what was said or repeated by Tittiri'.'

== Summary ==
=== Relation to the YajurVeda ===
The Indira Gandhi National Centre for the Arts (IGNCA) states that the Taittirīya Brāhmaṇa 'belongs to Krishna Yajurveda and [is] divided into three khandas [or ashṭakas, i.e. books]... It has both [a mixture] of Mantras and Brahmans [instructions or explanations] and [is] composed in poetic and prose manner'.

A.B Keith states that 'at a comparatively early period the formulae [i.e. mantras from the Samhitas of the YajurVeda] were accompanied by explanations, called Brahmanas, texts pertaining to the Brahman or sacred lore, in which the different acts of the ritual were given Symbolical interpretations, the words of the texts commented on, and stories told to illustrate the sacrificial performance... a mass of old material, partly formulae, partly Brahmana, which had not been incorporated in the Taittiriya Samhita was collected together in the Taittiriya Brahmana, which in part contains matter more recent than the Samhita, but in part has matter as old as, at any rate, the later portions of that text'.

M. Winternitz adds that the 'Taittiriya-Brahmana of the Krishna Yajurveda is nothing but a continuation of the Taittiriya-Samhita [hymns and mantras], for the Brahmanas were already included in the Samhitas of the Krishna YajurVeda. The Taittiriya-Brahmana, therefore, contains only later additions to the Samhita'. S. Shrava concurs, elaborating that 'This brahmana is an appendix to the Taittirīya saṁhitā. The main purpose of expounding the brahmana was to complete the incomplete portions of the main saṁhitā. It abounds with hymns... a subtle form of the story of Yama and Nachiketā is available in the brahmana [see Katha Upanishad of the Katha Shakha, also related to the Krishna YajurVeda]’.

=== Structure ===
Shrava states that the 'Taittirīya Brāhmaṇa has three ashṭakas [books]. The first two ashṭakas are named as pārakshudra and agnihotra. Portions of the third ashṭaka are individually named [i.e. after the sacrificial rites expounded, etc.]. These three ashṭakas have 28 prapāṭhakas [chapters]. Bhaṭṭa Bhāskara, in his commentary names these as praśnas. [His] edition published from Mysore enumerated 78 anuvākas [sections] in the first [ashṭaka], 96 in the second and 179 in the third ashṭaka, i.e. 353 anuvākas in all’.

R.L. Kashyap further elaborates while differing from Sharva slightly, stating that each ashṭaka of the Taittirīya Brāhmaṇa 'is divided into Prapāṭhakas which are divided into anuvāka-s. Each anuvāka is a long rhythmic prose passage without any punctuation. Ashṭaka 1 has 8 Prapāṭhakas, Ashṭaka 2 has 8 Prapāṭhakas, [and] Ashṭaka 3 has 12 Prapāṭhakas. All these 28 Prapāṭhakas (8+8+12) have 338 anuvākas [15 less than stated by Shrava]. The name Ashṭaka is given because each main part has 8 main parts or Prapāṭhaka[s]'.

Ashṭakas		Prapāṭhakas	Anuvākas (Kashyap)	Anuvākas (Sharva)	Anuvākas (Rajendralala)	Khanḍikas (Kashyap)
1	Pārakshudra	8	78	78	-	-
2	Agnihotra	8	86	96	96	about 1150
3	(Various)	12	174	179	164	–
	Total	28	338	353 (+15)		

=== Ashṭakas and Prapāṭhakas ===
Based on information provided by Kashyap and R. Mitra, the chapters (prapāṭhakas) for each of the books (ashṭakas or sometimes referred to as kandas) are as follows:

- Ashṭaka 1: Pārakshudra
  - Prapāṭhaka 1: Explanation for the establishment of Agni
  - Prapāṭhaka 2: (Devas, chants, Vishuvat, Solstices, Mahavrata, and the bird-shaped altar)
  - Prapāṭhaka 3: Vajapeya Yajna
  - Prapāṭhaka 4: Explanation of Soma offerings
  - Prapāṭhaka 5: The powers of stars or Nakshatras, rites and Rigveda Mantras
  - Prapāṭhaka 6: (Unknown)
  - Prapāṭhaka 7: (Unknown)
  - Prapāṭhaka 8: (Unknown)
- Ashṭaka 2: Agnihotra
  - Prapāṭhaka 1: The Agnihotra Sacrifice
  - Prapāṭhaka 2: Dasahotra Sacrifice
  - Prapāṭhaka 3: Dasahotra Sacrifices concluded
  - Prapāṭhaka 4: Mantras for Subsidiary Sacrifices or Upahomas
  - Prapāṭhaka 5: Mantras for Subsidiary Sacrifices or Upahomas (Concluded)
  - Prapāṭhaka 6: Kaukila Sautramani or the Sacrifice with Spirituous Liquor
  - Prapāṭhaka 7: Ephemeral Sacrifices or Savas
  - Prapāṭhaka 8: Sacrifices with especial prayers (Kamya)
- Ashṭaka 3: (Various)
  - Prapāṭhaka 1: Sacrifices to the Constellations – Nakshatra Ishti
  - Prapāṭhaka 2: Dars'a Ya'ga or Sacrifices meet on the wane of the Moon
  - Prapāṭhaka 3: Paurnamasa Ishti or Ceremonies to be performed on the full moon
  - Prapāṭhaka 4: On Human sacrifices
  - Prapāṭhaka 5: Ishti Sacrifices
  - Prapāṭhaka 6: Pa'Shuka Hotra
  - Prapāṭhaka 7: Expiations for defects in the performance of ceremonies
  - Prapāṭhaka 8: On the operations of the first day of the Asvamedha sacrifice
  - Prapāṭhaka 9: On the operations of the second and third days of the horse sacrifice
  - Prapāṭhaka 10: Sa'vitra-Chayana or collection of fire for the adoration of the sun
  - Prapāṭhaka 11: Nachiketa-Chayana, or collection of Nachiketa Fire
  - Prapāṭhaka 12: Cha-tur-hotra and Vaisvasrij ceremonies

== Ashṭaka 1: Pārakshudra ==
=== The Nakshatras ===
[If] there is a person who loves riches and feels that 'may all persons give me riches' [then] he should worship Agni in the Phalguni Star. For the Phalguni star the deity is Aryaman. He gives in charity [and] is said to be sacred (aryama). Persons desire to give him riches.

— Taittiriya Brahmana (Volume 1), translated by R.L. Kashyap (2017), Ashtaka 1, Prapathaka 1, Anuvaka 2, Khandika 4

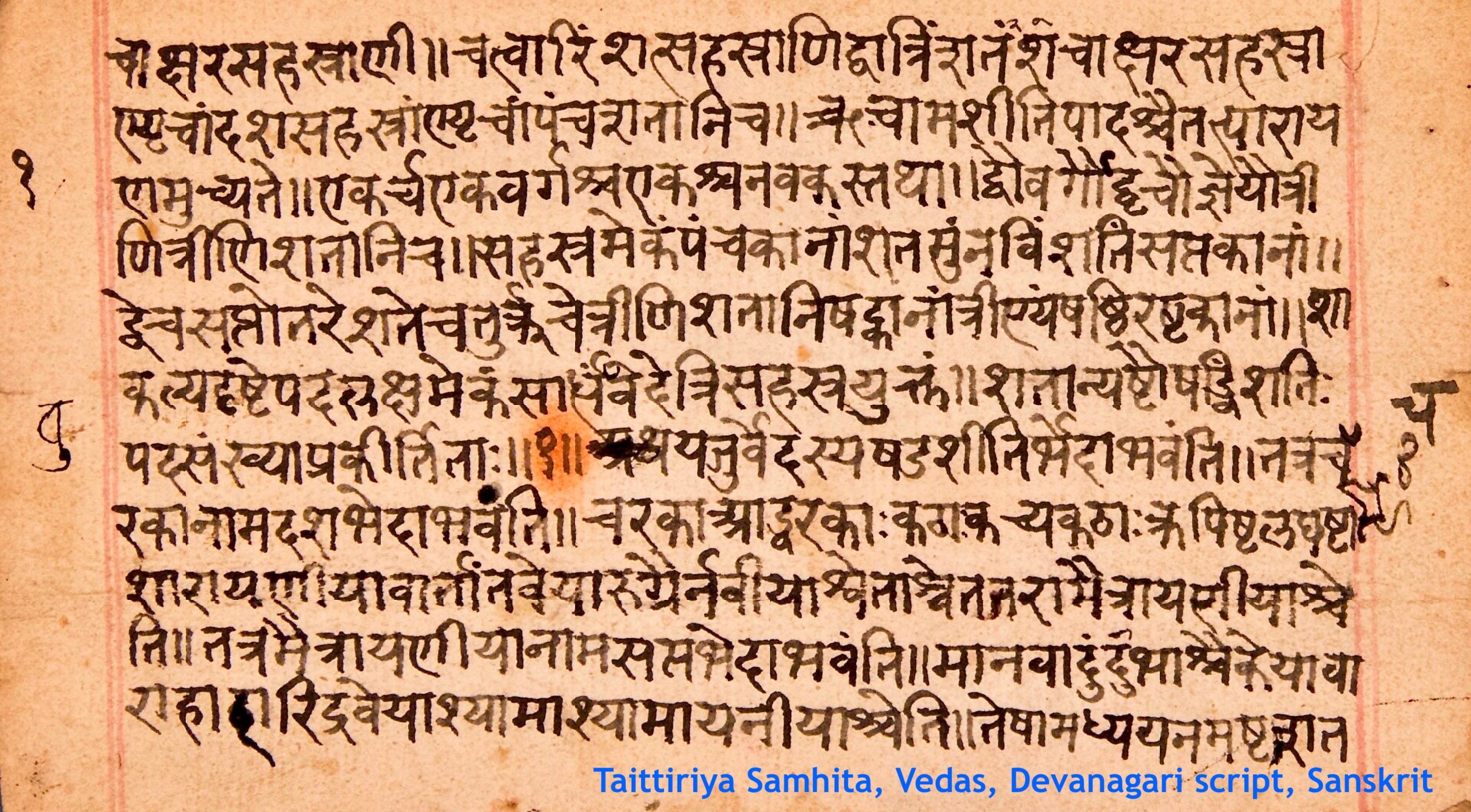
Page of the Taittirīya Samhita (Sanskrit).

D.M. Harness states that the ''stars of the Zodiacal belt had a particular importance as reflecting and projecting heavenly influences that the Planets travelling through them energised... The Vedic Nakshatras arose from a spiritual perception of the cosmos. Nakshatras are the mansions of the Gods or cosmic powers and of the Rishis or sages. They can also project negative or anti-divine forces, just as certain planets like Saturn have well known malefic effects. The term Nakshatra refers to a means (tra) of worship (naksha) or approach... The Nakshatras dispense the fruits of karma... For this reason Vedic rituals and Meditations to the present day follow the timing of the Nakshatras... [which] are of prime [importance] in muhurta or electional astrology for determining favorable times for actions, particularly sacramental or sacred actions like marriage... A system of 28 lunar mansions [i.e. Nakshatras] was used in the Middle East and in China as well. But in the West it was all but forgotten by a greater emphasis on the twelve signs of the Zodiac... Indeed, it could be argued that the signs arose from the Nakshatras'.

Kashyap adds that the 28 Nakshatras - usually clusters rather than single stars - also determine favourable (and unfavourable) times for birth, elaborating that the 'star which is nearest to the moon at their birth-time is the birth-star... [and] Each star has its own deity'. The Nakshatras are detailed in 1.1.2, 1.5.1 (ashṭaka 1); and 3.1.1 and 3.1.2 (ashṭaka 3, see below). Kashyap lists them with corresponding deities, common names, and names in Astronomy (Volume 1, Appendix 3):

	Nakshatra	Deity or Deva	Common name	Name in Astronomy		Nakshatra	Deity or Deva	Common name	Name in Astronomy
1	Kṛttika	Agni	Alcyone	Tauri	15	Anūrādha	Mitra	Dashubba	Scorpii
2	Rohiṇi	Prajāpati	Aldebran	Tauri	16	Jyeṣhta	Indra	Antares	Scorpii
3	Mrigashira	Soma	Meissa	Orionis	17	Mūla	Nirṛti	Shaula	Scorpii
4	Ardra	Rudra	Betelgeuse	Orionis	18	Purva Āshāḍha	Āpaḥ	Alnasl	Sagittarii
5	Punarvasu	Aditi	Pollux	Geminor	19	Uttara Āshāḍha	Visvedevaḥ	Nunki	Sagittarii
6	Tishya / Pushya	Bṛhaspati	Asellus. Aus.	Cancri	20	Abhijit	Brahma	Vega	Lyrae
7	Āshresa / Aslesa	Sarpaḥ	Acubens	Cancri	21	Shroṇā / Sharvana	Vishṇu	Altair	Aquilae
8	Magha	Pitaraḥ	Regulus	Leonis	22	Sraviṣhṭha / Dhaniṣhṭha	Vasavaḥ	Rotanev	Delphini
9	Purva Phalguni	Aryamaṇa	Zosma	Leonis	23	Shatabhishaja	Varuṇa	Hydor	Aquarii
10	Uttara Phalguni	Bhaga	Danebola	Leonis	24	Purva Proṣhṭhapada	Aja Ekapād	Markeb	Pegasi
11	Hasta	Savitar	Algorab	Corvi	25	Uttara Proṣhṭhapada	Ahirbudhnya	Algenib	Pegasi
12	Chitra	Tvashtar	Spica	Virginis	26	Revati	Pūshan	Revati	Piscium
13	Svāti / Nishtya	Vāyu	Arcturus	Bootis	27	Ashvayuja	Ashvinau	Sheratan	Arietis
14	Vishākha	Indragni	Zub. el. Ge	Libra	28	Apabharaṇī	Yamarājā	Bharani	Arietis

=== Avatars of Vishnu ===
==== Varaha the Boar Avatar ====
In primordial times, the entire universe was covered with moving waters. Prajapati was amazed and engaged in tapas to understand [what was] happening. How did it happen? He saw a lotus petal (pushkaraparna). He thought, Yes, there is something that wants to come out. Transforming himself into a boar, he went inside the water. He went into the earth deep below. There, he saw soft mud. Then, he spread that mud on [the] pushkaraparna (lotus leaf). Whatever may have happened, the basic nature of earth was retrained in the land (wet mud). In that land Bhumitva (earth-nature) was retained. To dry the wet land the creator commanded Vayu to blow on the wet lands. Then that land was full of gravel (or sand mixed with gravel). He realised that the land was full of peace (and fertile)... The land discovered (or prepared) by the boar (varaha) had the materials needed for performing [a] yajna...

— Taittiriya Brahmana (Volume 1), translated by R.L. Kashyap (2017), Ashtaka 1, Prapathaka 1, Anuvaka 3, Khandikas 6–7

Varaha is primarily associated with the Puranic legend of lifting the Earth out of the cosmic ocean. A.A. Macdonell states that this 'boar appears in a cosmogonic character in the SB [Shatapatha Brahmana] (14, 1, 2) where under the name of Emũṣa he is stated to have raised up the earth from the waters. In the TS [Taittirīya Samhita] (7, 1, 5) this cosmogonic boar, which raised the earth from the primeval waters, is described as a form of Prajāpati. This modification of the myth is further expanded in the TB [Taittirīya Brāhmaṇa] (1, 1, 3). In the post-Vedic mythology of the Rāmāyana and the Purãṇas, the boar which raises the earth, has become of the Avatar of Vishnu'. Varaha is also mentioned in 1.7.9.56 ('yád varāháḥ'), but an English translation has not been found.

==== Vamana the Dwarf Avatar ====
When the completion of yajna does not happen in a year (samvatsara) then everything is not stable. Then one has to seek the grace of Vishnu (Vamana) by performing a special rite on the ekadashi day. Yajna means Vishnu (worshipping Vishnu). They perform yajna only for stabilising. They depend on Indra and Agni. Indra and Agni gibe the abode for Gods (devas). Devas only seek shelter in them and only depend on them.

— Taittiriya Brahmana (Volume 1), translated by R.L. Kashyap (2017), Ashtaka 1, Prapathaka 2, Anuvaka 5, Khandika 1

Vamana is primarily associated with the Puranic legend of taking back the three worlds from the Asura-king Bali in three steps. Here Vamana is explicitly mentioned in the Taittirīya Brāhmaṇa; the Sanskrit transliteration for this mention is (emphasis added): ' vaiṣṇaváṃ vāmanám ā́labante' (1.2.5.40.4). As illustrated in the section below for ashṭaka 2, there are also several references to 'Vishnu steps' or 'Vishnu strides', associated with the Vamana avatar.

==== Narasimha the Man-Lion Avatar ====
You both (Ashvins) drink sura [alcohol] along with the Asura Namucha. You are protectors of happiness and are Soma-drinkers. You both protect the Indra-power in the Yajamana.

— Taittiriya Brahmana (Volume 1), translated by R.L. Kashyap (2017), Ashtaka 1, Prapathaka 4, Anuvaka 2, Khandika 1

Narasimha is primarily associated with the Puranic legend of destroying the Asura-king Hiranyakashipu to protect the king's devotee son, Prahlada. D.A. Soifer states that 'Brahmana literature yields what must be considered as the prototype of that [Narasimha] myth, the Indra-Namuchi myth', adding that other academics such as Devasthali concur that although elements of the Namuchi legend are 'scattered throughout Brahmana literature (cf. VS [Vajaseneyi Samhita] 10.34; PB [Pancavimsa Brahmana] 12.6.8, MS [Maitrayani Samhita] IV.34; [and] TB [Taittirīya Brāhmaṇa] 1.7.1.6)', the fullest version is in the Śatapatha Brāhmaṇa.

An English translation of TB 1.7.1.6 referred to by Soifer has not been found. The TITUS Sanskrit transliteration for this mention is (emphasis added): 'námucim āsuráṃ na álabata' (1.7.1.6.3). An indirect reference to the legend via a mention of Namuchi from 1.4.2.1 has been cited instead, as above. Notably, Prahlada, the Vaishnava son of Hiranyakashipu in Puranic literature such as the Bhagavata Purana, is also mentioned (e.g. 1.5.9.1 and 1.5.10.8) where he is explicitly stated to be the son of Kayadhu (wife of Hiranyakashipu).

=== Kali Yuga ===
There are four well-known stomas [hymns or mantras] which have to be recited. However because of the (evil) effects of Kali Yuga, (some say that) there are 5 stomas. (It is not correct), there are only four stomas as part of the Jyotishtoma (yajna).

— Taittiriya Brahmana (Volume 1), translated by R.L. Kashyap (2017), Ashtaka 1, Prapathaka 5, Anuvaka 1, Khandika 11

There are four yugas in each cyclical era in Hinduism, with Kali Yuga, the present yuga, being the last and most destructive. K. Ishwaran seems to incorrectly state that 'there seems to be no unequivocal reference to the cyclical notion of time in the Sruti [literature]... the word yuga does not mean an age or the theory of four yugas (Kane 1946:886-8), and the words Krta, Treta, Dvapara and Kali mean throws of dice (1946:886-8). The word Kali Yuga does not occur at all. Words like Krta Yuga occur (Ṣaḍviṃṡa Brāhmaṇa V.6) but are not a part of any scheme of cosmic cycles'.

This assertion would however seems to be contradicted by the Taittirīya Brāhmaṇa. In the first instance (1.5.1, above), the assertion of Ishwaran, Kane, etc., would mean a throw of dice would affect whether one should recite four or five stomas for the Jyotishtoma sacrifice, which is nonsensical (the Jyotishtoma sacrifice itself requires 'sixteen officiating priests... It is a sacrifice considered as the typical form of a whole class of sacrificial ceremonies. E. jyotis light, and stoma a sacrifice'). In addition, 3.4.16 (Anuvāka 16, enumerated in the section on the third ashṭaka) is listed as (emphasis added) 'To the presiding divinities of dice and of the Satya Yuga, etc., dice-players, those who frequent gambling halls, and the like...'. Thus, the concept of the yugas are connected with dice but do not seem to the same thing.

=== Animal welfare ===
[The] (Sun-god) Sūrya is worshipped for accepting and helping animals. By worshipping [the] sun, there is all-round development. The animal offering is possible (without any violence).

— Taittiriya Brahmana (Volume 1), translated by R.L. Kashyap (2017), Ashtaka 1, Prapathaka 2, Anuvaka 3, Khandika 2

Kashyap comments on a rite detailed in (1.1.6.8) that 'Offering an animal to Rudra does not mean that the animal is killed. Often the animal which is offered becomes free and it lives on the grass in the common pasture of the community without being controlled by a human. The idea is mentioned in several places in the Yajur Veda'. Other relevant extracts include

- 1.1.8.4: 'Animals are for non-violence'.
- 1.1.9.7: 'During this vrata... One should not eat meat (māmsam)'.

== Ashṭaka 2: Agnihotra ==
The Rishi questioned the priest "What is the aim or goal in performing the sattra Yajna? The answer: Now we are unable to grow the grass and plants needed by the cow. By doing this Yajna, the rains will be released from Heaven (diva). These drops of water will make the plants grow (feeding the cow). The fathers (pitara) have the understanding (visha) of the Agnihotra and hence cause the rains...

— Taittiriya Brahmana (Volume 2), translated by R.L. Kashyap (2017), Ashtaka 2, Prapathaka 1, Anuvaka 1, Khandika 2

P. Mitra states that the Agnihotra is an oblation to the fire-god, Agni. According to M. Rajendralala, as 'a manual of rituals the first kanda [or prapāṭhaka] of the Taittirīya Brahmana opens with Agnihotra or the establishment of the household fire. This was the first duty of every householder and of a Brahman immediately after being invested with the Brahmanical cord, and marriage. Every householder and his wife had to devote their careful attention to the maintenance of this fire and to offering to it oblations of butter and the booking thereon of frumenty [a dish of hulled wheat boiled in milk].'

=== Prapāṭhakas and Anuvākas ===
Mitra details all chapters (prapāṭhakas) and sections (anuvākas) of the second book (ashṭaka) with descriptive titles (8 prapāṭhakas, consisting of 96 anuvākas; original spelling unchanged):

- Prapāṭhaka 1: The Agnihotra Sacrifice
  - Anuvāka 1: Preliminaries regarding the Agnihotra
  - Anuvāka 2: Agnihotra defined
  - Anuvāka 3: Purification and manipulation of the clarified butter, etc.
  - Anuvāka 4: Subsidiary details regarding the performance of the ceremony
  - Anuvāka 5: Subsidiary details regarding the articles required for the sacrifice
  - Anuvāka 6: Creation of the sacrificial cow, the boiling of the sacrificial milk, and the omission of the Homa
  - Anuvāka 7: Milk in its different states and the divinities who like it most on those states
  - Anuvāka 8: Details of milking a cow
  - Anuvāka 9: Some Mantras of the Agnihotra
  - Anuvāka 10: Different states of the sacrificial fire and the advantages of offering oblations thereon
  - Anuvāka 11: Different modes of pouring the oblation
- Prapāṭhaka 2: Dasahotra Sacrifice
  - Anuvāka 1: Details of Chitti, Chetta and other sacrifices to the number ten described in the Aranyaka
  - Anuvāka 2: Employment of different numbers of priests in different sacrifices, and the application of certain preliminary Mantras
  - Anuvāka 3: Praises of the Chaturhotra Mantras, etc.
  - Anuvāka 4: Praises of the mantras regarding the hotri-sacrifices
  - Anuvāka 5: Acceptance of Dakshina or fee for performing a sacrifice
  - Anuvāka 6: Hotri mantras in connexion with the 10th night of the Dasahotri ceremony
  - Anuvāka 7: Praises of the Sapta-hotri-mantra
  - Anuvāka 8: Relation of the Hotri-mantras to the Soma Yaga
  - Anuvāka 9: Creation of the world in connexion with the origin of Hotrimantras
  - Anuvāka 10: Supremacy of Indra
  - Anuvāka 11: Application of the Hotri mantras
- Prapāṭhaka 3: Dasahotra Sacrifices concluded
  - Anuvāka 1: On the Uses of the Chatur-Hotri-mantra, i.e., those used by the four officiating priests Hota, Addharya, Agnidhra, and Brahma
  - Anuvāka 2: On the Application of the Hotri-mantras to periodical rites
  - Anuvāka 3: On shedding the hair of the head in conexion with Hotri rites
  - Anuvāka 4: Purport of the mantras for the acceptance of fees
  - Anuvāka 5: Questions to be asked by the officiating priests on the 10th day of the twelve-day rite, and the replies thereto hy the householder
  - Anuvāka 6: Number of Rittikas to be employed on different sacrifices
  - Anuvāka 7: On the Merits of the Agni-hotra. – The advantages of employing different numbers of rittikas to officiate at different rites
  - Anuvāka 8: On the Merits of the Agni-hotra, (continued). – The creation of the Asuras, the Pitris, mankind and the Devas – through the Hotri mantras
  - Anuvāka 9: On the mode of reflecting upon the Agni-hotra and the advantages thereof
  - Anuvāka 10: On the Praises of the Hotri mantras
  - Anuvāka 11: On the Praises of the Hotri mantras, (concluded)
- Prapāṭhaka 4: Mantras for Subsidiary Sacrifices or Upahomas
  - Anuvāka 1: Upahoma Mantras
  - Anuvāka 2–8: Upahoma Mantras, (concluded).
- Prapāṭhaka 5: Mantras for Subsidiary Sacrifices or Upahomas (Concluded).
  - Anuvāka 1–7: Upahoma Mantras, (continued).
  - Anuvāka 8: Upahoma Mantras, (concluded).
- Prapāṭhaka 6: Kaukila Sautramani or the Sacrifice with Spiritous Liquor
  - Anuvāka 1: On the Preparation of the spirituous liquor
  - Anuvāka 2: Addresses to the spirit
  - Anuvāka 3: Homas or fire-sacrifices in connexion with the spirit
  - Anuvāka 4: Upahoma or subsidiary sacrifices in connection with the above
  - Anuvāka 5: The abbisheka or bathing ceremony of the instituter of the sacrifice
  - Anuvāka 6: Bathing after the completion of the ceremony
  - Anuvāka 7: Eleven exhortations (Prayaja Praisha) to be addressed by Mitra and Varuna to the Hotra
  - Anuvāka 8: Eleven addresses (Puro-ruk) in connexion with the above
  - Anuvāka 10: Eleven exhortations (Praisha) in connexion with the Anuyajas or subsidiary oblations
  - Anuvāka 11: Exhortations (Prayaja Praisha) with reference to the three animals to be sacrifices in the Kaukila Sautramani
  - Anuvāka 12: Oblative mantras (Prayaja Yajya) corresponding to Exhortations of the eleventh Section [Anuvāka]
  - Anuvāka 13: Invocatory and Oblative Mantras for the offering of Omentum, rice cake and clarified butter, each three times
  - Anuvāka 14: Exhortations (Praisha) of Mitra and Varuna in relation to the Anuyajas
  - Anuvāka 15: Exhortation to Sutravaka
  - Anuvāka 16: Mantras relating to offerings to the manes
  - Anuvāka 17: Exhortations (Praisha) for the Prayaja in animal sacrifices to Indra
  - Anuvāka 18: Oblative mantras called Apri
  - Anuvāka 19: Invocatory and oblative mantras for the sacrifice alluded to in Section [Anuvāka] 18
  - Anuvāka 20: Exhortations (Praisha) in connexion with the Anuyajas
- Prapāṭhaka 7: Ephemeral Sacrifices or Savas [footnote: A sacrifice lasting generally one day and deifying anyone with an especial object, is called a sava]
  - Anuvāka 1: Vrihaspati Sava or the sacrifice for attaining the rank of Vrihaspati
  - Anuvāka 2: Vaisya Sava or the sacrifice for the attainment of nourishment or prosperity
  - Anuvāka 3: Bramhana Sava or the sacrifice for the attainment of the glory of Brahma
  - Anuvāka 4: Soma Sava or the sacrifice for the attainment of offspring
  - Anuvāka 5: Prithi Sava or the sacrifice for the attainment of Supremacy
  - Anuvāka 6: Go Sava or the sacrifice for the attainment of independence
  - Anuvāka 7: Odana Sava or the sacrifice for the attainment of profusion of aliment
  - Anuvāka 8: Odana Sava (Continued). Mantras to be repeated when ascending a car
  - Anuvāka 9: Odana Sava (Concluded). Its origin and details
  - Anuvāka 10: Rules for the panchas'aradiya sacrifice
  - Anuvāka 11: Animal meet for the sacrifice aforesaid
  - Anuvāka 12: Addresses (Puroruks) in connexion with the Agnishtut sacrifice
  - Anuvāka 13: Addresses (Puroruks) in connexion with the Indrastut sacrifice
  - Anuvāka 14: Aptoryama rite by which animals intended for sacrifice, if lost, may be regained
  - Anuvāka 15: Rules for emblematic coronation ceremony
  - Anuvāka 16: Coronation ceremony (continued). Ceremony to be observed on first ascending a care, Rotharohana mantra
  - Anuvāka 17: Coronation ceremony (Concluded).
  - Anuvāka 18: Ephemeral or Vighana ceremony
- Prapāṭhaka 8: Sacrifices with especial prayers (Kamya)
  - Anuvāka 1: Sacrifices of goats, etc.
  - Anuvāka 2: Sacrifices of sheep
  - Anuvāka 3: Sacrifices to Soma, Vishnu, Indra, etc.
  - Anuvāka 4: On the sacrifice of animals to Indra, etc.
  - Anuvāka 5: On the sacrifices of animals to Indra and Agni
  - Anuvāka 6: On the sacrifices of animals meet for Savita
  - Anuvāka 7: On the sacrifices of animals meet for Surya (Sauryadipas'n).
  - Anuvāka 8: On the sacrifices of animals that have miscarried
  - Anuvāka 9: On the sacrifice of birth and death of animals

=== The Kaukili Sautramani Sacrifice ===
A.B. Keith states that the Kaukili (, Kaukila or Kaukila) 'Sautramani is not a Soma sacrifice, but is classified by the Sutras as a Haviryajna, though its chief characteristic in its form as recorded is the offering of Surā [liquor]. It has two distinct forms, the Kaukili, which is an independent offering, the other the Carakā, an offering which forms part of another offering, as the Rājasūya [performed by ancient kings of India] and the Agnicayana [building of a Fire-Altar]... The differences between the two forms are of detail: thus the Kaukili is marked by the singing by the Brahman of certain Sāmans [hymns]. The use of the Surā is accompanied by offerings of animals, to Indra a bull, to Sarasvati a sheep, and to the Ashvins a goat'.

R. Woodard adds that 'the Vedic Sautramani belongs chiefly to Indra, taking its name from his epithet Satraman, 'good protector'. The Vedic rite is, however, rather complex; while Indra is the principal recipient, deities of the realm of fertility and fecundity [reproduction] figure prominently'.

=== Avatars of Vishnu ===
==== Garuda the Mount of Vishnu, Kurma the Tortoise Avatar, and Krishna ====
The Devas said they want immortality. They said that Vaya (the bird Garuda) is the giver (or bringer) of Amrita. The bird doing the task of bringing the Amrita went back to Heaven.

— Taittiriya Brahmana (Volume 2), translated by R.L. Kashyap (2017), Ashtaka 2, Prapathaka 2, Anuvaka 5, Khandika 2

Kurma is most commonly associated in the Itihāsa (epics) and Puranas with the legend of the churning of the Ocean of Milk, referred to as the Samudra manthan. The ocean is churned with a mountain on the back of the Tortoise avatar to acquire the nectar of immortality called Amrita for the gods, led by Indra. From the Mahabharata:

The gods then went to the king of tortoises ['Kurma-raja'] and said to him, 'O Tortoise-king, thou wilt have to hold the mountain on thy back!' The Tortoise-king agreed, and Indra contrived to place the mountain on the former's back. And the gods and the Asuras made of Mandara [Mountain] a churning staff and Vasuki the cord, and set about churning the deep for amrita...

— Mahabharata (translated by Kisari Mohan Ganguli, 1883–1896), Book 1, Astika Parva, Chapter XVIII (18)

Garuda is also frequently mentioned in respect to Kurma and the Samudra manthan legend. For example, in the Mahabharata (1.29–31) Garuda seeks the Amrita produced by the churning of the ocean to free himself and his mother from slavery. In the Bhagavata Purana (Canto 8, Chapter 6), Krishna carries the Mandara mountain on the back of Garuda to the Ocean of Milk. The tortoise (kūrma or kurmo) is also mentioned in 2.4.3.6 (2.4.3.23 of the TITUS transliteration; emphasis added): asyá kurmo harivo medínaṃ tvā. Notably, 2.8.2.23 states that a mountain represents ignorance, and 2.4.6.21 states:

The wise (amūra) Devas who win all the worlds (kshetra) do the act of churning (manthan) the Vaishvānara to release the power of immortality (amṛta).

— Taittiriya Brahmana (Volume 2), translated by R.L. Kashyap (2017), Ashtaka 2, Prapathaka 4, Anuvaka 6, Khandika 21

==== Vamana the Dwarf Avatar ====
That Vishnu affirms on high by his mightiness, he is like a terrible lion that ranges in difficult places, yes, his abode is on the mountain-tops. In this three wide movements, all the worlds find their dwelling places.

— Taittiriya Brahmana (Volume 2), translated by R.L. Kashyap (2017), Ashtaka 2, Prapathaka 4, Anuvaka 3, Khandika 10

Vamana is most commonly associated with the Puranic legend of taking back the three worlds from the Asura-king Bali in three steps. N. Aiyangar notes that 'In the Rig-Veda Vishnu is celebrated for his three strides by which he measures the whole universe'. These so-called 'Vishnu-strides' (Symbolically) factor into Vedic sacrificial rites enumerated by Brahamical literature such as the Shatapatha Brāhmaṇa (e.g. 6.7.4.7–8) and the Taittirīya Brāhmaṇa (e.g. 2.4.3.10, as quoted, and 2.4.6.3).

==== Narasimha the Man-Lion Avatar ====
Narasimha is primarily associated with the Puranic legend of destroying the Asura-king Hiranyakashipu to protect the king's devotee son, Prahlada. Further references to Namuchi, considered by Soifer to be the 'prototype' of the Narasimha legend, are made in 2.6.3.3 (defeated by the Ashvins rather than Indra) and 2.6.13.1 (stole sacrificial offerings from Indra).

=== Duties of kingship ===
Impel the King to take care of the citizens just like a father. Impel the king to extend his kingdom (varimanam). When the king extends his kingdom helping all, the Deva Savita rewards him with many animals and all types of help.

Let the king take care of all the animals well, moving amidst them. When the king who has done the Rajasuya [rite] punishes only the bad persons appropriately, and rewards the good men, he is learning well the duties of a good king.

— Taittiriya Brahmana (Volume 2), translated by R.L. Kashyap (2017), Ashtaka 2, Prapathaka 7, Anuvaka 15, Khandikas 2–3

=== Animal welfare ===
Further to the duty of a king to take good care of animals (as elaborated in 2.7.15.2-3), Kashyap comments in regards to 2.1.1.4 that here 'is a brief mention of the human duty that the calves of the cow giving milk have the highest priority. Only after their needs are satisfied [is] the remaining milk... used for the Yajna. This discipline should be maintained for ten days and nights. If the milk remaining is given to the calves at night, then the Deva Rudra is not pleased since he is the lord of the cows. Ample milk should be given to the calves before the use of milk in the Yajna'.

=== Cutting down trees ===
May Varuna free us from the sins of cutting [down] valuable trees. As effectively as a bath washes off the sins done by me in handling the residues of the butter used in Yajna.

— Taittiriya Brahmana (Volume 2), translated by R.L. Kashyap (2017), Ashtaka 2, Prapathaka 6, Anuvaka 6, Khandika 8

== Ashṭaka 3 ==
Rajendralala states that the 'first subject treated of in the third kanda [ashṭaka, 'book'] are the Constellations, some of which are auspicious and others the contrary. Then we have the rites appropriate during the wane and waxing of the moon, Darsa paurnamasa, as well as on the full moon and the new moon. The fourth chapter treats of human sacrifices, and then of a number of minor rites with special prayers. Then follow the mantras appropriate for the sacrifice of special animals. This is followed by a chapter on expiations and defects in the observance and performance of ceremonies. The eighth and ninth [prapāṭhakas, 'chapters'] are devoted to the horse sacrifice, which is the grandest ceremony enjoined on householders, especially appropriate for kings, and involves a number of rites and ceremonies (which are fully detailed in the table of contents) as also a number of ovations of different kinds'.

=== Prapāṭhakas and Anuvākas ===
W. E. Hale and B. Smith cite issues 92–108 of the academic journal Proceedings of the American Philosophical Society, to enumerate the structure and content of the third ashṭaka. Mitra details all chapters (prapāṭhakas) and sections (anuvākas) with descriptive titles (12 prapāṭhakas, consisting of 164 listed anuvākas; original spelling unchanged):

- Prapāṭhaka 1: Sacrifices to the Constellations – Nakshatra Ishti
  - Anuvāka 1: Light Constellations. Deva Nakshatras
  - Anuvāka 2: Dark Constellations. – The Yama Nakshatras
  - Anuvāka 3: Invocatory and oblative Mantras for Sacrifices to the Moon (Chandramasa ishti), etc., etc.
  - Anuvāka 4: Sacrifices to the Light Constellations. – Deva Nakshatras
  - Anuvāka 5: Sacrifices to the Dark Constellations. – Yama Nakshatras
  - Anuvāka 6: Sacrifices (ishti) to Chandrama, etc.
- Prapāṭhaka 2: Dars'a Ya'ga or Sacrifices meet on the wane of the Moon
  - Anuvāka 1: Separation of calf from the cow
  - Anuvāka 2: Collection of the Kus'a Grass
  - Anuvāka 3: Milking at Night
  - Anuvāka 4: Duties enjoined on the first day of the Havirnivapa, Preparation of Paddy
  - Anuvāka 5: Husking of the Paddy
  - Anuvāka 6: Grinding of the rice
  - Anuvāka 7: Placing of earthen Baking-pans on the fire
  - Anuvāka 8: Baking of Rice Cake on the pans
  - Anuvāka 9: Preparation of the Altar
  - Anuvāka 10: Arranging of the sacrificial articles
- Prapāṭhaka 3: Paurnamasa Ishti or Ceremonies to be performed on the full moon
  - Anuvāka 1: Cleaning of the Sacrificial Vessels
  - Anuvāka 2: Disposal of the instruments for cleaning sacrificial vessels
  - Anuvāka 3: Offering of the clarified Butter
  - Anuvāka 4: Heating of the clarified Butter
  - Anuvāka 5: On looking at and taking the clarified Butter
  - Anuvāka 6: Placing of the Butter with fuel and Kus'a grass before it
  - Anuvāka 7: Offering of the first two sticks of wood (called Aghara) to the fire
  - Anuvāka 8: Eating of Ida and the Puridas'a rice cakes
  - Anuvāka 9: Lifting of the Srug [wooden ladel used for pouring clarified butter on a sacrificial fire], etc.
  - Anuvāka 10: Mantras relating to the wife of the Yajamana
  - Anuvāka 11: Throwing away of the Palas'a wood called Upavesha
- Prapāṭhaka 4: On Human sacrifices
  - Anuvāka 1: To Devas who claim to be the cases of brahmana, Kshatriya, etc., men of the Brahmana, Kshatriya, and the like castes, are to be sacrificed,...
  - Anuvāka 2: To those who claim pre-eminence in singing, dancing, etc., men of the Suta, Sailusha, and the like castes, ditto,...
  - Anuvāka 3: To those who are the presiding divinities of labour, magic, etc., men of the potter, ironsmith, and the like castes, ditto,...
  - Anuvāka 4: To those who are the presiding divinities of (abhimani) or delight in promiscuous intercourse (sanghataka), bastards, and the like, ditto,...
  - Anuvāka 5: To those who preside over rivers, desert places, etc., men of the Kaivarta (fishermen), Nishada (hunters) and the like castes, ditto,...
  - Anuvāka 6: To those who delight in marring huan exertion, etc., hunchbacks, dwarfs, and the like, ditto,...
  - Anuvāka 7: To those who preside over robbery, etc., thieves, sandal-mongers, and the like, ditto,...
  - Anuvāka 8: To those who preside over light, etc., men who collect fuel, firemen and the like, ditto,...
  - Anuvāka 9: To those who preside over rapid motion, elephant-keepers, grooms, etc., ditto,...
  - Anuvāka 10: To those who are the presiding divinities of violent passions, etc., ironsmiths, men who run away with criminals condemned to death, and the like, ditto,...
  - Anuvāka 11: To the wife of Yama, women who have borne twins, to those who preside over the mantras of the Atharva Veda, women who have miscarried, etc., etc.,...
  - Anuvāka 12: To those Devas who preside over tanks, ponds, etc., men who catch fish by putting up embankments (Dhivara), or by hooks (Dasa) and the like, ditto,...
  - Anuvāka 13: To those who preside over sounds, echoes, etc., collectors of news, retailers of incoherent speech, and the like, ditto,...
  - Anuvāka 14: To those who delight in detecting evil delight in splendor, etc., men who are always watchful, very sleepy, etc., ditto,...
  - Anuvāka 15: To the presiding divinities of wit, song, etc., prostitutes, female players on the Vina, and the like, ditto,...
  - Anuvāka 16: To the presiding divinities of dice and of the Satya Yuga, etc., dice-players, those who frequent gambling halls, and the like, ditto,...
  - Anuvāka 17: To the presiding divinities of land, fire, etc., men who move on crutches, those of the Chandala caste, and the like, ditto,...
  - Anuvāka 18: To the presiding divinities of speech, wind, etc., fat men, men of good wind, and the like, ditto,...
  - Anuvāka 19: To the presiding divinities of ugliness, ambition, etc., tall men, short men, and the like, ditto,...
- Prapāṭhaka 5: Ishti Sacrifices
  - Anuvāka 1: Mantra to be recited by the Hota
  - Anuvāka 2: Samidheni Mantras
  - Anuvāka 3: Nirid and Pracara Mantras
  - Anuvāka 4: Mantra for taking up the Sruk [wooden spoon used in sacrifices]
  - Anuvāka 5: Prayaja Mantras
  - Anuvāka 6: Mantras for offering clarified butter, Ajya
  - Anuvāka 7: Mantras for offering the rice cake
  - Anuvāka 8: Preliminary to the Yajamana's eating of the Ida or remnant of the offering
  - Anuvāka 9: Mantra for a supplementary offering – Anuyaja
  - Anuvāka 10: Mantra (Suktanika) to be repeated by the Hota when the addhvaryyu is about to throw the Darbha grass bundle into the fire
  - Anuvāka 11: Mantra in honor of Sanja, son of Brihaspati, – Sanjuvaka mantra
  - Anuvāka 12: Mantra for the offering of oblations to the Wives of the Gods, etc.
  - Anuvāka 13: Call for Ida for the wife of the Institutor of the sacrifice
- Prapāṭhaka 6: Pa'Shuka Hotra
  - Anuvāka 1: Purification of the Sacrificial Post to which the victim at a sacrifice is to be mounted
  - Anuvāka 2: Exhortative (praisha) mantras in connexion with the Prayaja Sacrifice
  - Anuvāka 3: Oblative Mantras, called Apri, to be recited by the Hota at the Prayaja sacrifice
  - Anuvāka 4: Mantras to be repeated when turning a fire round the oblation (Paryaynikarama)
  - Anuvāka 5: Exhortative (praisha) mantra to be addressed to the Hota by the slayer of the sacrifice – Samitri
  - Anuvāka 6: Exhortative (praisha) mantra to be addressed by the Hota to the slayer of the sacrifice
  - Anuvāka 7: Invocation of Agni with reference to the droppings of the oblations
  - Anuvāka 8: Puronurakya and Praisha mantras for the offering of omentum and rice cake
  - Anuvāka 9: Oblative (Yajya) mantras for the offering of omentum and rice cake
  - Anuvāka 10: Eulogistic mantras, called Manola, addressed to Agni
  - Anuvāka 11: Invocatory (Puronuvakya) and exhortative (Praisha) mantras to be recited by Maitravaruna in offering clarified butter, wood and Svishtakrita
  - Anuvāka 12: Oblative (Yajya) mantras for the offering of wood, clarified butter and the Svishtakrita
  - Anuvāka 13: Exhortative mantras to be recited in connexion with the Anuyajas
  - Anuvāka 14: Oblative mantras relating to the Anuyajas
  - Anuvāka 15: Exhortative mantra for the Suktavaka
- Prapāṭhaka 7: Expiations for defects in the performance of ceremonies
  - Anuvāka 1: Expitations in connexion with the Dars'apaurnamasa ceremony
  - Anuvāka 2: Expitations in connexion with the oblatory articles of the Agnihotra or fire sacrifice
  - Anuvāka 3: Substitutes for the sacrificial fire, etc.
  - Anuvāka 4: Mantras to be recited by the Yajamana in course of Ishti rites
  - Anuvāka 5: Mantras to be recited by the Yajamana in the Ishti rites – Continued
  - Anuvāka 6: Mantras regarding the Ishti rites not given in the two preceding sections
  - Anuvāka 7: Mantras for obviating defects in the ceremonial for the initiation of a neophyte (Dhiksha) in connexion with the Soma sacrifices
  - Anuvāka 8: Mantras for obviating accidents in regard to Sacrificial animals
  - Anuvāka 9: Mantras relating to yeast or ferment, etc.
  - Anuvāka 10: Expiatory Mantras
  - Anuvāka 11: Expiatory mantras for irregularities in connexion with the new and full moon sacrifices
  - Anuvāka 12: Mantras to be repeated by the Yajamana in sanctifying twenty-one bundles of Kus'a grass
  - Anuvāka 13: Mantras for sprinkling curds or milk mixed with honey of the frying pan at the concluding ceremony – Avabhritha
  - Anuvāka 14: Sprinkling, etc., at the Avabhritha
- Prapāṭhaka 8: On the operations of the first day of the Asvamedha sacrifice
  - Anuvāka 1: Preparations for the Asvamedha – the duties of the Yajamana
  - Anuvāka 2: The Sacred Rice
  - Anuvāka 3: Tying the horse with the rope
  - Anuvāka 4: Bathing of the Horse after pulling on the halter
  - Anuvāka 5: Water to be sprinkled on the Horse by the four principal officiating priests
  - Anuvāka 6: Repetition of mantras on the drops of water as they trickle down from the body of the horse after it has been bathed
  - Anuvāka 7: The Adhvaryu to sprinkle water from all the four sides
  - Anuvāka 8: Oblations (Homas) with reference to the conduct and colour of the horse
  - Anuvāka 9: Repeating the several epithets if the Horse over his ears, etc., and consecrating him
  - Anuvāka 10: Homa to the Vis'vadevas as a Diskha sacrifice
  - Anuvāka 11: Mantras of the Diksha Ceremony
  - Anuvāka 12: Ceremonies to be performed every day during the year that the horse roams about of his own accord
  - Anuvāka 13: Addresses to the fire named Ukha on the completion of the year
  - Anuvāka 14: Homa with boiled rice, etc., in connection with the Asramedha sacrifice
  - Anuvāka 15: Particulars regarding the aforesaid Homa
  - Anuvāka 16: Explanation of the Mantras used in the above homa
  - Anuvāka 17: Explanation of certain mantras of the 7th Kanda of the Sanhita relating to the rice homa
  - Anuvāka 18: The same subject continued
  - Anuvāka 19: On the planting of the sacrificial posts on the day preceding the first day of the Asvamedha ceremony
  - Anuvāka 20: On the places appropriate for the different sacrificial posts
  - Anuvāka 21: Peculiarities in regard to establishing of the fire in connexion with the horse sacrifice
  - Anuvāka 22: Certain details regarding the recitation of the Vahispuramana hymns
  - Anuvāka 23: How the other animals are to be arranged about the horse
- Prapāṭhaka 9: On the operations of the second and third days of the horse sacrifice
  - Anuvāka 1: How the wild and the domestic animals are dealt with
  - Anuvāka 2: The Chaturmasya and other animals
  - Anuvāka 3: Object of offering several animals to each divinity, and of mixing the fat of those animals together
  - Anuvāka 4: On yoking the horse to a car and ornamenting and anointing him
  - Anuvāka 5: On the Recitation of the Brahmodya Samvad
  - Anuvāka 6: Ceremonies performed over the slaughtered horse
  - Anuvāka 7: Ceremonies to be performed over the slaughtered horse, concluded
  - Anuvāka 8: On the merits of sacrificing animals at the As'vamedha ceremony
  - Anuvāka 9: Animals meet for the third day of the ceremony
  - Anuvāka 10: On the Grahas called Mahimana
  - Anuvāka 11: Offering homa with parts of the body of the slaughtered horse, and those called Svishtakrit
  - Anuvāka 12: The Homa called As'vastomiya, in which the fat of the horse is offered between the S'arira and the S'vishtakrit homas, and the Homa with two-footed verses
  - Anuvāka 13: Ishti ceremonies to be performed for a year before commencing the horse sacrifice
  - Anuvāka 14: Songs appropriate for the Ishtis
  - Anuvāka 15: Special homa to Mritya in connection with the Avabhritha or supplementary homa
  - Anuvāka 16: Mantra for tying the sacrificial animals to the principal post (Upakarana), and an Ishti ordained
  - Anuvāka 17: Expiations for diseases and other accidents to the horse
  - Anuvāka 18: The Brahmodana Ishti in connexion with the horse sacrifice
  - Anuvāka 19: The twelve merits of the As'vamedha
  - Anuvāka 20: The mod of sacrificing the horse
  - Anuvāka 21: Offering on the northern altar – Attara Vedi
  - Anuvāka 22: The sacrifice of a bull at the As'vamedha
  - Anuvāka 23: On the meditating on different members of the horse
- Prapāṭhaka 10: Sa'vitra-Chayana or collection of fire for the adoration of the sun
  - Anuvāka 1: Placing of bricks on the altar
  - Anuvāka 2: Placing of bricks in the name of Svayamatrinna
  - Anuvāka 3: Invitation to the Adhvaryus
  - Anuvāka 4: Invitation to the Yajamana
  - Anuvāka 5: Praise of the fire by the Hota
  - Anuvāka 6: The anointing of the face of the Yakamana with clarified butter
  - Anuvāka 7: Offerings after the anointment
  - Anuvāka 8: Offerings to Mrityu (Death)
  - Anuvāka 9: The philosophy of the Savitra Agni explained
  - Anuvāka 10: Advantages of knowing the different mantras of the Savitragni
  - Anuvāka 11: The advantages of knowing and the disadvantages of not knowing the purport of the Savitragni
- Prapāṭhaka 11: Nachiketa-Chayana, or collection of Nachiketa Fire
  - Anuvāka 1: The mantras for placing of bricks, and the mode of placing them
  - Anuvākas 2–5: Offering of oblations (homa) for the purpose [above]
  - Anuvāka 6: Mantras for touching the fire
  - Anuvāka 7: Philosophy of the Nachiketa fire
  - Anuvāka 8: Anecdote from the Katha Upanishad on the advantage of knowing and collecting the Nachiketa fire
  - Anuvāka 9: Method of collecting the Nachiketa fire
  - Anuvāka 10: Praise of the Nachiketa rite
- Prapāṭhaka 12: Cha-tur-hotra and Vaisvasrij ceremonies
  - Anuvāka 1: Divahs'yeni and Apadya rites, (Ishtis) being parts of one form of the Chatur-hotra ceremonies
  - Anuvāka 2: The Divahs'yeni rites described
  - Anuvāka 3: Invocatory and oblative mantras for the Apadya rite
  - Anuvāka 4: Anecdotes regarding the Apadya rite
  - Anuvāka 5: Chapurhotra-Chayana, or the observance of the Chaturhotra fire
  - Anuvāka 6: Visvasrij-Chayana, or Collection of the Visvasrij fire
  - Anuvāka 7: Details regarding the middle circle [bricks to be used]
  - Anuvāka 8: Mantras to be recited when placing the bricks
  - Anuvāka 9: Certain details about the same

=== The Nakshatras ===
The star Revati follows the path of the deva Pushan. He is the lord of nourishment, protector of pashu (cattle) and makes all strong with plenitude. May these havis (offered to him) be delightful to him. He completes the yajna for us indicating the many correct paths...

May [the] Revati star protect our little animals; Pusha deva protects the cows and horses.

— Taittiriya Brahmana (Volume 1), translated by R.L. Kashyap (2017), Ashtaka 3, Prapathaka 1, Anuvaka 1, Khandikas 22–23

Details are provided in the section dealing with the first ashṭaka (see above).

=== The Purushamedha ===
1. "To a (divinity of the) Brahman (cast), a Brahmana should be sacrificed (alabhate); 2. To a (divinity of the) Kshatriya (caste), a Kshatriya; 3. To the Maruts, a Vaisya; 4. To Tapa (the divinity presiding over penances), a Sudra; 5. To Tamas (the presiding divinity of darkness) a thief; 6. To Naraka (the divinity of hells) a Virana (one who blows out sacrificial fires); 7. To Papaman (the divinity of sins), a hermaphrodite (or a eunuch); 8. To Akray (the divinity of commerce), an Ayogu (one who acts against the ordinances of the Sastra); 9. To Kama (the divinity of love), a courtesan; 10. To Atikrushta (a detested divinity), a Magadha (the son of a Vaisya by a Kshatriya woman)...

— On Human Sacrifices in Ancient India by Rājendralāla Mitra (1876), Extract from the Taittirīya Brāhmaṇa (Prapāṭhaka 4), p.96

D.M. Knipe states that there 'is no inscriptional or other record that a purusua-medha [meaning 'human-sacrifice'] was ever performed, leading some scholars to suggest it was simply invented to round out sacrificial possibilities... The significance of the entire enterprise is compromised when [the] SB [Śatapatha Brāhmaṇa] 13.6.2 presents a deus ex machina, an ethereal voice that intervenes to halt the proceedings: a sacrificer always eats the victim, man would therefore eat man, not an acceptable act, ergo, no performance'. The 'human sacrifice' was thus symbolic in nature, as were animal sacrifices (e.g. symbolised by plant-based foods offered and consumed in rituals, such as rice-cake; an example is found in 1.6.2.3–4 in the Shatapatha). The verse referred to by Knipe states:

Then a voice said to him, 'Purusha, do not consummate (these human victims): if thou were to consummate them, man (purusha) would eat man.' Accordingly, as soon as fire had been carried round them, he set them free, and offered oblations to the same divinities, and thereby gratified those divinities, and, thus gratified, they, gratified him with all objects of desire.

— Satapatha Brahmana, translated by Julius Eggeling (1900), Kanda XIII, Adhyaya VI, Brahmana I, Verse 13

However, R. Mitra is less convinced, stating that neither 'Aspastambha [founder of a Shakha (school) of Yajurveda] nor Sayana [commentator on the Vedic texts] has a word to say about the human victims being Symbolical... it must be added, however, that Apastambha is very brief and obscure in his remarks, and it would be hazardous to draw a positive conclusion from the insufficient data supplied by him, particularly as the Satapatha Brāhmaṇa is positive on the subject of the human victims being let off after consecration; though the fact of the Brahmana being much later than the Taittirīya Brāhmaṇa, may justify the assumption that the practice of the Kanva [and Madhyandina] school[s] can be no guide to the followers of the Taittiriyaka'.

=== The Ashvamedha ===
Rick F. Talbott states that the 'total ceremony of the Ashvamedha [meaning 'Horse-Sacrifice'] lasted over a year with the actual rites surrounding the sacrifice of the chosen horse taking only three days. The Ashvamedha was one of three royal sacrifices in Ancient India. Performance of this great sacrifice required a victorious king, his three wives, hundreds of attendants, a swift steed with special markings, the special sacrificial grounds near a large quantity of water [and being] supplied with a myriad of ritual utensils and materials. The Horse Sacrifice also required [four] types of priests... Only the victorious king could perform the Ashvamedha [itself]... like all of the new or full moon ceremonies this rite had a special significance for the events that followed'.

== References and commentaries ==
The commentator Apastambha (circa 600-300 BCE) has not been listed or discussed in this section as it seems he did not comment on the Taittirīya Brāhmaṇa specifically, but rather on sacrificial rites in general, which are detailed in multiple Brāhmaṇas (e.g. as evidenced above, the Purushamedha is detailed in both the Shatapatha and Taittirīya Brāhmaņas). The same principle applies to the commentator Sureśvara (circa 800 CE), whose Vartika works (e.g. 'Vartika on Sariraka Brāhmaṇa', 'Vartika on Saptanna Brāhmaṇa', and 'Vartika on Udgitha Brāhmaṇa', etc.), are commentaries on specific sacrificial rites enumerated in the Brāhmaṇas, not the Brāhmaṇas themselves.

=== The Nirukta ===
Recorded by the grammarian Yaska (circa 300 BCE), the Nirukta is one of the six Smriti Vedangas ('limbs of the Vedas') concerned with correct etymology and interpretation of the Vedas. The Nirukta references and lists several Brāhmaṇas as sources, including the Taittirīya Brahmaṇa.

=== Sayana ===
The 14th-century Sanskrit scholar Sayana composed numerous commentaries on Vedic literature, including the Samhitas, Brahmanas, Aranyakas, and Upanishads. B.R. Modak states that one of those commentaries by Sayana, a member of the Taittirīya Shakha, was on the Taittirīya Brāhmaṇa, and explains that 'king Bukka [1356–1377 CE] requested his preceptor and minister Madhavacharya to write a commentary on the Vedas, so that even common people would be able to understand the meaning of the Vedic Mantras. Madhavacharya told him that his younger brother Sayana was a learned person and hence he should be entrusted with the task'.

=== Bhava Swāmī, Bhaṭṭa Bhāskara, and Rāmānḍara ===
According to Shrava, the Taittirīya Brāhmaṇa was also commented upon by:

- Bhava Swāmī (circa 700 CE or earlier)
- Kauśika Bhaṭṭa Bhāskara Miśra (preceding and referred to by Sayana [Nirukta] and Devarāja Yajvā [Nighantu])
- Rāmānḍara / Rāmāgnichitta (a manuscript of his bhāshya is not available)

== Manuscripts and translations ==
Brahmana	Sanskrit	Transliteration	English (partial)
Taittiriya	archive.org: version 1, version 2	archive.org	SAKSHI: Volume 1, Volume 2
Note: There are known issues with the SAKSHI / Kashyap translation, including grammar, typography, and mistranslations.
