= Alpheratz =

Binary star in the constellation of Andromeda

α Andromedae
- Location of Alpheratz in Andromeda (circled)

Observation data Epoch J2000.0 Equinox ICRS
- Constellation: Andromeda
- Right ascension: 00^{h} 08^{m} 23.25988^{s}
- Declination: +29° 05′ 25.5520″
- Apparent magnitude (V): 2.06 (2.22 + 4.21)

Characteristics
- U−B color index: −0.46
- B−V color index: −0.11
- R−I color index: −0.10

A
- Spectral type: B8IV-VHgMn
- B−V color index: −0.06

B
- Spectral type: A7V
- B−V color index: 0.22

Astrometry

A
Radial velocity (R_{v})	−10.6 ± 0.3 (Note: Value is for the center of mass of the system.) km/s
Proper motion (μ)	RA: 135.68 mas/yr Dec.: −162.95 mas/yr
Parallax (π)	33.62±0.35 mas
Distance	97 ± 1 ly (29.7 ± 0.3 pc)
Absolute magnitude (M_{V})	−0.193 (Note: The system's combined absolute magnitude is -0.354.)

B
Absolute magnitude (M_{V})	1.797

Orbit
Period (P)	96.69±0.06 days
Semi-major axis (a)	23.917±0.127 mas (0.7146±0.0327 AU)
Eccentricity (e)	0.526±0.013
Inclination (i)	105.8±0.17°
Longitude of the node (Ω)	104.46±0.48°
Periastron epoch (T)	MJD 47374.563 ± 0.095
Argument of periastron (ω) (secondary)	257.4 ± 0.31°

Details

A
Mass	3.63±0.201 M_{☉}
Radius	2.94 ± 0.34 (Note: Applying the Stefan–Boltzmann law with a nominal solar effective temperature of 5,772 K: $$\sqrt{\biggl(\frac{5,772}{11,950}\biggr)^4 \cdot 10^{2.2}} = 2.937\ R_\odot$$.) R_{☉}
Luminosity (bolometric)	158+41 −33 L_{☉}
Surface gravity (log g)	3.75 cgs
Temperature	11,950 K
Rotation	2.38 d
Rotational velocity (v sin i)	53 km/s
Age	60; 200+117 −74 Myr

B
Mass	1.875±0.096 M_{☉}
Radius	2.03 ± 0.23 (Note: Applying the Stefan–Boltzmann law with a nominal solar effective temperature of 5,772 K: $$\sqrt{\biggl(\frac{5,772}{7,935}\biggr)^4 \cdot 10^{1.17}} = 2.035\ R_\odot$$.) R_{☉}
Luminosity (bolometric)	14.79+3.83 −3.04 L_{☉}
Surface gravity (log g)	4.0 cgs
Temperature	7,935 K
Age	70; 447+184 −130 Myr

Other designations
- Alpheratz, Sirrah, Sirah, H 5 32A, α And, Alpha Andromedae, Alpha And, δ Pegasi, δ Peg, Delta Pegasi, Delta Peg, 21 Andromedae, 21 And, BD+28°4, FK5 1, GC 127, HD 358, HIP 677, HR 15, SAO 73765, PPM 89441, ADS 94 A, CCDM J00083+2905A, WDS 00084+2905A/Aa, LTT 10039, NLTT 346

Database references
SIMBAD	data

Alpheratz is a prominent star system in the constellation of Andromeda. Pronounced /ælˈfɪəræts/, it has the Bayer designation Alpha Andromedae, Latinised from α Andromedae, and abbreviated Alpha And or α And, respectively. Alpheratz is the brightest star in the constellation when Mirach (β Andromedae) undergoes its periodical dimming. Immediately northeast of the constellation of Pegasus, it is the upper left star of the Great Square of Pegasus. It is located at a distance of 97 light-years from Earth.

Although it appears to the naked eye as a single star with overall apparent visual magnitude +2.06, it is actually a binary system composed of two stars in close orbit. The chemical composition of the brighter of the two stars is unusual as it is a mercury-manganese star whose atmosphere contains abnormally high abundances of mercury, manganese, and other elements, including gallium and xenon. It is the brightest mercury-manganese star known.

== Nomenclature ==
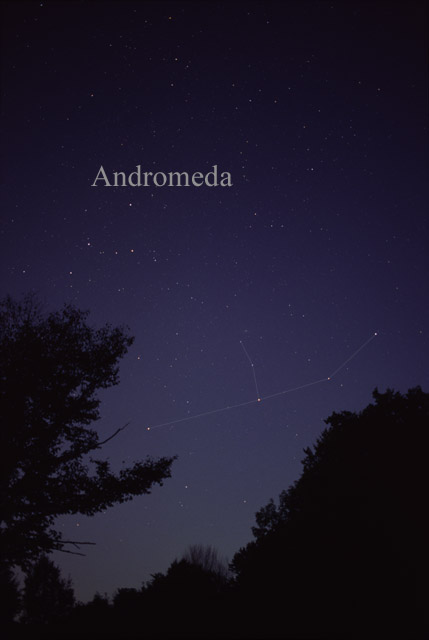
Alpha Andromedae is the brightest star in the constellation of Andromeda (right).

α Andromedae (Latinised to Alpha Andromedae) is the star's Bayer designation. Ptolemy considered the star (system) to be shared by Pegasus and Johann Bayer assigned it a designation in both constellations: Alpha Andromedae (α And) and Delta Pegasi (δ Peg). Since the IAU standardized constellation boundaries and widely published them two years after in 1930, the Pegasi alternate name has dropped from use, putting it slightly outside of that constellation.

To most European centres of learning the star bore names Alpheratz (/ælˈfiːræts/) or the cognate simplification Alpherat or the other part of the fabled description: Sirrah /ˈsɪrə/. The name has no relation with the word "alpha".

The origin of these three, the Arabic phrasal name, is سرة الفرس surrat al-faras "navel of the mare/horse", attracting a hard consonant not present above due to a following vowel. The horse corresponds equivalently to the winged horse of the Greeks, Pegasus. The star is in almost all depictions part of the main asterism of Pegasus and Andromeda. In 2016, the International Astronomical Union organized a Working Group on Star Names (WGSN) to catalog and standardize proper names for stars. The WGSN's first bulletin of July 2016 confirmed Alpheratz as the name for the main star.

Other terms for this star used by some medieval astronomers writing were راس المراة المسلسلة rās al-mar'a al-musalsala (head of the woman in chains), al-kaff al-khaḍīb and kaff al-naṣīr (palm of the faithful). The chained woman referenced Andromeda.

In the Hindu lunar zodiac, this star, together with the other stars in the Great Square of Pegasus (α, β, and γ Pegasi), makes up the nakshatras of Pūrva Bhādrapadā and Uttara Bhādrapadā.

In Chinese, 壁宿 (Bì Sù), meaning wall, refers to an asterism consisting of α Andromedae and γ Pegasi. Consequently, the Chinese name for α Andromedae itself is 壁宿二 (Bì Sù èr, English: the second star of the wall.)

It is also known as one of the "Three Guides" that mark the prime meridian of the heavens, the other two being Beta Cassiopeiae and Gamma Pegasi. It was believed to bless those born under its influence with honour and riches.

== System ==
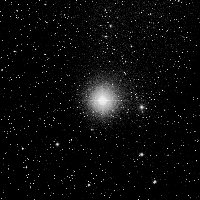
Alpheratz (field of view about 2.5°)

The radial velocity of a star away from or towards the observer can be determined by measuring the red shift or blue shift of its spectrum. The American astronomer Vesto Slipher made a series of such measurements from 1902 to 1904 and discovered that the radial velocity of α Andromedae varied periodically. He concluded that it was in orbit in a spectroscopic binary star system with a period of about 100 days. A preliminary orbit was published by Hans Ludendorff in 1907, and a more precise orbit was later published by Robert Horace Baker.

The fainter star in the system was first resolved interferometrically by Xiaopei Pan and his coworkers during 1988 and 1989, using the Mark III Stellar Interferometer at the Mount Wilson Observatory, California, United States. This work was published in 1992. Because of the difference in luminosity between the two stars, its spectral lines were not observed until the early 1990s, in observations made by Jocelyn Tomkin, Xiaopei Pan, and James K. McCarthy between 1991 and 1994 and published in 1995.

The two stars are now known to orbit each other with a period of 96.9 days. The larger, brighter star, called the primary, has a spectral type of B8IV-VHgMn, a mass of approximately 3.6 solar masses, a surface temperature of about 11,900 K (or 13,850 K), and, measured over all wavelengths, a luminosity of about 160 times the Sun's. Its smaller, fainter companion, the secondary, has a mass of approximately 1.9 solar masses and a surface temperature of about 7,900 K, and, again measured over all wavelengths, a luminosity of about 15 times the Sun's. It is a late-type A star whose spectral type is estimated as A7V.

=== Chemical peculiarities ===
In 1906, Norman Lockyer and F. E. Baxandall reported that α Andromedae had a number of unusual lines in its spectrum. In 1914, Baxandall pointed out that most of the unusual lines came from manganese, and that similar lines were present in the spectrum of μ Leporis. In 1931, W. W. Morgan identified 12 additional stars with lines from manganese appearing in their spectra. Many of these stars were subsequently identified as part of the group of mercury-manganese stars, a class of chemically peculiar stars which have an excess of elements such as mercury, manganese, phosphorus, and gallium in their atmospheres.^{, §3.4.} In the case of α Andromedae, the brighter primary star is a mercury-manganese star which, as well as the elements already mentioned, has excess xenon.

In 1970, Georges Michaud suggested that such chemically peculiar stars arose from radiative diffusion. According to this theory, in stars with unusually calm atmospheres, some elements sink under the force of gravity, while others are pushed to the surface by radiation pressure.^{, §4.} This theory has successfully explained many observed chemical peculiarities, including those of mercury-manganese stars.^{, §4.}

=== Variability of primary ===
α Andromedae has been reported to be slightly variable, but observations from 1990 to 1994 found its brightness to be constant to within less than 0.01 magnitude. However, Adelman and his co-workers have discovered, in observations made between 1993 and 1999 and published in 2002, that the mercury line in its spectrum at 398.4 nm varies as the primary rotates. This is because the distribution of mercury in its atmosphere is not uniform. Applying Doppler imaging to the observations allowed Adelman et al. to find that it was concentrated in clouds near the equator. Subsequent Doppler imaging studies, published in 2007, showed that these clouds drift slowly over the star's surface.

== Observation ==
The location of α Andromedae in the sky is shown above. It can be seen by the naked eye and is theoretically visible at all latitudes north of 60° S. During evening from August to October, it will be high in the sky as seen from the northern midlatitudes.

== Optical companion ==
ADS 94 B
Observation data Epoch J2000.0 Equinox J2000.0 (ICRS)
- Constellation: Andromeda
- Right ascension: 00^{h} 08^{m} 16.65194^{s}
- Declination: +29° 05′ 46.4518″
- Apparent magnitude (V): 10.8

Characteristics
- Evolutionary stage: subgiant
- Spectral type: G5
- B−V color index: 1.0

Astrometry
Radial velocity (R_{v})	−34.66±0.29 km/s
Proper motion (μ)	RA: 2.863 mas/yr Dec.: −14.172 mas/yr
Parallax (π)	2.4694±0.0184 mas
Distance	1,321 ± 10 ly (405 ± 3 pc)

Position (relative to A)
Epoch of observation	2000
Angular distance	89.3″
Position angle	284°

Details
Mass	1.030±0.124 M_{☉}
Radius	2.778±0.124 R_{☉}
Luminosity	7.7±0.34 L_{☉}
Surface gravity (log g)	3.5633±0.0699 cgs
Temperature	5766±100 K
Metallicity	−0.1290±0.0120
Age	3.183±0.00069 Gyr

Other designations
- H 5 32B, BD+28°4B, PPM 89439, CCDM J00083+2905B, WDS 00084+2905B

Database references
SIMBAD	data

The binary system described above has an optical visual companion, discovered by William Herschel on July 21, 1781. Designated as ADS 94 B in the Aitken Double Star Catalogue, it is a G-type star with an apparent visual magnitude of approximately 10.8. Although by coincidence it appears near to the other two stars in the sky, it is much more distant from Earth; the parallax observed by Gaia place this star more than 1,300 light years away.
