= Sarvatobhadra Chakra =

Technique in Hindu astrology

Sarvatobhadra Chakra (Sanskrit: सर्वतोभद्र) in Hindu astrology (abbrev. SBC) is a unique technique for prediction based on the Nakshatras. It is an ancient system because it takes into account Abhijit nakshatra which is now not referred to in matters pertaining to methods that are generally employed for making astrological predictions. Janardan Harji in his Mansagari has described it as - संप्रवक्ष्यामि चक्रं त्रिलोक्यदीपिकम् - the trust-worthy quickly-revealing Trilokyadeepika Chakra.The term, Sarvatobhadra, derived from Sarva (सर्व) meaning – all, and Bhadra (भद्र)) meaning – good or auspicious, means overall auspiciousness. Abhijit nakshatra is located between Uttarashada and Sravana, it is the last quarter of Uttarashada and the first half of Sravana nakshatra.

== Methodology ==
Sarvatobhadra Chakra is based on the 28 nakshatras including Abhijit nakshatra forming part of the sidereal Capricorn sign, along with the twelve Zodiac signs, the thirty Tithis, the seven days of the Week (Vara) and the fifty Aksaras or letters of Alphabet. It is used to judge the transit-effects of the Sun, the Moon, Mercury, Venus, Mars, Jupiter, Saturn, and the two Lunar nodes - Rahu and Ketu. Abhijit nakshatra is not used in fixing the benefic nakshatras. The available standard texts do not deal with the construction of this Chakra. However, in his commentary on the Chapter XXVI of Mantrewara’s Phaladeepika, Gopesh Kumar Ojha has given the required method. The main source of the Sarvatobhadra chakra method of prognostication is Brhmayamal Grantha.

Sarvatobhadra Chakra is drawn in a rectangle divided 9x9 = 81 sections and the counting is clockwise starting from the auspicious north-east corner the right-hand-top side and called the Ishana kona (also in use is SBC drawn by starting from left-hand-top side). The outer square or ring of 32 boxes depicts 28 nakshatras (7x7) with the four corners remaining allotted to four vowels, the immediately inner two rings – the aksaras i.e. vowels and consonants where the first swara or aksara of name is to be placed, the next inner ring – the signs and the inner-most - the week-days. In this manner the Chakra will cover 28 sections or vargas pertaining to the nakshatras, 12 to signs, 5 to tithis/weekdays, 16 to vowels and 20 to consonants – total 81 vargas. Its use involves the concept of Vedha. In this method the nakshatras aspect each other i.e. the nakshatra directly in opposite direction and the nakshatra which is to the left and the right. These 28 nakshatras also represent the Sapta Nadis.

Sarvatobhadra Chakra:

ई	Dhanista	Satabhisa	Poorvabhadrapada	Uttarabhadrapada	Revati	Ashwini	Bharani	अ
Sravana	ऋ	ग	स	द	च	ल	उ	Krittika
Abhijit	ख	ऐ	Aquarius	Pisces	Aries	लृ	अ	Rohini
Uttarashada	ज	Capricorn	अः	Friday	ओ	Taurus	व	Mrigasira
Poorvashada	भ	Sagittarius	Thursday	Saturday	Sunday / Tuesday	Gemini	क	Ardra
Moola	य	Scorpio	अं	Monday / Wednesday	औ	Cancer	ह	Punarvasu
Jyestha	न	ए	Libra	Virgo	Leo	लृ	ड	Pushya
Anuradhha	ऋ	त	र	प	ट	म	ऊ	Ashelesha
इ	Vishakha	Swati	Chitra	Hasta	Uttara Phalguni	Poorva Phalguni	Magha	आ

== Vedha ==
Vedha (वेध), meaning – Obstruction, is the power of a planet to influence favourably (by benefic planets) or unfavourably through obstruction (by malefic planets), the influence is stronger when the planets influenced and influencing are exalted or retrograde but weaker if they be debilitated; a favourable vedha can nullify an adverse vedha.

Mansagari tells us that one vedha results in conflict, two vedhas result in loss of wealth, three vedhas indicate defeat or failure, and four vedhas indicate death; one vedha of a papa-graha results in misunderstanding, jealousy, ill-feelings etc.; two vedhas indicate loss, three vadhas indicate illness and four vedhas indicate death. In case the Janam nakshatra suffers vedha then travel or meaningless wandering is indicated, if it suffers Akshara-vedha – loss, if it suffers Swara-vedha – illness, if it suffers Tithi–vedha – fear, if it suffers Rasi-vedha – great opposition or grave calamity, and if it simultaneously suffers from all five vedhas death is certain. The vedha caused by the Sun indicates - grief, by Mars – loss of wealth, by Saturn – pain and ailments, by Rahu and Ketu – obstructions, by the Moon – good and bad happenings, by Venus – fear from foes, by Mercury – sharpening of intellect, and by Jupiter – many good happenings and gains. At the commencement of journey or initiation of an auspicious work if the Janam nakshtra (the nakshtra occupied by the Moon at birth) suffers vedha it indicates death or failure, if Karma nakshtra (the 10th counted from Janam nakshatra) suffers vedha it indicates difficulty and suffering, if Adhana nakshtra (the 21st nakshatra counted from Janam nakshatra) suffers vedha it indicates affliction of the mind, if Vinasa nakshatra (the 23rd nakshatra counted from Janam nakshatra) suffers vedha it indicates strife with relatives and friends, if Samudayika nakshatra (the 18th nakshatra counted from Janam nakshatra) suffers vedha it indicates various difficulties, if Samghatika nakshatra (the 16th nakshatra counted from Janam nakshatra) suffers vedha it indicates losses, if Jati nakshatra suffers vedha it indicates destruction of family and if Abhijit nakshatra suffers vedha it indicates incarceration; this is with reference to the Nadis.

The planets in direct motion at normal speed possess the front-vedha (or opposite-vedha) aspect, at accelerated motion the left–vedha and in retrograde motion – the backward–vedha (relative to their normal direction of movement). The Sun and the two lunar nodes have fixed front–vedha and vedha to the right and the left.

== Application ==
Sarvatobhadra chakra is used for determining auspicious mahurata for good luck and to ensure success in undertakings and happiness. All possible queries at individual and national levels can be successfully answered using this method, which is based on astrological norms, whenever horoscope is not available and which method can also be used to verify the correctness of predictions made by using other methods.

== See also ==
- Sarvatobhadra-vyuha
