= Menkib =

Menkib can refer to the following stars (the name derives from the Arabic منكب mankib, meaning "shoulder"):

- Menkib, the proper name approved by the International Astronomical Union for the star Xi Persei, in the constellation of Perseus. (It was previously also spelt Menchib or Menkhib.)
- Mankib, traditional name for the star Beta Pegasi in the constellation of Pegasus.
- Menkab, traditional name for the star Alpha Ceti or Menkar in the constellation of Cetus.
- Markab, the proper name approved by the International Astronomical Union for the star (Alpha Pegasi), in the constellation of Pegasus.
