= Gamma Pegasi =

Variable B-type star in the constellation Pegasus

- Location of γ Pegasi (circled)

Observation data Epoch J2000 Equinox ICRS
- Constellation: Pegasus
- Right ascension: 00^{h} 13^{m} 14.15123^{s}
- Declination: +15° 11′ 00.9368″
- Apparent magnitude (V): +2.78 to 2.89

Characteristics
- Spectral type: B2 IV
- U−B color index: −0.85
- B−V color index: −0.23
- Variable type: β Cep

Astrometry
Radial velocity (R_{v})	+4.1 km/s
Proper motion (μ)	RA: +1.98 mas/yr Dec.: –9.28 mas/yr
Parallax (π)	6.9474±0.4293 mas
Distance	470 ± 30 ly (144 ± 9 pc)
Absolute magnitude (M_{V})	−2.51±0.15

Details

A
Mass	8.8±0.3 M_{☉}
Radius	5.4±0.4 R_{☉}
Luminosity	6,000+900 −800 L_{☉}
Surface gravity (log g)	3.95±0.05 cgs
Temperature	22,000±400 K
Metallicity [Fe/H]	−0.34 dex
Rotational velocity (v sin i)	8 km/s
Age	21.9+1.0 −1.4 Myr

Other designations
- Algenib, γ Pegasi, 88 Pegasi, FK5 7, HD 886, HIP 1067, HR 39, SAO 91781

Database references
SIMBAD	data

Gamma Pegasi is a binary star in the constellation of Pegasus, located at the southeast corner of the asterism known as the Great Square. It has the formal name Algenib /ælˈdʒiːnɪb/; the Bayer designation Gamma Pegasi is Latinized from γ Pegasi and abbreviated Gamma Peg or γ Peg. The average apparent visual magnitude of +2.84 makes this the fourth-brightest star in the constellation. The distance to this system has been measured using the parallax technique, yielding a value of roughly 470 light-years (144 parsecs).

== Nomenclature ==
Gamma Pegasi is the star's Bayer designation. Although it also had the traditional name Algenib, this name was also used for Alpha Persei. In 2016, the International Astronomical Union organized a Working Group on Star Names (WGSN) to catalog and standardize proper names for stars. The WGSN's first bulletin of July 2016 included a table of the first two batches of names approved by the WGSN; which included Algenib for Gamma Pegasi A (Alpha Persei was given the name Mirfak).

The asterism of γ Pegasi and α Andromedae, in Hindu astronomy, is called Uttara Bhādrapadā (उत्तरभाद्रपदा) or Uttṛṭṭāti. It is the 26th nakshatra. In Chinese, 壁宿 (Bìxiù), meaning Wall (asterism) refers to an asterism consisting of γ Pegasi and α Andromedae . Consequently, the Chinese name for γ Pegasi itself is 壁宿一 (Bìxiù yī, English: the First Star of Wall.)

== Properties ==
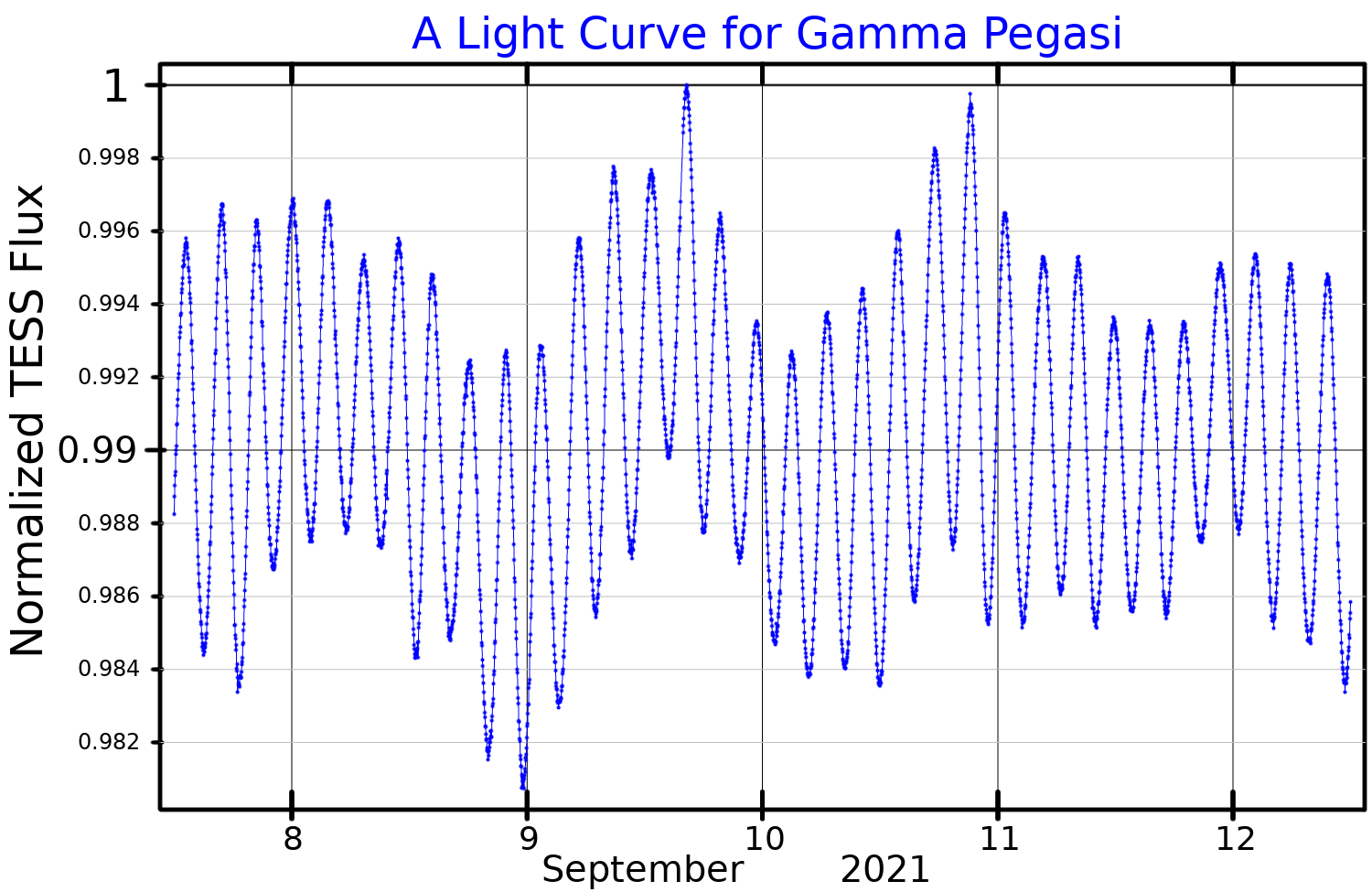
A light curve for Gamma Pegasi, plotted from TESS data

In 1911, American astronomer Keivin Burns discovered that the radial velocity of Gamma Pegasi varied slightly. This was confirmed in 1953 by American astronomer D. Harold McNamara, who identified it as a Beta Cephei variable. (At the time he actually identified it as a Beta Canis Majoris star, which was subsequently designated a Beta Cephei variable.) It pulsates radially with a period of 0.15175 days (3.642 hours), but also shows the behavior of a slowly pulsating B star (SPB) with three additional pulsational frequencies. Hence it is considered a hybrid pulsator. Its magnitude varies between +2.78 and +2.89 over the course of each pulsation cycle. In 2025, interferometric observations discovered a companion around the star.

The primary is a large star with 8.8 times the mass of the Sun and 5.5 times the Sun's radius. The stellar classification of B2 IV suggests this is a subgiant star that is exhausting the hydrogen at its core and is in the process of evolving away from the main sequence. With a projected rotational velocity of 8 km/s, it is either rotating very slowly or it is being viewed from nearly pole-on. Gamma Pegasi A has a total luminosity of 6,000 times that of the Sun, which is being radiated from its outer atmosphere at an effective temperature of more than 22,000 K. At this temperature, the star glows with a blue-white hue. Algenib has a weak magnetic field (from -10 G to 30 G, an upper bound on a dipolar magnetic field strength of about 40 G).

The secondary has an angular separation of 85.6±0.1 mas from its primary, little is known about it.

== Artemis II ==
Gamma Pegasi was captured in photographs of the totally eclipsed sun, by the moon, during the mission of Artemis II in April 2026. These photographs were made in the direction of the constellations Aries, Pegasus, and Pisces.
