= Nakshatra =

Lunar mansion in Hindu astronomy

Today (at UTC+00)
- Tuesday, 10 November 2026
- Hindu: Viśākhā・Saubhāgya; Solar: 24 Kārtika, 1948 SE; Lunisolar: Pratipada, Śukla pakṣa of Kārtika, 2083 VE; Rāudra・5127 KY・1,872,889
Other calendars
| Akan | Kurubene |
| Armenian | 23 Trē 1476 |
| Aztec | Atlcahualo 19, 6 Malīnalli |
| Babylonian | 28 Tashritu, 2337 SE |
| Balinese pawukon | Menga, Pasah, Laba, Umanis, Paniron, Anggara of Landep, Indra, Urungan, Dewa |
| Bengali | 25 Kartik, BS 1433 |
| Chinese | Yang Earth Rat・Wings Mansion; Fire Horse Year, Month 10, Day 2 (Lidong, 12 days until Xiaoxue) |
| Common Era | 10 November 2026 CE |
| Coptic | 1 Hathor, AM 1743 |
| Egyptian | 28 Phamenoth, 2775 NE |
| Ethiopian | 1 H̱edār, 2019 Amätä Məhrät |
| French Republican | Décade II, Nonidi de Brumaire de l'Année 235 de la République |
| Gregorian | 10 November, AD 2026 |
| Hebrew | 30 Cheshvan, AM 5787 |
| Icelandic | Þriðjudagur, 18 Gormánuður 2026 |
| Islamic | 29 Jumada al-awwal, AH 1448 (using tabular method) |
| ISO week date | 2026-W46-2 |
| Japanese | 2 Kannazuki, Reiwa 8 (Rittō, 12 days until Shōsetsu) |
| Julian | 28 October, AD 2026 (AM 7535) |
| Julian day | 2461355 |
| Korean | 2 Dwaejidal, 4359 DE |
| Maya | 13.0.14.1.12; 5 Ceh, 6 Eb |
| Roman | ante diem V Kalendas Novembres, MMDCCLXXIX AUC |
| Solar Hijri | 19 Aban, SH 1405 |
| Tibetan | 1 smin drug, me pho rta 2153 or 1772 or 1000 |

Nakshatra (Sanskrit: नक्षत्रम्, romanized: Nakṣatram) is the term for a lunar mansion in Hindu astrology. A nakshatra is one of the 27 (sometimes 28) sectors along the ecliptic. Their names are related to the prominent star or asterism in or near the respective sectors. Every nakshatra is divided into four padas (lit. "steps").

The starting point for the nakshatras according to the Vedas is "Krittika" (it has been argued that this is because the Pleiades may have marked the start of the year at the time the Vedas were compiled, presumably at the vernal equinox), but in more recent compilations, the start of the nakshatra list is the point on the ecliptic directly opposite the star Spica, called Chitrā in Sanskrit. This corresponds to Ashwinī, a part of the modern constellation of Aries. These compilations, therefore, may have been compiled during the centuries when the sun was passing through Aries at the time of the vernal equinox. This version may have been called Meshādi or the "start of Aries".

The first astronomical text that lists them is the Vedanga Jyotisha.

In classical Hindu scriptures like the Mahabharata (Shalya Parvan,section 35) and Harivamsa, the creation of the asterisms is attributed to Daksha. The nakshatras are personified as daughters of Daksha and as wives of Chandra, the god of the Moon. When Chandra neglected his other 26 wives in favour of Rohini, his father-in-law cursed him with leprosy and proclaimed that the Moon would wax and wane each month. The nakshatras are also described as the daughters of Kashyapa.

Nakshatra is one of the five elements of a Pañcāṅga. The other four elements are:

- Tithi
- Nityayoga
- Karana
- Vāra

== Etymology ==
The sanskrit term naksatra denotes a special class of heavenly bodies associated with the moon. The term naksatra consists of the root náks-(meaning "to attain") combined with the suffix -tra (or -l-atra, meaning "place"), meaning "the place to which the moon attains".

== History ==
Historically, nakshatra referred to stars or star-groups associated with the Moon's path. In later jyotisha, the term also came to denote 27 equal divisions of the ecliptic. In this equal division system, each nakshatra spans 13° 20'.

The Atharva veda contains a list of 28 nakshatras. Other ancient Indian scriptures like the Taittiriya Samhita (4.4.10.1-3) and the Shatapatha Brahmana (10.5.4.5) record 27 nakshatras.

=== In the Atharvaveda ===
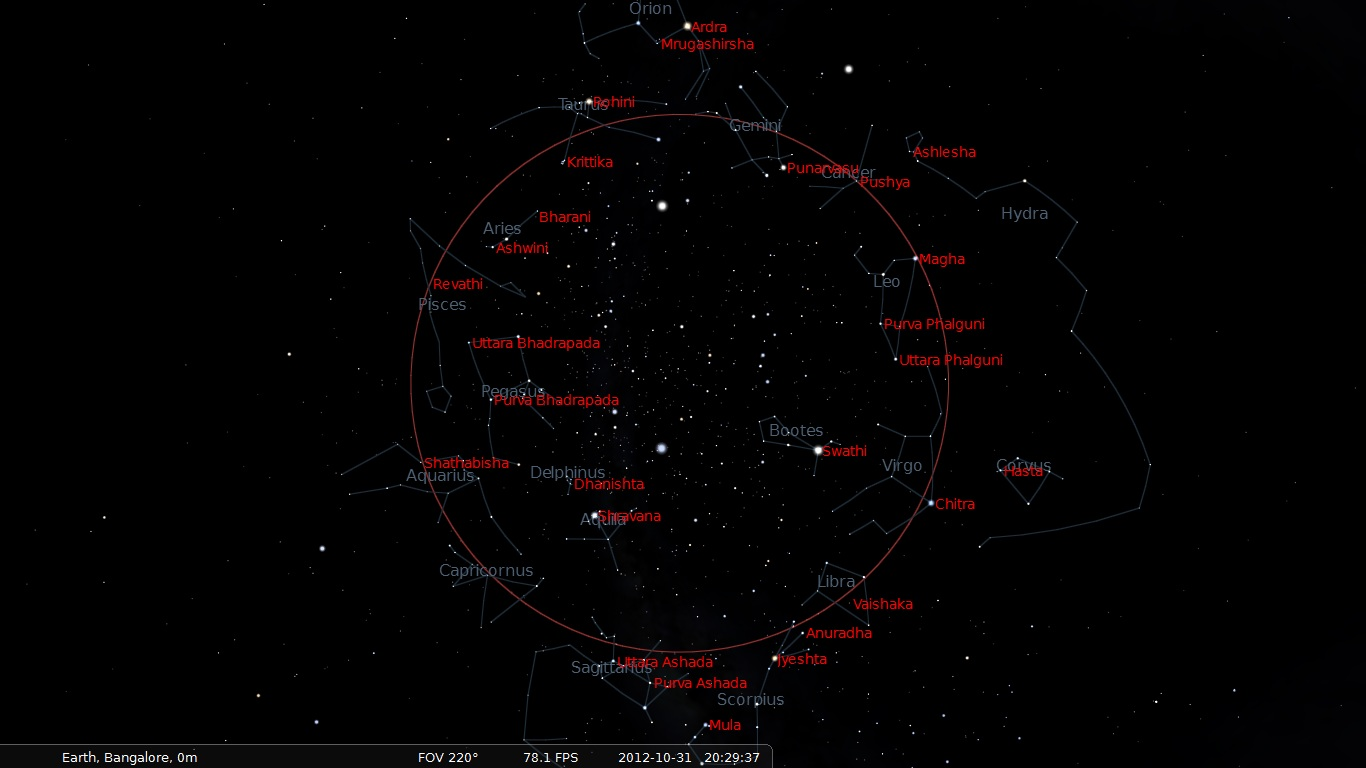
Nakshatras in a circle

In the Atharvaveda (Shaunakiya recension, hymn 19.7) a list of 27 stars or asterisms is given, many of them corresponding to the later nakshatras: (Note: From Griffith (1895) Hymns of the Atharva Veda: 1 citrā́ṇi sākáṃ diví rocanā́ni sarīsr̥pā́ṇi bhúvane javā́ni turmíśaṃ sumatím ichámāno áhāni gīrbhíḥ saparyāmi nā́kam 2 suhávam agne kŕ̥ttikā róhiṇī cā́stu bhadráṃ mr̥gáśiraḥ śám ārdrā́ púnarvasū sūnŕ̥tā cā́ru púṣyo bhānúr āśleṣā́ áyanaṃ maghā́ me 3 púṇyaṃ pū́rvā phálgunyau cā́tra hástaś citrā́ śivā́ svātí sukhó me astu rā́dhe viśā́khe suhávānurādhā́ jyéṣṭhā sunákṣatram áriṣṭa mū́lam 4 ánnaṃ pū́rvā rāsatāṃ me aṣādhā́ ū́rjaṃ devy úttarā ā́ vahantu abhijín me rāsatāṃ púṇyam evá śrávaṇaḥ śráviṣṭhāḥ kurvatāṃ supuṣṭím 5 ā́ me mahác chatábhiṣag várīya ā́ me dvayā́ próṣṭhapadā suśárma ā́ revátī cāśvayújau bhágaṃ ma ā́ me rayíṃ bháraṇya ā́ vahantu) Sakamoto-Goto identifies it as a hymn used for the daily worship of the nakshatras. The text lists 28 nakshatras, beginning with the Krttikās and including intercalary asterism Abhijit.

1. Ashwini (Sheratan and Mesarthim)
2. Bharani (41 Arietis)
3. Kṛttikā (the Pleiades)
4. Rohinī (Aldebaran)
5. Mrigashīrsha
6. Ārdrā (Betelgeuse)
7. Punarvasu (Castor and Pollux)
8. Pushya
9. Asleshā (ε Hydrae)
10. Maghā (Regulus)
11. Purva Phalguni (Zosma and Chertan)
12. Uttara Phalguni (Denebola)
13. Hasta
14. Chitrā (Spica)
15. Svāti (Arcturus)
16. Vishākhā
17. Anurādhā (Acrab, Dschubba, Fang and Iklil)
18. Jyeshthā (Antares, Alniyat, and Paikauhale)
19. Mūla
20. Purva Ashadha (Kaus Media and Kaus Australis)
21. Uttara Ashadha (Nunki and Ascella)
22. Shravana (Altair, Alshain, and Tarazed)
23. Dhanishta (γ^{1} Delphini)
24. Shatabhisha (λ Aquarii)
25. Purva Bhadrapada (Markab and Scheat)
26. Uttara Bhadrapada (Algenib and Alpheratz)
27. Revati (ζ Piscium)

This 27-day cycle has been taken to mean a particular group of stars. This has to do with the periodicity with which the Moon travels past the specific star fields called nakshatras. Hence, the stars are more like numbers on a clock, through which the hands of time (the moon) pass. This concept is described by J. Mercay (2012) in connection with Surya Siddhanta.

=== Astronomical derivation of nakshatras ===
The choice between 27 or 28 nakshatras comes down to how ancient calendars calculated the speed of the Moon. During the Bronze Age (around 2000 BCE), astronomers used a calendar of 360 days, where the sun moved 1 degree per day and the moon moved an average of 13 degrees per day. Dividing the 360-degree sky by the Moon's 13 degree daily path gives an orbital period of 27.69 days .The astronomers rounded it to 28 nakshatras. Later, when a 365 day solar calendar was adopted, the Moon's updated daily speed of 13.2 degrees resulted in a shorter orbit of 27.27 days. Astronomers then rounded this down to 27 nakshatras and dropped the star Abhijit.

=== Vedic Calendar ===
The Vedic calendar was based on a 360-day solar year composed of twelve 30- day months. Its earliest mention is found in the Rigveda texts. It arose from a ritual need to identify the exact nights of the new moon (amāvāsyā) and full moon (puranmāsī) for sacred sacrifices, which were otherwise difficult to determine by naked eye observation.

The priests tracked the Moon's night-by-night movement against the fixed stars, establishing a system of 28 nakshatras(lunar stations) representing the 28 nights the moon was visible during a synodic month. Early astronomers derived the name of each month directly from the specific nakshatra in which the full moon shone during that month.

=== Vedic origin of tithi ===
The tithi is a lunar day in the Hindu calendar. In the 360-day vedic calendar, the Moon travelled an average of 13 degrees per day, while the Sun travelled 1 degree per day. As a result, the Moon separated from the Sun by 12 degrees (13 minus 1) every 24 hours. This time that the moon takes to pull 12 degrees ahead of the Sun, is called a tithi.

== List of Nakshatras ==
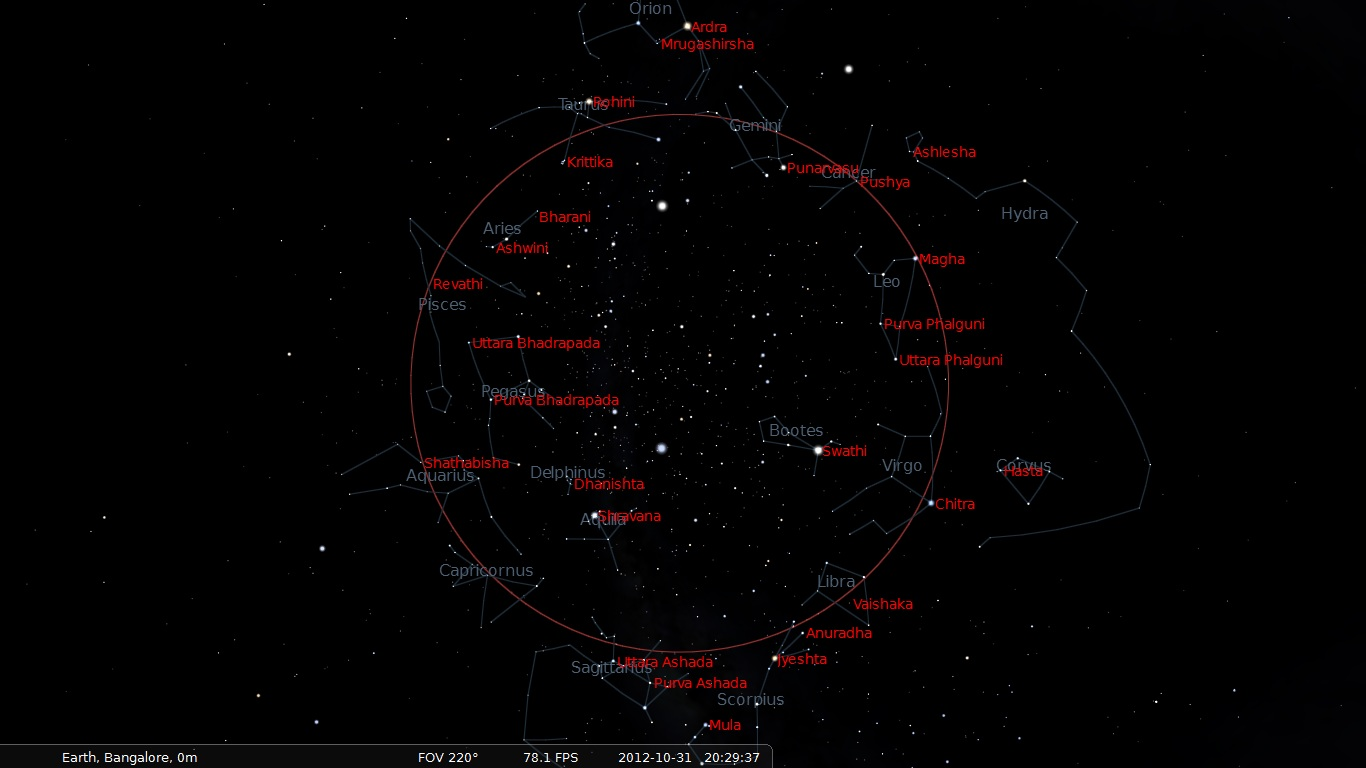
Positions of the Nakshatras on the celestial sphere

In Hindu astronomy, there was an older tradition of 28 nakshatras which were used as celestial markers. When these were mapped into equal divisions of the ecliptic, a division of 27 portions was adopted since that resulted in a clearer definition of each segment, subtending 13° 20′ rather than the 12° 51 3/7′ that 28 segments would give. In the process, the nakshatra Abhijit was left out without a portion. However, the Abhijit nakshatra becomes important when deciding on the timing of an auspicious event. The Surya Siddhantha concisely specifies the coordinates of the 27 nakshatras.

It is noted above that with the older tradition of 28 nakshatras each equal segment would subtend 12.85 degrees or 12° 51′. But the 28 nakshatra were chosen at a time when the Vedic month was recognised as having exactly 30 days. In India and China the original 28 lunar mansions were not equal. Weixing Nui provides a list of the extent of the original 28 nakshatras expressed in Muhurtas (with one Muhurta = 48 minutes of arc). Hindu texts note there were 16 nakshatras of 30 Muhurtas, 6 of 45 Muhurtas, 5 of 15 Muhurtas and one of 6 Muhurtas.

The 28 mansions of the 360° lunar zodiac total 831 Muhurtas or 27.7 days. This is sometimes described as an inaccurate estimate of our modern sidereal period of 27.3 days, but using the ancient Indian calendar with Vedic months of 30 days and a daily movement of the Moon of 13 degrees, this early designation of a sidereal month of 831 Muhurtas or 27.7 days is very precise. (Note: The exact figure should be nearer 27.692308 days but 27.7 is near enough.) Later some Indian savants dropped the nakshatra named Abhijit to reduce the number of divisions to 27, but the Chinese retained all of their original 28 lunar mansions. These were grouped into four equal quarters which would have been fundamentally disrupted if it had been decided to reduce the number of divisions to 27.

Irrespective of why early Indian astronomers followed a Vedic calendar of exactly 12 months of 30 days it was this calendar and not a modern calendar of 365 days that they used for the astronomical calculations for the number of days taken for the Moon to complete one sidereal cycle of 360°. This is why initially they named 28 nakshatras on their lunar zodiac.

Each of the 27 nakshatras, starting with Ashvini and ending with Revati, has its own symbol, an associated mythological deity, and a planetary ruler (navagraha).The following list of nakshatras gives the corresponding regions of sky, as per Basham (1954).

| No. | Name | Associated stars | Description | Image |
|---|---|---|---|---|
| 1 | Aśvinī "The Horsemen" | β and γ Arietis | Astrological leader: Ketu (South lunar node); Symbol: Horse's head; Deity: Ashvins, the horse-headed twins who are physicians to the gods; Indian zodiac: 0° – 13°20′ Aries; Tropical zodiac: 26° Aries – 9°20′ Taurus | |
| 2 | Bharaṇī "The Bearer" | 35, 39, and 41 Arietis | Astrological leader: Shukra (Venus); Symbol: Yoni, the female organ of reproduction; Deity: Yama, god of death and Dharma; Indian zodiac: 13° 20′ – 26°40′ Aries; Tropical zodiac: 9° 20′ – 22° 40′ Taurus | |
| 3 | Kṛttikā "To Cut" | Pleiades | Astrological leader: Surya (Sun); Symbol: Knife or spear; Deity: Agni, god of fire; Indian zodiac: 26°40′ Aries – 10° Taurus; Tropical zodiac: 22° 40′ Taurus – 6° Gemini | |
| 4 | Rohiṇi "Radiant Maiden" | Aldebaran | Astrological leader: Chandra (Moon); Symbol: Cart or chariot, temple, banyan tree; Deity: Prajapati, rigvedic form of Brahma - the Creator; Indian zodiac: 10° – 23°20′ Taurus; Tropical zodiac: 6° – 19°20′ Gemini | |
| 5 | Mṛgaśiras "The Deer's Head" | λ, φ Orionis | Astrological leader: Mangala (Mars); Symbol: Deer's head; Deity: Soma, the moon god; Indian zodiac: 23° 20′ Taurus – 6° 40′ Gemini; Tropical zodiac: 19° 20′ Gemini – 2° 40′ Cancer | |
| 6 | Ārdrā "The Moist One" | Betelgeuse | Astrological leader: Rahu (North lunar node); Symbol: Teardrop, diamond, a human head; Deity: Rudra, rigvedic fierce form of Shiva; Indian zodiac: 6° 40′ – 20° Gemini; Tropical zodiac: 2° 40′ – 16° Cancer | |
| 7 | Punarvasu "Return Of The Light" | Castor and Pollux | Astrological leader: Guru (Jupiter); Symbol : Bow and quiver; Deity: Aditi, goddess representing the infinity and the mother of Adityas; Indian zodiac: 20° Gemini – 3°20′ Cancer; Tropical zodiac: 16° – 29°20′ Cancer | |
| 8 | Puṣya "The Nourisher" | γ, δ and θ Cancri | Astrological leader: Shani (Saturn); Symbol: Cow's udder, lotus, arrow and circle; Deity: Bṛhaspati, counsellor of the gods; Indian zodiac: 3° 20′ – 16° 40′ Cancer; Tropical zodiac: 29° 20′ Cancer – 12° 40′ Leo | |
| 9 | Āśleṣā "The Embrace" | δ, ε, η, ρ, and σ Hydrae | Astrological leader: Budha (Mercury); Symbol: Serpent; Deity: Nagas, divine race of half-human, half-serpent beings that reside in the Patala; Indian zodiac: 16° 40′ – 30° Cancer; Tropical zodiac: 12° 40′ – 26° Leo | |
| 10 | Maghā "The Mighty" | Regulus | Astrological leader: Ketu (South lunar node); Symbol: Royal Throne; Deity: Pitrs, 'The Fathers', family ancestors; Indian zodiac: 0° – 13° 20′ Leo; Tropical zodiac: 26° Leo – 9° 20′ Virgo | |
| 11 | Pūrvaphalgunī "The Former Reddish One" | δ and θ Leonis | Astrological leader: Shukra (Venus); Symbol: Front legs of bed, hammock, fig tree; Deity: Bhaga, god of marital bliss and prosperity. NOTE: Ancient texts interchange the deities of the Phalguni nakshatras. In some, such as Taittiriya Brahmana, Aryaman rules Purva Phalgunī.; Indian zodiac: 13° 20′ – 26°40′ Leo; Tropical zodiac: 9° 20′ – 22°40′ Virgo | |
| 12 | Uttaraphalgunī "The Latter Reddish One" | Denebola | Astrological leader: Surya (Sun); Symbol: Four legs of bed, hammock; Deity: Aryaman, god of patronage and favours. NOTE: Ancient texts interchange the deities of the Phalguni nakshatras. In some, such as Taittiriya Brahmana, Bhaga rules Uttara Phalgunī.; Indian zodiac: 26° 40′ Leo - 10° Virgo; Tropical zodiac: 22° 40′ Virgo – 6° Libra | |
| 13 | Hasta "The Hand" | α, β, γ, δ and ε Corvi | Astrological leader: Chandra (Moon); Symbol: Hand or fist; Deity: Savitr, the sun god; Indian zodiac: 10° – 23° 20′ Virgo; Tropical zodiac: 6° – 19° 20′ Libra | |
| 14 | Citrā "The Bright One" | Spica | Astrological leader: Mangala (Mars); Symbol: Bright jewel or pearl; Deity: Tvastar/Vishwakarma, artisan god; Indian zodiac: 23° 20′ Virgo – 6° 40′ Libra; Tropical zodiac: 19° 20′ Libra – 2° 40′ Scorpio | |
| 15 | Svātī "The Independent One" | Arcturus | Astrological leader: Rahu (North lunar node); Symbol: Shoot of plant, coral; Deity: Vayu, the wind god; Indian zodiac: 6° 40′ – 20° Libra; Tropical zodiac: 2° 40′ – 16° Scorpio | |
| 16 | Viśākhā "Branching Out" | α, β, γ and ι Librae | Astrological leader: Guru (Jupiter); Symbol: Triumphal arch, potter's wheel; Deity: Indra, king of the devas and god of thunder, storms, and lightning, and Agni, god of Fire - representing the duality of water and fire; Indian zodiac: 20° Libra – 3° 20′ Scorpio; Tropical zodiac: 16° – 29° 20′ Scorpio | |
| 17 | Anurādhā "Following Radha" | β, δ and π Scorpii | Astrological leader: Shani (Saturn); Symbol: Triumphal archway, lotus, bamboo; Deity: Mitra, one of Adityas of friendship and partnership; Indian zodiac: 3° 20′ – 16° 40′ Scorpio; Tropical zodiac: 29° 20′ Scorpio – 12° 40′ Sagittarius | |
| 18 | Jyeṣṭhā "The Eldest" | α, σ, and τ Scorpii | Astrological leader: Budha (Mercury); Symbol: circular amulet, umbrella, earring; Deity: Indra, king of the devas; Indian zodiac: 16° 40′ – 30° Scorpio; Tropical zodiac: 12° 40′ – 26° Sagittarius | |
| 19 | Mūla "The Root" | ε, ζ, η, θ, ι, κ, λ, μ and ν Scorpii | Astrological leader: Ketu (South lunar node); Symbol: Bunch of roots tied together, elephant goad; Deity: Nirrti, goddess personifying death, decay, sorrow, as well as the peak of material achievement and the beginning of the spiritual impulse; Indian zodiac: 0° – 13° 20′ Sagittarius; Tropical zodiac: 26° Sagittarius – 9° 20′ Capricorn | |
| 20 | Pūrvāṣāḍha "The Former Unconquered" | δ and ε Sagittarii | Astrological leader: Shukra (Venus); Symbol: Elephant tusk, fan, winnowing basket; Deity: Apah, god of Water; Indian zodiac: 13° 20′ – 26° 40′ Sagittarius; Tropical zodiac: 9° 20′ – 22° 40′ Capricorn | |
| 21 | Uttarāṣāḍha "The Latter Unconquered" | ζ and σ Sagittarii | Astrological leader: Surya (Sun); Symbol: Elephant tusk, small bed; Deity: Visvedevas, the most comprehensive gathering of the gods, a classification in which no deity is stated to be omitted; Indian zodiac: 26° 40′ Sagittarius– 10° Capricorn; Tropical zodiac: 22° 40′ Capricorn – 6° Aquarius | |
| * (Note: Abhijit is the 22nd lunar mansion in the Indian system of 28 nakshatras. According to traditional beliefs, it is not necessarily a separate nakshatra per se, but rather a division within the sidereal Capricorn sign, spanning from the fourth pada of Uttara Ashadha to the first pada of Shravana.) | Abhijit "The Invincible" | α and σ Lyrae | Astrological leader and Deity: Brahma; Indian zodiac: 6° 40′ – 10° 53′ Capricorn; Tropical zodiac: 2° 40′ – 6° 53′ Aquarius | |
| 22 | Śravaṇa "To Hear" | α, β and γ Aquilae | Astrological leader: Chandra (Moon); Symbol: Ear or Three Footprints; Deity: Vishnu, preserver of universe; Indian zodiac: 10° – 23° 20′ Capricorn; Tropical zodiac: 6° – 19° 20′ Aquarius | |
| 23 | Dhaniṣṭhā "Wealthiest" | α, β, γ and δ Delphini | Astrological leader: Mangala (Mars); Symbol: Drum or flute; Deity: Vasus, group of eight deities associated with fire and light signifying earthly abundance; Indian zodiac: 23° 20′ Capricorn – 6° 40′ Aquarius; Tropical zodiac: 19° 20′ Aquarius – 2° 40′ Pisces | |
| 24 | Śatabhiṣaj "A Hundred Physicians" | λ Aquarii | Astrological leader: Rahu (North lunar node); Symbol: Empty circle, 1,000 flowers or stars; Deity: Varuna, god of celestial waters; Indian zodiac: 6° 40′ – 20° Aquarius; Tropical zodiac: 2° 40′ – 16° Pisces | |
| 25 | Pūrvabhādrapada "The Former Blessed Feet" | α and β Pegasi | Astrological leader: Guru (Jupiter); Symbol: Swords or two front legs of funeral cot, man with two faces; Deity: Ajaikapada, one-footed aspect of Shiva; Indian zodiac: 20° Aquarius – 3° 20′ Pisces; Tropical zodiac: 16° – 29° 20′ Pisces | |
| 26 | Uttarabhādrapada "The Latter Blessed Feet" | γ Pegasi and α Andromedae | Astrological leader: Shani (Saturn); Symbol: Twins, back legs of funeral cot, snake in the water; Deity: Ahirbudhnya, serpent or dragon of the deep; Indian zodiac: 3° 20′ – 16° 40′ Pisces; Tropical zodiac: 29° 20′ Pisces – 12° 40′ Aries | |
| 27 | Revatī "Prosperous" | ζ Piscium | Astrological leader: Budha (Mercury); Symbol: Fish or a pair of fish, drum; Deity: Pushan, nourisher, and the psychopomp deity; Indian zodiac: 16° 40′ – 30° Pisces; Tropical zodiac: 12° 40′ – 26° Aries | |

== Padas (quarters) ==
Each of the 27 nakshatras covers 13° 20’ of the ecliptic. Each nakshatra is also divided into quarters or padas of 3° 20’, and the table below lists the syllables traditionally used as the first sound of the name given to a child born under each pada. The 27 nakshatras, each with 4 padas, gives 108. 108 is also the number of beads in a japa mala, representing all the elements (ansh) of Vishnu:

| # | Name | Pada 1 | Pada 2 | Pada 3 | Pada 4 | Vimsottari Lord | Ruling Deity |
|---|---|---|---|---|---|---|---|
| 1 | Aśvini (अश्विनी) | चु Chu | चे Che | चो Cho | ला La | Ketu | Aswini Kumara |
| 2 | Bharaṇī (भरणी) | ली Li | लू Lu | ले Le | लो Lo | Venus | Yama |
| 3 | Kṛttikā (कृत्तिका) | अ A | ई I | उ U | ए E | Sun | Agni |
| 4 | Rohiṇī (रोहिणी) | ओ O | वा Va/Ba | वी Vi/Bi | वु Vu/Bu | Moon | Brahma |
| 5 | Mṛgaśīrṣā (मृगशीर्षा) | वे Ve/Be | वो Vo/Bo | का Ka | की Ke | Mars | Moon |
| 6 | Ārdrā (आर्द्रा) | कु Ku | घ Gha | ङ Ng/Na | छ Chha | Rahu | Shiva |
| 7 | Punarvasu (पुनर्वसु) | के Ke | को Ko | हा Ha | ही Hi | Jupiter | Aditi |
| 8 | Puṣya (पुष्य) | हु Hu | हे He | हो Ho | ड Da | Saturn | Brihaspati |
| 9 | Āśleṣā (आश्लेषा) | डी Di | डू Du | डे De | डो Do | Mercury | Rahu |
| 10 | Maghā (मघा) | मा Ma | मी Mi | मू Mu | मे Me | Ketu | Pitr |
| 11 | Pūrva or Pūrva Phālgunī (पूर्व फाल्गुनी) | नो No | टा Ta | टी Ti | टू Tu | Venus | Bhaga |
| 12 | Uttara or Uttara Phālgunī (उत्तर फाल्गुनी) | टे Te | टो To | पा Pa | पी Pi | Sun | Sun |
| 13 | Hasta (हस्त) | पू Pu | ष Sha | ण Na | ठ Tha | Moon | Savitr |
| 14 | Chitrā (चित्रा) | पे Pe | पो Po | रा Ra | री Ri | Mars | Vishwakarma |
| 15 | Svāti (स्वाति) | रू Ru | रे Re | रो Ro | ता Ta | Rahu | Vayu |
| 16 | Vishākhā (विशाखा) | ती Ti | तू Tu | ते Te | तो To | Jupiter | Indra Agni |
| 17 | Anurādhā (अनुराधा) | ना Na | नी Ni | नू Nu | ने Ne | Saturn | Mitra |
| 18 | Jyeṣṭhā (ज्येष्ठा) | नो No | या Ya | यी Yi | यू Yu | Mercury | Indra |
| 19 | Mūla (मूल) | ये Ye | यो Yo | भा Bha | भी Bhi | Ketu | Varuna, Nirriti |
| 20 | Pūrva Aṣāḍhā (पूर्वाषाढ़ा) | भू Bhu | धा Dha | फा Bha/Pha | ढा Dha | Venus | Apah |
| 21 | Uttara Aṣāḍhā (उत्तराषाढ़ा) | भे Bhe | भो Bho | जा Ja | जी Ji | Sun | Visvedevas |
| 22 | Śrāvaṇa (श्रवण) | खी Ju/Khi | खू Je/Khu | खे Jo/Khe | खो Gha/Kho | Moon | Vishnu |
| 23 | Śrāviṣṭhā (श्रविष्ठा) or Dhaniṣṭhā (धनिष्ठा) | गा Ga | गी Gi | गु Gu | गे Ge | Mars | Vasus |
| 24 | Śatabhiṣā (शतभिषा) | गो Go | सा Sa | सी Si | सू Su | Rahu | Varuna |
| 25 | Pūrva Bhādrapadā (पूर्वभाद्रपदा) | से Se | सो So | दा Da | दी Di | Jupiter | Aja Ek Pada |
| 26 | Uttara Bhādrapadā (उत्तरभाद्रपदा) | दू Du | थ Tha | झ Jha | त्र Da/Tra | Saturn | Ahirbudhnya |
| 27 | Revati (रेवती) | दे De | दो Do | च Cha | ची Chi | Mercury | Pooshan |

== Astrological Significance ==
In Hindu astrology, nakshatras play an important role. Finding a person's nakshatra requires mathematical calculations using the exact time, date and coordinates of their birth. Astrologers use both the nakshatras and rashis(zodiac signs) to analyze a person's character, physical health, marriage prospects, career path etc. Checking these signs for marriage compatibility is a common Hindu tradition.

== See also ==
- Astronomical basis of the Hindu calendar
- List of Natchathara temples
- Navagraha
- Panchangam
- Asterism
