= Mark III Stellar Interferometer =

The Mark III Stellar Interferometer was a long-baseline optical astronomical interferometer, located at the Mount Wilson Observatory, California, United States. It had a maximum baseline of 32 meters and operated in wavelengths between 450 and 800 nm. A joint venture between the United States Naval Observatory, the Naval Research Laboratory, the Smithsonian Astrophysical Observatory, and the Massachusetts Institute of Technology, it began operation in 1987 and was closed in 1992. The Naval Observatory later constructed a larger interferometer, the Navy Prototype Optical Interferometer.

The Mark III interferometer was used to resolve a number of spectroscopic binary systems, including Alpha Andromedae, Phi Cygni, and many others.
