= Abhijit (nakshatra) =

Intercalary 28th nakshatra; the nakshatra patronised by Krishna in the Bhagavata Purana

Abhijit (Hindi: अभिजित) is a unique nakshatra and the 22nd nakshatra in the Indian system of 28 nakshatras, out of which 27 are traditional nakshatras and this one is an intercalary nakshatra. It is a division located in the sidereal Capricorn (corresponding to the early portion of tropical Aquarius), spanning from the fourth pada of Uttara Ashadha to the first pada of Shravana. Abhijit is the Sanskrit name for Vega, the brightest star in the northern constellation of Lyra. The name Abhijit means "the victorious one" in Sanskrit.

== History ==
In the Bhagavata Purana, Vishnu, in the incarnation of Krishna, tells Uddhava that among the nakshatras, he is Abhijit, highlighting the auspiciousness of this nakshatra.

Abhijit's longitude spans from 06° 40' to 10° 53' 20" in the constellation of Capricornus, covering the last quarter of Uttara Ashadha to the first quarter of Shravana. As a result, the Abhijit nakshatra is not a regular nakshatra with four padas but rather a intercalary nakshatra. It is not as frequently mentioned as other asterisms in Hindu mythology.

Chandra, the moon god, has 27 wives who are the 27 nakshatra goddesses, with whom he stays for one day in a sidereal lunar month. Each of the 27 asterisms is feminine and they are sisters, with Abhijit being the only masculine Nakshatra and their brother as 1 nakshatra god. The Abhijit nakshatra is considered an auspicious nakshatra in the Hindu calendar.

== See also ==
- List of Nakshatras
