= Purva Bhadrapada =

25th lunar mansion in Hindu astronomy

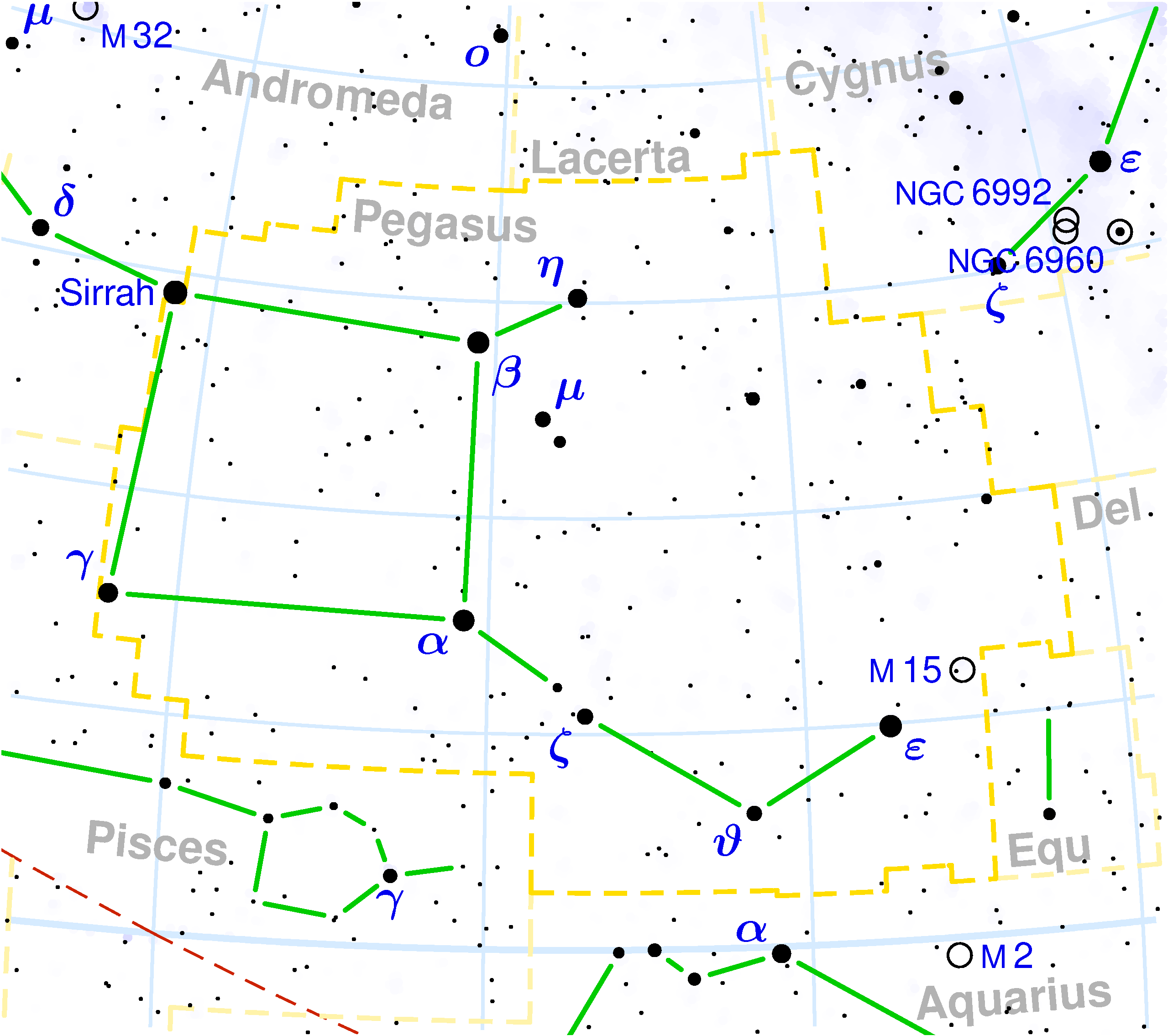
Pegasus map showing Pūrva Bhādrapadā

Pūrva Bhādrapadā (lit. "the early blessed one", "highly intuitive"), also known as Pūrațțāti (பூரட்டாதி) in Tamil and Pūrūruțțāti (പൂരൂരുട്ടാതി) in Malayalam, is the twenty-fifth of the 27 Nakshatra (constellations) in Indian astronomy and Hindu astrology, corresponding to α and β Pegasi. It is placed under the domain of Bṛhaspati, the deity represented by the planet Jupiter. Practitioners of electional astrology see Pūrva Bhādrapadā as a Cruel sign, meaning that activities related to deception, craftiness or wickedness are best begin while this sign is in prominence.

Like its twin, Uttara Bhādrapadā, Pūrva Bhādrapadā is often represented by dualistic imagery, such as a two-headed man, or two legs of a bed. Crossed swords can also be used to symbolize this nakshatra. Its patron deity is the Ajaiekapada, one-footed aspect of Shiva. The animal associated with this nakshatra in terms of yoni is a male lion.

The Ascendant/Lagna in Pūrva Bhādrapadā indicates a person who is passionate and transformational, but a little extreme and indulgent. They are idealists and non-conformists and are good influencers of others and speakers and orators, but they can also be fearful, nervous, cynical and eccentric.

It is thought that people born under this nakshatra make others obsessed over them and wanted to be like them.

It is the birth star of famous personalities like Martin Luther King, Shri Ramakrishna Paramhamsa, and Michael Jackson.

== Astrological significance ==
In Hindu astrology, Purva Bhadrapada is ruled by Jupiter (Guru) or Brihaspati and symbolized by a sword or a two-faced man, representing transformation, intensity, and duality. Its presiding deity is Aja Ekapada, a mystical one-footed serpent or goat-headed deity linked with storms and spiritual purification. This nakshatra is associated with idealism, eccentricity, and the ability to inspire profound change.
