= Girtab =

Girtab (𒄈𒋰) is a Sumerian/Akkadian word for scorpion, and an ancient Mesopotamian constellation corresponding to modern Scorpius.

It has been used as a name for several individual stars in Scorpius by different sources:

- θ Scorpii (Sargas)
- ι^{1} Scorpii
- κ Scorpii

== See also ==
- Girtablilu
