= Gienah =

Gienah was the traditional name of two stars, each marking a wing (Arabic al janāħ) of its constellation:

- Gamma Corvi a.k.a. Gienah Corvi, in Corvus
- Epsilon Cygni a.k.a. Gienah Cygni, in Cygnus

The International Astronomical Union approved the name Gienah for Gamma Corvi A in 2016 and Aljanah for Epsilon Cygni Aa in 2017.
