= Pūrva Phalgunī =

Pūrva Phalgunī (Sanskrit: पूर्व फाल्गुनी) is the eleventh nakshatra (a lunar mansion) in Hindu astrology. It spans from 13°20′ to 26°40′ of Leo in the sidereal zodiac and is followed by Uttara Phalgunī.

The nakshatra is traditionally associated with themes of 'rest, enjoyment, creativity, and relationships', and is linked with prosperity and renewal in classical astrological texts.

== Etymology ==
The name Phalgunī is derived from the Sanskrit word Phalguna, meaning reddish or fruitful, and is associated with the Phalguna month in the Hindu calendar. The term Pūrva means former or earlier, distinguishing it from Uttara Phalgunī (“later Phalgunī”).

== Astronomical associations ==
In Indian astronomy, Pūrva Phalgunī is traditionally linked with stars in the constellation of Leo, commonly associated with Delta Leonis (Zosma). Like other nakshatras, its boundaries are defined by equal divisions of the ecliptic rather than modern constellation borders.

== Deity and symbolism ==
The presiding deity of Pūrva Phalgunī is Bhaga, an Aditya associated with 'fortune, marital happiness, and prosperity'.

The nakshatra's primary symbol is the 'front legs of a bed or a hammock', representing 'rest, relaxation, and enjoyment'.

== Astrological characteristics ==
In traditional Hindu astrology:

- Ruling planet: Venus (Shukra)
- Guna: Rajas
- Caste: Brahmin (in classical classifications)
- Element: Fire (through its association with Leo)

Classical sources describe Pūrva Phalgunī as favorable for activities related to marriage, artistic pursuits, celebrations, and social harmony.

== Pada divisions ==
Pūrva Phalgunī is divided into four padas, each spanning 3°20′ of the ecliptic. These subdivisions are used in natal chart interpretation in traditional astrological systems.

== Cultural significance ==
References to the Phalgunī nakshatras appear in Vedic literature, Brahmanas, and later astrological treatises such as the Bṛhat Saṃhitā. The nakshatra system remains in use in Hindu calendars and ritual timing.

== Notes ==
This article describes traditional classifications within Hindu astrology and does not represent empirical astronomical or scientific claims.
