= Keivin Burns =

American astrophysicist and professor

- Born: 1 March 1881
- Died: 30 April 1958 (aged 77)
- Awards: Fellow, American Physical Society
- Scientific career
- Fields: Astrophysics
- Thesis: A Photographic Study of the Region of the Great Nebula in Orion
- Doctoral advisor: Francis P. Leavenworth

Keivin Burns (1881–1958) was an astronomer who pioneered the field of spectroscopy at Allegheny Observatory of the University of Pittsburgh. He was an American Physical Society Fellow.

== Personal life and education ==
Keivin Burns was born in 1881 in Pleasant Ridge, New Brunswick, Canada. He graduated from Brainerd High School in Minnesota in 1897.

Burns earned both his B.S. degree and his Ph.D. at the University of Minnesota. Burns' 1910 dissertation, A Photographic Study of the Region of the Great Nebula in Orion, was advised by Francis P. Leavenworth, Professor of Astronomy and head of the University of Minnesota observatory.

Burns married Ruth Buchanan of Pittsburgh in October 1926. They had three sons: Kevin, John, and George.

== Career ==
Burns worked as an assistant at Lick Observatory from 1904–1907, University of Minnesota faculty from 1907 to 1910, and Lick Observatory again from 1910–1918. He was an assistant physicist at the National Bureau of Standards in Washington, D.C., from 1913–1917. Burns then studied in Europe prior to joining the University of Pittsburgh staff in 1920. His association with Allegheny Observatory also began in 1920.

Burs served as treasurer of the American Astronomical Society from 1941 to 1947. The inventor of the "Burns slide rule," he also began serving on the International Astronomical Society's wave length committee in 1913. Burns was honored in 1951 for his pioneering work studying the sun's infrared spectrum, identifying 57 elements, including helium.

== Selected publications ==
- Burns, Keivin; Adams, Kenneth B.; Longwell, Jean (1950-06-01). "Interference Measurements in the Spectra of Neon and Natural Mercury". Journal of the Optical Society of America. 40 (6): 339. doi:10.1364/JOSA.40.000339. ISSN 0030-3941.
- Burns, Keivin; Adams, Kenneth B. (1956-02-01). "Energy Levels and Wavelengths of Natural Cadmium and of Cadmium-114". Journal of the Optical Society of America. 46 (2): 94. doi:10.1364/JOSA.46.000094. ISSN 0030-3941.
- Burns, Keivin. "Atmospheric dispersion-Thaw photographic refractor." Astronomical Journal, vol. 50, iss. 1143, p. 49-51 (1942). 50 (1942): 49-51.
- Burns, Keivin (1930-04-01). "A Comparison of Laboratory and Solar Wave Lengths*". Journal of the Optical Society of America. 20 (4): 212. doi:10.1364/JOSA.20.000212. ISSN 0030-3941.
- Burns, Keivin. "Orbit of the spectroscopic binary lambda Andromedae." Astrophysical Journal, 24, 345-350 (1906) 24 (1906).
- Burns, Keivin. "The arc spectrum of iron." Lick Observatory bulletins; no. 247, Berkeley: University of California Press,[1913], p. 27-42; 30 cm. 8 (1913): 27-42.

== Awards, honors ==
- Fellow of the American Physical Society, 1921/
- Honored for his pioneering work in spectroscopy by the Pittsburgh Conference on Analytical Chemistry and Applied Spectroscopy, 1951.
- Burns was honored for "outstanding work in the field of education and science," with an honorary degree of Doctor of Science from St. Bonaventure College. The award mentioned his expertise in spectrochemical analysis, as well as his work measuring wavelengths that determined stellar velocities and distances. A pioneer in infrared photography with expertise in aerial photography, he worked in England during World War II as an accredited agent of the U. S.1947. He also introduced photographic methods of military value in France.
