= Alpha Pegasi =

Star in the constellation Pegasus

α Pegasi
- Location of α Pegasi (circled)

Observation data Epoch J2000 Equinox ICRS
- Constellation: Pegasus
- Right ascension: 23^{h} 04^{m} 45.65345^{s}
- Declination: +15° 12′ 18.9617″
- Apparent magnitude (V): 2.48

Characteristics
- Spectral type: B9V, B9.5III, B9III A0 IV
- U−B color index: −0.06
- B−V color index: −0.04
- Variable type: suspected

Astrometry
Radial velocity (R_{v})	−2.2 km/s
Proper motion (μ)	RA: +60.40±0.17 mas/yr Dec.: −41.30±0.16 mas/yr
Parallax (π)	24.46±0.19 mas
Distance	133 ± 1 ly (40.9 ± 0.3 pc)
Absolute magnitude (M_{V})	−0.718

Details
Mass	3.5 M_{☉}
Radius	4.62±0.29 R_{☉}
Luminosity	165 L_{☉}
Surface gravity (log g)	3.98±0.25 cgs
Temperature	10,100±100 K
Metallicity [Fe/H]	−0.28 dex
Rotational velocity (v sin i)	130 km/s
Age	200 Myr

Other designations
- Markab, Marchab, 54 Pegasi, HR 8781, BD+14°4926, HD 218045, SAO 108378, FK5 871, HIP 113963

Database references
SIMBAD	data

Alpha Pegasi (α Pegasi, abbreviated Alpha Peg, α Peg), formally named Markab /ˈmɑːrkæb/, is the third-brightest star in the constellation of Pegasus and one of the four stars in the asterism known as the Great Square of Pegasus.

== Properties ==
Alpha Pegasi has a stellar classification of A0 IV, indicating that it is an A-type subgiant star that has exhausted the hydrogen at its core and has evolved beyond the main sequence. Its spectrum has also been classified as B9V and B9.5III.

It is rotating rapidly, with a projected rotational velocity of 130 km/s giving a lower bound on the azimuthal velocity along the star's equator. The effective temperature of the photosphere is about 10,000 K and the star has expanded to nearly five times the radius of the Sun, emitting 165 times as much energy as the sun.

== Nomenclature ==
α Pegasi (Latinised to Alpha Pegasi) is the star's Bayer designation. It bore the traditional name Markab (or Marchab), which derived from an Arabic word مركب markab "the saddle of the horse", or is mistranscription of Mankib, which itself comes from an Arabic phrase منكب الفرس Mankib al-Faras "(the Star of) the Shoulder (of the Constellation) of the Horse" for Beta Pegasi.

In 2016, the International Astronomical Union organized a Working Group on Star Names (WGSN) to catalog and standardize proper names for stars. The WGSN's first bulletin of July 2016 included a table of the first two batches of names approved by the WGSN, which included Markab for this star.

In ancient Indian astronomy, this along with β Pegasi is the main star in Purva Bhadrapada, the 25th nakshatra asterism.

In Chinese, 室宿 (Shì Xiù), meaning Encampment, refers to an asterism consisting α Pegasi and β Pegasi. Consequently, the Chinese name for α Pegasi itself is 室宿一 (Shì Xiù yī), "the First Star of Encampment".
