= Shravana (nakshatra) =

22nd nakshatra in Hindu astronomy

Shravana (Devanagari: श्रवण), also known as Thiruvonam in Tamil and Malayalam (Tamil: திருவோணம், Malayalam: തിരുവോണം), is the 22nd nakshatra or lunar mansion as used in Hindu astronomy, Hindu calendar and Hindu astrology. It belongs to the constellation Makara (Devanagari: मकर), a legendary sea creature resembling a crocodile] or Capricorn.

Lord Venkateswara of Tirupati and Lord Oppiliappan near Kumbakonam, who married Markandeya Rishi's daughter Bhuvalli, are believed to be born in this Nakshatra in the Bhadrapada maasa. Onam, the biggest festival of Kerala, is celebrated on this Nakshathra in the Malayalam month of Chingam.

Traditional Hindu given names are determined by which pada (quarter) of a nakshatra the Ascendant/Lagna was in at the time of birth. In the case of Shravana Nakshatra, the given name would begin with the following syllables:

- Khi (Devanagari: खी)
- Khu (Devanagari: खू)
- Khe (Devanagari: खे)
- Kho (Devanagari: खो)
