= Uttara Ashadha =

26th lunar mansion of Hindu astronomy

Uttara Ashadha (Sanskrit: उत्तर आषाढ lit. "latter victory", "latter unconquered"), also known as Uthiradam/Uthradam in Tamil and Malayalam ( Tamil: உத்திராடம், Malayalam: ഉത്രാടം), is the twenty-first of the 27 Nakshatra (constellations) in Hindu astrology. It is situated on the lower part of Lyra and spans from 26°40" in Sagittarius to 10°00" in Capricorn in the sidereal Vedic zodiac.

== History ==
It has 4 quarters (padas), the first one falls in Sagittarius and the last three padas fall in Capricorn. The sun (Surya) is the lord of Uttara Ashadha. It has a shape of a stage. This nakshatra is symbolised by a tusk of an elephant or by a small bed.

The individuals born in this nakshatra are believed to be one of the most attractive, well-mannered and known for their absolute calmness towards greatest aggression. Due to their sense of independence they are loners and sometimes face difficulties in marriage, the loneliness is also depicted by the animal of this star which is mongoose with no female counterpart. They are believed to be refined, soft-spoken, pure hearted, innocent, and in many cases happen to occupy a very high position in the societies.

It is thought that people born under this nakshatra experience loneliness.

It is believed that the person with this star rising on ascendant has remarkable personality. It is the birth star of famous personalities like George Washington, Abraham Lincoln, Indira Gandhi, Brad Pitt, Muhammad Ali.

People born under this nakshatra are given names that start with Bhe, Bho, Ja, or Ji.

== Astrological significance ==
In Hindu astrology, Uttara Ashadha is ruled by the Sun and symbolized by the elephant tusk, representing victory and authority. Its presiding deities are the Vishvadevas, the universal gods who bestow righteousness, truth, and leadership qualities. This nakshatra is considered auspicious for activities requiring long-term success and moral integrity.
