= Uttara Bhadrapada =

26th lunar mansion in Hindu astronomy

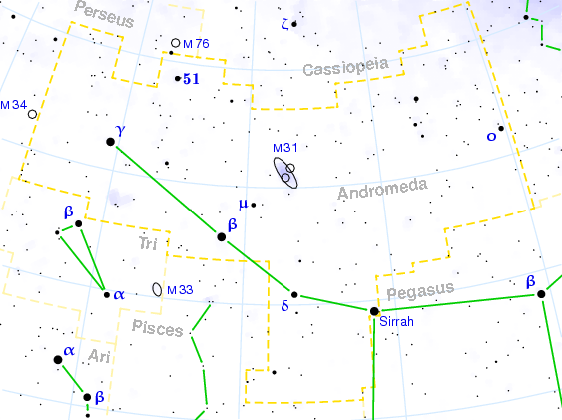
Andromeda map showing one of the stars of Uttara Bhādrapadā

Uttara Bhādrapadā or Uttṛṭṭāti (Devanagari: उत्तरभाद्रपदा) is the twenty-sixth nakshatra in Hindu astrology, corresponding to γ Pegasi and α Andromedae. It is ruled by Shani, the deity identified with the planet Saturn.

Under the beliefs of electional astrology, Uttara Bhādrapadā is a Fixed constellation, meaning that while it is prominent, it is a good time to build houses, found communities or engage in other activities related to permanence, stability and structure.

Uttara Bhādrapadā is represented by dualistic imagery, often two legs of a bed. Other common symbols include a two-headed man, or twins. The Ahirbudhnya, a serpentine or draconian creature, is the deity which oversees Uttara Bhādrapadā.

Male Natives: Physical features: Most attractive and innocent looking person. There is an inherent magnetically force in his look. If he looks at a person with a mild smile, rest assure, that person will be his slave.

Character and general events: He keeps equal relationship with high and low people i.e. irrespective of the status of the person. He has a spot-less heart. He does not like to give troubles to others. The only drawback noticed in this native in the behavioral field is that temper is always on the tip of his nose. However, such short-temper is not of a permanent nature. He will not hesitate to sacrifice even his life to those who love him. At the same time once he is hurt he will become a lion. He has wisdom, knowledge, and personality. He is expert in delivering attractive speeches. He is capable of vanquishing his enemies and attains fairly high position.

Education and sources of earnings / profession: He can attain mastery over several subjects at the same time. Even if he is not academically much educated, his expression and knowledge put forward to the world will equal to that of highly educated persons. He is much interested in fine arts and has ability to write prolonged articles or books. In the work field, he can shine well due to his extraordinary capacity and capability. Laziness is a remote question for him. Once he opts to undertake a job he cannot turn back till that job is completed. Even in the case of utter failure he is not desperate. If he is employed he will reach to the top. In most of the cases it has been noticed that even if this Nakshatra born persons are employed initially in the lower or middle level positions, they later on reach to a good position and they always receive reward and praise from others.

Family life: While he keeps praising his father on the one side due to the prominent personality and religious rigidity of his father, he cannot virtually derive any benefit from his father. He leads a neglected childhood. He is normally subjected to a life away from his home town. His married life will be full of happiness. He will be blessed to have a most suitable wife. His children also will be an asset, most obedient, understanding and respecting children. He will be blessed with grandchildren also. He is an ornament in his family.

Health: His health will be very good. He is non-care about his own health. Hence he will search for a doctor only when he is seriously ill. He is prone to paralytic attack, stomach problems, piles, and hernia.

Female Natives: Women born in this Nakshatra will also enjoy more or less the same results as that is applicable for male natives mentioned above. In addition, the following results will also be enjoyed: Physical features: She is of medium height with stout body. Large and protruding eyes.

Character and general events: She is a real "Lakshmi" (goddess of wealth) in the family. She is the embodiment of a real family woman. Her behavior is extremely cordial, respectful and praise worthy. Adaptability as the circumstances warrants. Suitability as the occasion warrants and lastly impartiality as the country needs are her main characteristics. When all these three essentials required for the present day are combined in one, what more I can describe or attribute to her character. . Education, sources of earning / profession: Employed females can attain good positions due to their own effort. She is best suited to the profession of a lawyer or arbitrator. She is also a good nurse or a doctor.

Family life: These women will be a gem in any family they are born or married. In other words, their foot-steps are sufficient to bring in Laxmi (goddess of wealth). .

Health: She is prone to rheumatic pains, acute indigestion, constipation, hernia and in some cases tuberculosis of low intensity.

Choosing Baby names for birth star Uthrattathi: Those having Lagna or Lagna Lord in Uthrattathi, name should start with the following Syllable Thu, Gya, Sha, Shre

Traditional Hindu given names are determined by which pada (quarter) of a nakshatra the Lagna or Lagna Lord was in at the time of birth. The given name would begin with the following syllables:

- Du (Devanagari: दु)
- Jha (Devanagari: ज)
- Tha (Devanagari: थ)
- Da/Tra (Devanagari: ञ)
