= Beta Pegasi =

Red giant star in the constellation Pegasus

- Location of β Pegasi (circled)

Observation data Epoch J2000 Equinox ICRS
- Constellation: Pegasus
- Right ascension: 23^{h} 03^{m} 46.45746^{s}
- Declination: +28° 04′ 58.0336″
- Apparent magnitude (V): 2.31 – 2.74

Characteristics
- Evolutionary stage: AGB
- Spectral type: M2.5II–IIIe
- U−B color index: +1.96
- B−V color index: +1.67
- Variable type: Semi-regular

Astrometry
Radial velocity (R_{v})	+8.7 km/s
Proper motion (μ)	RA: +187.65 mas/yr Dec.: +136.93 mas/yr
Parallax (π)	16.64±0.15 mas
Distance	196 ± 2 ly (60.1 ± 0.5 pc)
Absolute magnitude (M_{V})	−1.41

Details
Mass	1.7±0.3 M_{☉}
Radius	109±7 R_{☉}
Luminosity	1,644 (Note: Calculated from bolometric magnitude in the equation 10^{0.4(4.74-M_{bol})}, where "M_{bol}" is the bolometric magnitude.) L_{☉}
Surface gravity (log g)	1.20 cgs
Temperature	3,606 K
Metallicity [Fe/H]	−0.11 dex
Rotational velocity (v sin i)	9.7 km/s

Other designations
- Scheat, 53 Pegasi, HR 8775, BD+27°4480, HD 217906, SAO 90981, FK5 870, HIP 113881

Database references
SIMBAD	data

Beta Pegasi (β Pegasi, abbreviated Beta Peg, β Peg), formally named Scheat /ˈʃiːæt/, is a red giant star and the second-brightest star (after Epsilon Pegasi) in the constellation of Pegasus. It forms the upper right corner of the Great Square of Pegasus, a prominent rectangular asterism.

== Nomenclature ==
β Pegasi (Latinised to Beta Pegasi) is the star's Bayer designation.

It bore the traditional name of Scheat, a name that had also been used for Delta Aquarii. The name was derived from the Arabic Al Sā'id "the upper arm", or from Sa'd. In 2016, the International Astronomical Union organised a Working Group on Star Names (WGSN) to catalog and standardise proper names for stars. The WGSN's first bulletin of July 2016 included a table of the first two batches of names approved by the WGSN; which included Scheat for this star (the name Skat was later approved for Delta Aquarii).

In Chinese, 室宿 (Shì Xiù), meaning Encampment, refers to an asterism consisting β Pegasi and α Pegasi. Consequently, the Chinese name for β Pegasi itself is 室宿二 (Shì Xiù èr), "the Second Star of Encampment".

== Distance and properties ==
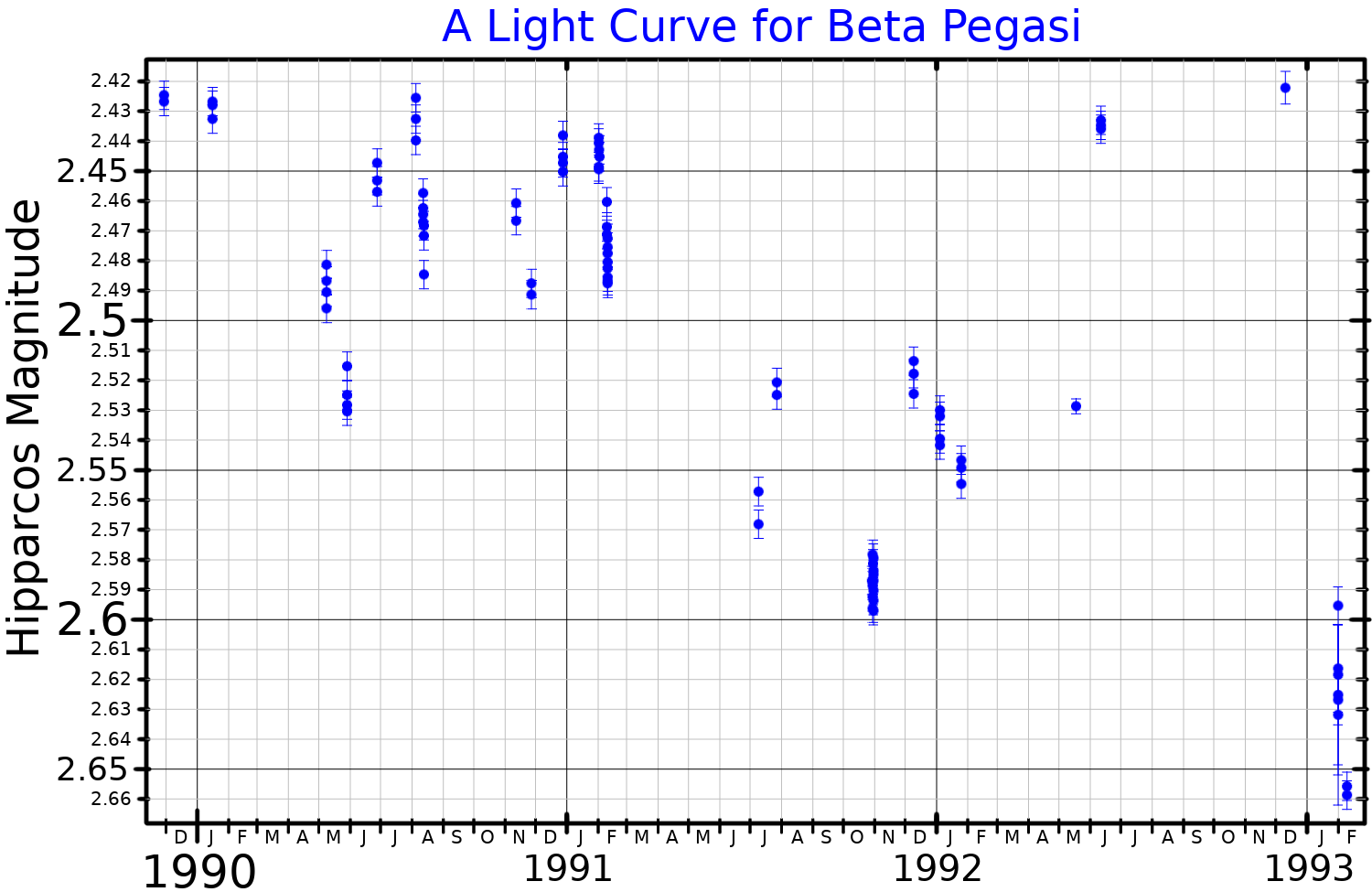
A light curve for Beta Pegasi, plotted from Hipparcos data

Based upon parallax measurements, Beta Pegasi is located about 196 light-years (60 parsecs) from the Sun. It is unusual among bright stars in having a relatively cool surface temperature compared to stars like the Sun. This star has a stellar classification of M2.3 II–III, which indicates the spectrum has characteristics partway between a bright giant and a giant star. It has expanded until it is 109 times as large, and has a total luminosity of 1,640 times that of the Sun. The effective temperature of the star's outer envelope is about 3,600 K, giving the star the characteristic orange-red hue of an M-type star. The photosphere is sufficiently cool for molecules of titanium oxide to form.

Johann Friedrich Julius Schmidt discovered that Beta Pegasi is a variable star, in 1847. Beta Pegasi is a semi-regular variable with a period of 43.3 days and a brightness that varies from magnitude +2.31 to +2.74. It is losing mass at a rate at or below 10^{−8} times the Sun's mass per year, which is creating an expanding shell of gas and dust with a radius of about 3,500 times the Sun's radius (16 astronomical units).
