= Alpha Delphini =

Multiple star system in the constellation Delphinus

α Delphini A
- Location of α Delphini (circled)

Observation data Epoch J2000.0 Equinox ICRS
- Constellation: Delphinus
- Right ascension: 20^{h} 39^{m} 38.280^{s}
- Declination: +15° 54′ 43.776″
- Apparent magnitude (V): +3.777 (3.86 + 6.43)

Characteristics
- Spectral type: B9 IV
- U−B color index: −0.205
- B−V color index: −0.061

Astrometry
Radial velocity (R_{v})	−3.40 km/s
Proper motion (μ)	RA: 71.574 mas/yr Dec.: −30.655 mas/yr
Parallax (π)	13.7298±0.3502 mas
Distance	238 ± 6 ly (73 ± 2 pc)
Absolute magnitude (M_{V})	−0.4

Orbit
Primary	Aa (A)
Secondary	Ab (B)
Period (P)	6175.3±3.2 d
Semi-major axis (a)	0.15809±0.00013" (12.7±0.4 AU)
Eccentricity (e)	0.4615±0.0016
Inclination (i)	161.01±0.30°
Longitude of the node (Ω)	120.62±1.19°
Periastron epoch (T)	JD57988.7
Argument of periastron (ω) (secondary)	91.73±1.09°

Orbit
Primary	Ab1 (Ba)
Secondary	Ab2 (Bb)
Period (P)	29.9873±0.0021 d
Semi-major axis (a)	0.0003587±0.000010" (0.281±0.008 AU)
Eccentricity (e)	0.0761±0.0012
Inclination (i)	22.11±0.61°
Longitude of the node (Ω)	359.97±0.65°
Periastron epoch (T)	JD58762.84
Argument of periastron (ω) (secondary)	166.43±1.27°
Semi-amplitude (K_{2}) (secondary)	21.19±0.18 km/s

Details

Aa (A)
Mass	3.83±0.33 M_{☉}
Radius	3.92 R_{☉}
Surface gravity (log g)	3.93 cgs
Temperature	11,643 K
Metallicity [Fe/H]	−0.49 dex
Rotational velocity (v sin i)	144 km/s
Age	227 Myr

Ab1 (Ba)
Mass	1.82±0.15 M_{☉}

Ab2 (Bb)
Mass	1.49±0.12 M_{☉}

Other designations
- Sualocin, α Del, 9 Delphini, BD+15 4222, FK5 774, GC 28780, HD 196867, HIP 101958, HR 7906, SAO 106357, CCDM J20396+1555, WDS J20396+1555

Database references
SIMBAD	data

Alpha Delphini is a multiple star system in the northern constellation of Delphinus. It is visible to the naked eye as point of light with a combined apparent visual magnitude of 3.78. Based on parallax measurements, it is located at a distance of approximately 238 light years from the Sun. The system is drifting closer with a line of sight velocity component of −3.4 km/s.

It consists of a triple star, designated Alpha Delphini A, together with five faint, probably optical companions, designated Alpha Delphini B, C, D, E and F. A's two components are themselves designated Alpha Delphini Aa (officially named Sualocin /ˈswɒloʊsɪn/, the historical name for the entire system) and Ab.

== Nomenclature ==
α Delphini (Latinised to Alpha Delphini) is the system's Bayer designation, abbreviated Alpha Del or α Del. The designations of the six constituents as Alpha Delphini A to F, and those of A's components - Alpha Delphini Aa and Ab - derive from the convention used by the Washington Multiplicity Catalog (WMC) for multiple star systems, and adopted by the International Astronomical Union (IAU). The primary star's components Aa, Ab1, and Ab2 are also sometimes referred to as A, Ba, and Bb respectively, given that the outer pair have been resolved.

The system bore an historical name, Sualocin, which arose as follows: Niccolò Cacciatore was the assistant to Giuseppe Piazzi, and later his successor as Director of the Palermo Observatory. The name first appeared in Piazzi's Palermo Star Catalogue. When the Catalogue was published in 1814, the unfamiliar names Sualocin and Rotanev were attached to Alpha and Beta Delphini, respectively. Eventually the Reverend Thomas Webb, a British astronomer, puzzled out the explanation. Cacciatore's name, Nicholas Hunter in English translation, would be Latinised to Nicolaus Venator. Reversing the letters of this construction produces the two star-names. They have endured, the result of Cacciatore's little practical joke of naming the two stars after himself.

In 2016, the International Astronomical Union organized a Working Group on Star Names (WGSN) to catalogue and standardize proper names for stars. The WGSN decided to attribute proper names to individual stars rather than entire multiple systems. It approved the name Sualocin for the component Alpha Delphini Aa on 12 September 2016, and it is now so included in the List of IAU-approved Star Names.

In Chinese, 瓠瓜 (Hù Guā), meaning Good Gourd, refers to an asterism consisting of Alpha Delphini, Gamma^{2} Delphini, Delta Delphini, Beta Delphini and Zeta Delphini. Consequently, the Chinese name for Alpha Delphini itself is 瓠瓜一 (Hù Guā yī, English: the First Star of Good Gourd).

In Hindu astronomy, the star corresponded to one of the nakshatras named Dhanishta.

== Properties ==
Alpha Delphini A is a spectroscopic binary star which has now been resolved using speckle interferometry. The components are separated by 0.2″ and have a 17-year orbit. Alpha Delphini Aa has a spectral type of B9IV. It is a subgiant that has begun to evolve away from the main sequence, is about 3.8 times as massive as the sun and about twice as hot.

The spectral type of the secondary star cannot be determined as it is too close and too faint compared to the primary, but it has been shown to itself be a binary star with an orbit of 30 days. Spectral lines showing 30-day radial velocity changes are likely to belong to the faintest component, expected from its mass to be an F-type star. Then the more massive star of the inner pair is likely to be an A-type dwarf, possibly not detected in the spectral because rapid rotation blurs its absorption lines.

The five faint companions have visual magnitudes around 11th to 13th magnitude and separations of 35" to 72". They all show motion relative to Alpha Delphini A, and have much smaller parallaxes.
