= Dhanishtha =

23rd nakshatra in Hindu astronomy

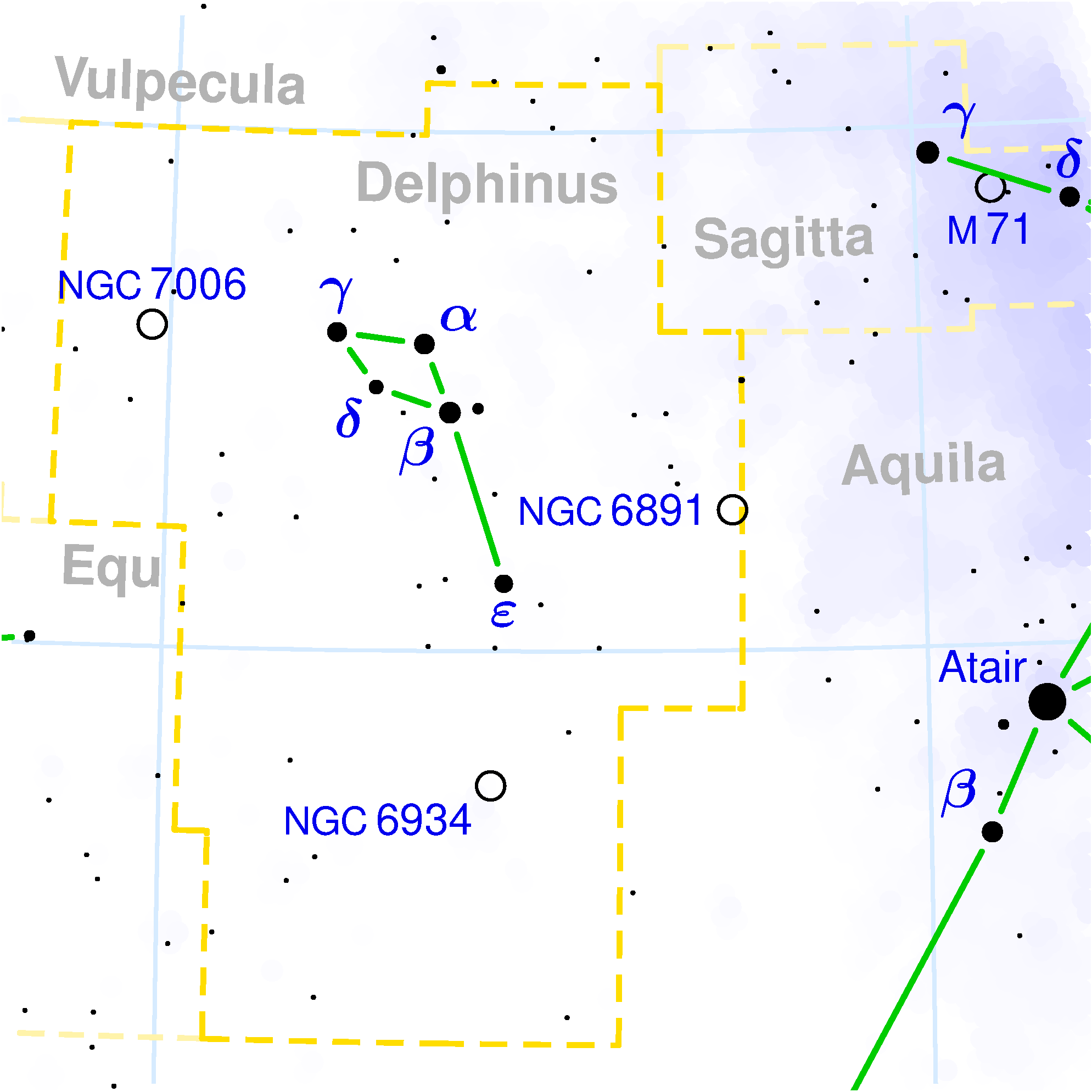
Delphinus map showing Dhanishta

Dhanishtha (Devanagari: धनिष्ठा, Telugu: ధనిష్ఠ, Kannada: ಧನಿಷ್ಠ), meaning "most famous", also known as Avittam in Tamil and Malayalam (Tamil: அவிட்டம், Malayalam: അവിട്ടം), is the twenty-third nakshatra in Hindu astronomy, corresponding to the four brightest stars of Delphinus: α, β, γ, and δ Delphini. The IAU Working Group on Star Names adopted the name Dhanishta for the star γ^{1} Delphini in 2026.

== Astrology ==
In Jyotiṣa, Dhanishta is ruled by Mangala (the planet Mars). Dhanishta is classified as a movable nakshatra, meaning that, under electional astrological beliefs, it is best to begin activities like travel when the moon is in Dhanishta. This is based on the Panchanga reading only (which is also known as a calendar to track the suitable day for doing or starting anything good).

The deities which preside over Dhanishta are the Ashta Vasus: Agni, Prithvi, Vāyu, Varuna, Dyaus, Surya, Chandramas and Dhruva. The powers bestowed by the Ashta Vasus comes under the domain of Lord Nataraja who is the main supreme deity of this nakshatra. The animal associated to this nakshatra is a female lion and it is symbolized as "A Lioness which is resting majestically after a Lioness's share". The symbol that is most commonly used to represent Dhanishta is the drum known as the Udukai in Tamil and Damaru in Sanskrit.

It is the birth star of a great Tamil Siddhar Tirumular and also the birth star of Bhishma, a great hero in the Mahabharata epic.

Traditional Hindu given names are determined by which pada (quarter) of a nakshatra the Ascendant/Lagna was in at the time of birth. In the case of Dhanista, the given name would begin with the following syllables:

- Ga (ग-गा/గ-గా/கா/ಗ-ಗಾ)
- Gi (गि/గి/கி/ಗಿ)
- Gu (गु/గు/கு/ಗು)
- Ge (गे/గే/கே/ಗೇ)

== In popular culture ==
In the Indian web series Asur (Indian web series), the killer Shubh Joshi was known to target people of Dhanistha nakshatra.
