= C/1890 V1 (Zona) =

Non-periodic comet

Discovery
- Discovered by: Temistocle Zona
- Discovery site: Palermo Astronomical Observatory
- Discovery date: 15 November 1890

Designations
- Alternative designations: 1890 IV, 1890e

Orbital characteristics
- Epoch: 7 December 1890 (JD 2411708.5)
- Observation arc: 6 days
- Number of observations: 5
- Aphelion: 720.331 AU
- Perihelion: 2.039 AU
- Semi-major axis: 361.185 AU
- Eccentricity: 0.994352
- Orbital period: ~6,860 years
- Inclination: 154.264°
- Longitude of ascending node: 86.891°
- Argument of periapsis: 330.879°
- Last perihelion: 6 August 1890
- T_{Jupiter}: –1.579
- Earth MOID: 1.0892 AU
- Jupiter MOID: 1.8205 AU

C/1890 V1 (Zona) is a non-periodic comet discovered on 15 November 1890 by the Italian astronomer Temistocle Zona with an equatorially mounted Merz telescope at the Osservatorio Astronomico di Palermo. Whilst attempting to observe this comet on 17 November, Rudolf F. Spitaler discovered the eponymous 113P/Spitaler very close to where Zona's Comet was positioned.
