= Delphinus =

Constellation in the northern celestial hemisphere

- Constellation
- List of stars in Delphinus
- Abbreviation: Del
- Genitive: Delphini
- Pronunciation: /dɛlˈfaɪnəs/ Delfínus, genitive /dɛlˈfaɪnaɪ/
- Symbolism: dolphin
- Right ascension: 20^{h} 14^{m} 14.1594^{s}–21^{h} 08^{m} 59.6073^{s}
- Declination: +2.4021468°–+20.9399471°
- Quadrant: NQ4
- Area: 189 sq. deg. (69th)
- Main stars: 5
- Bayer/Flamsteed stars: 19
- Stars brighter than 3.00^{m}: 0
- Stars within 10.00 pc (32.62 ly): 3
- Brightest star: Rotanev (β Del) (3.63^{m})
- Nearest star: WISE 2056+1459
- Messier objects: 0
- Meteor showers: None
- Bordering constellations: Vulpecula; Sagitta; Aquila; Aquarius; Equuleus; Pegasus
- Visible at latitudes between +90° and −69°. Best visible at 21:00 (9 p.m.) during the month of September.

Delphinus is a small constellation in the Northern Celestial Hemisphere, close to the celestial equator. Its name is the Latin version for the Greek word for dolphin (δελφίς). It is one of the 48 constellations listed by the 2nd-century astronomer Ptolemy, and remains one of the 88 modern constellations recognized by the International Astronomical Union. It is one of the smaller constellations, ranked 69th in size. Delphinus' five brightest stars form a distinctive asterism symbolizing a dolphin with four stars representing the body and one the tail. It is bordered (clockwise from north) by Vulpecula, Sagitta, Aquila, Aquarius, Equuleus and Pegasus.

Delphinus is a faint constellation with only two stars brighter than an apparent magnitude of 4, Beta Delphini (Rotanev) at magnitude 3.6 and Alpha Delphini (Sualocin) at magnitude 3.8.

== Mythology ==
Delphinus is associated with two stories from Greek mythology.

According to myth, the first Greek god Poseidon wanted to marry Amphitrite, a beautiful nereid. However, wanting to protect her virginity, she fled to the Atlas Mountains. Her suitor then sent out several searchers, among them a certain Delphinus. Delphinus accidentally stumbled upon her and persuaded Amphitrite to accept Poseidon's wooing. Out of gratitude, the god placed the image of a dolphin among the stars.

The second story tells of the Greek poet Arion of Lesbos (7th century BC), whom a dolphin saved. He was a court musician at the palace of Periander, ruler of Corinth. Arion had amassed a fortune during his travels to Sicily and Italy. On his way home from Tarentum, his wealth caused the crew of his ship to conspire against him. Threatened with death, Arion asked to be granted a last wish, which the crew granted: he wanted to sing a dirge. This he did, and while doing so, flung himself into the sea. There, he was rescued by a dolphin which had been charmed by Arion's music. The dolphin carried Arion to the coast of Greece and left.

=== In non-Western astronomy ===
In Chinese astronomy, the stars of Delphinus are located within the Black Tortoise of the North (北方玄武, Běi Fāng Xuán Wǔ).

In Polynesia, two cultures recognized Delphinus as a constellation. In Pukapuka, it was called Te Toloa and in the Tuamotus, it was called Te Uru-o-tiki.

In Hindu astrology, the Delphinus corresponds to the Nakshatra, or lunar mansion, of Dhanishta.

== Characteristics ==
Delphinus is bordered by Vulpecula to the north, Sagitta to the northwest, Aquila to the west and southwest, Aquarius to the southeast, Equuleus to the east and Pegasus to the east. Covering 188.5 square degrees, corresponding to 0.457% of the sky, it ranks 69th of the 88 constellations in size. The three-letter abbreviation for the constellation, as adopted by the IAU in 1922, is "Del". The official constellation boundaries, as set by Eugène Delporte in 1930, are defined by a polygon of 14 segments. In the equatorial coordinate system, the right ascension coordinates of these borders lie between 20^{h} 14^{m} 14.1594^{s} and 21^{h} 08^{m} 59.6073^{s}, while the declination coordinates are between +2.4021468° and +20.9399471°. The whole constellation is visible to observers north of latitude 69°S. (Note: While parts of the constellation rise above the horizon to observers between 69°S and 87°S, stars within a few degrees of the horizon are practically unobservable.)

== Features ==
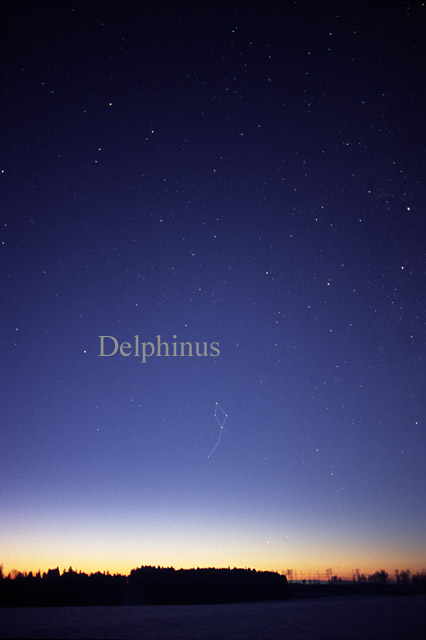
The constellation Delphinus as it can be seen by the naked eye

=== Stars ===
Delphinus has two stars above fourth (apparent) magnitude; its brightest star is of magnitude 3.6. The main asterism in Delphinus is Job's Coffin, nearly a 45°-apex lozenge or diamond of the four brightest stars: Alpha, Beta, Gamma, and Delta Delphini. Delphinus is in a rich Milky Way star field. Alpha and Beta Delphini have 19th-century names Sualocin and Rotanev, read backwards: Nicolaus Venator, the Latinized name of a Palermo Observatory director, Niccolò Cacciatore (d. 1841).

Alpha Delphini is a blue-white hued main sequence star of magnitude 3.8, 241 light-years from Earth. It is a spectroscopic binary. It is officially named Sualocin. The star has an absolute magnitude of -0.4.

Beta Delphini is officially called Rotanev. It was found to be a binary star in 1873. The gap between its close binary stars is visible from large amateur telescopes. To the unaided eye, it appears to be a white star of magnitude 3.6. It has a period of 27 years and is 97 light-years from Earth.

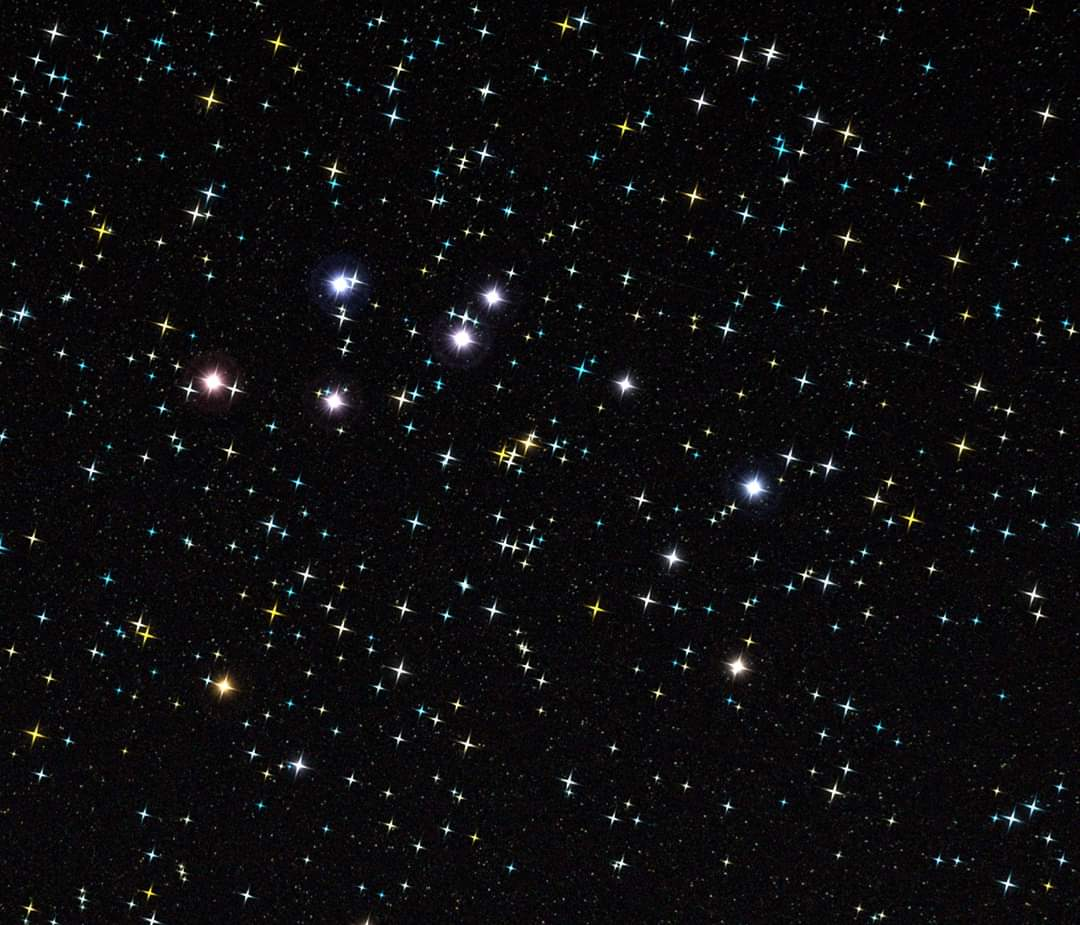
Contrast and color-enhanced photograph of Delphinus

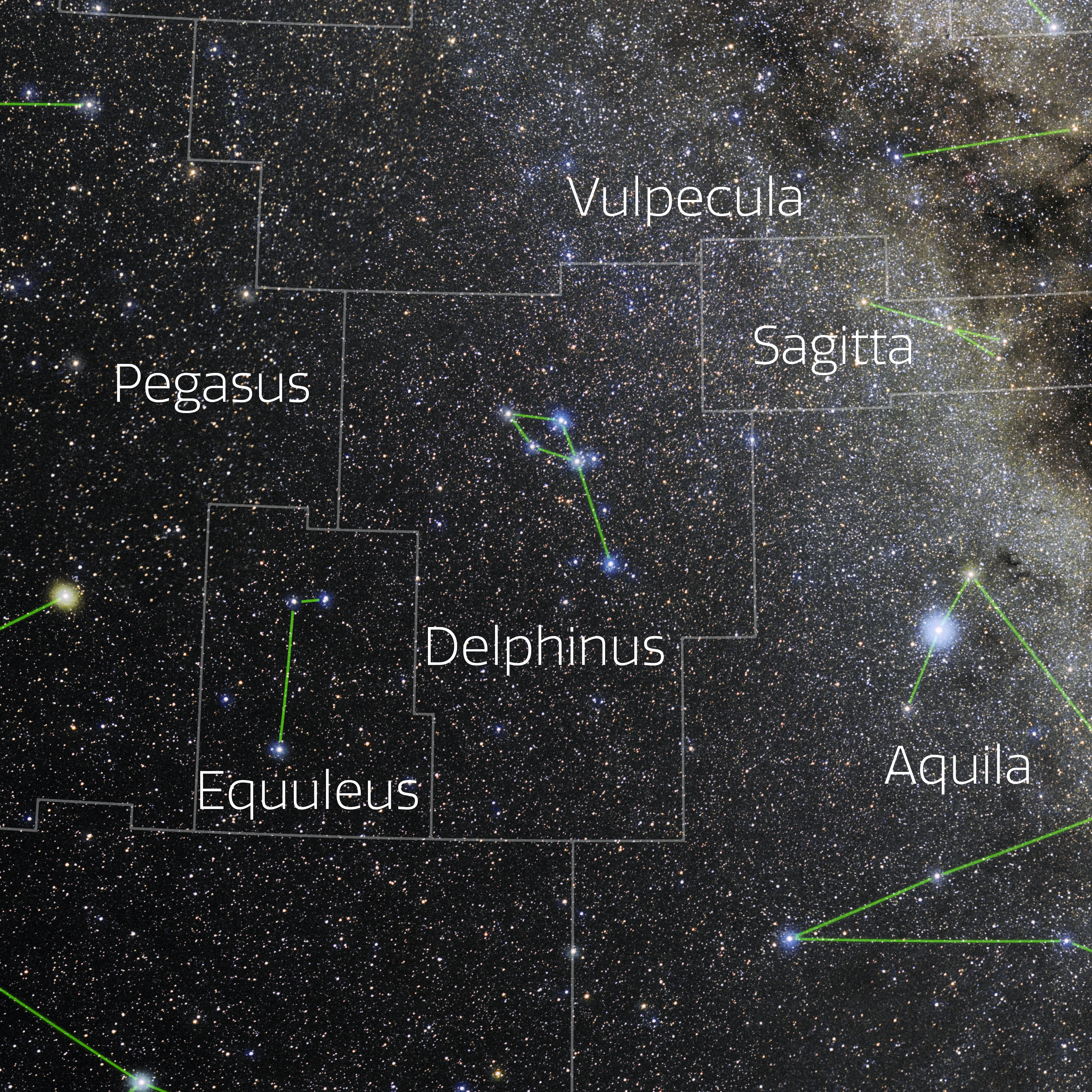
The constellation Delphinus showing the IAU boundaries, the constellation stick figure, and labels for its brightest stars. Astrophotograph by Eckhard Slawik, from NOIRLab's 88 Constellations project.

Gamma Delphini is a celebrated binary star among amateur astronomers. The primary is orange-gold of magnitude 4.3; the secondary is a light yellow star of magnitude 5.1. The pair forms a true binary with an estimated orbital period of over 3,000 years. 125 light-years away, the two components are visible in a small amateur telescope. The secondary, also described as green, is 10 arcseconds from the primary. Struve 2725, called the "Ghost Double", is a pair that appears similar but dimmer. Its components of magnitudes 7.6 and 8.4 are separated by 6 arcseconds and are 15 arcminutes from Gamma Delphini itself. An unconfirmed exoplanet with a minimum mass of 0.7 Jupiter masses may orbit one of the stars.

Delta Delphini is a type A-type star of magnitude 4.43. It is a spectroscopic binary, and both stars are Delta Scuti variables.

Epsilon Delphini, Deneb Dulfim (lit. "tail [of the] Dolphin"), or Aldulfin, is a star of stellar class B6 III. Its magnitude is variable at around 4.03.

Zeta Delphini, an A3Va main-sequence star of magnitude 4.6, was in 2014 discovered to have a brown dwarf orbiting around it. Zeta Delphini B has a mass of 50±15 M_{J}.

Animation fading-in of Aquila, Delphinus, Sagitta, and the summer Milky Way as seen in Dark-sky preserve Westhavelland

Rho Aquilae at magnitude 4.94 is at about 150 light-years away. Due to its proper motion, it has been in the (round-figure parameter) bounds of the constellation since 1992. It is an A-type main sequence star with a lower metallicity than the Sun.

HR Delphini was a nova that brightened to magnitude 3.5 in December 1967. It took an unusually long time for the nova to reach peak brightness which indicate that it barely satisfied the conditions for a thermonuclear runaway. Another nova by the name V339 Delphini was detected in 2013; it peaked at magnitude 4.3 and was the first nova observed to produce lithium.

Musica, also known by its Flamsteed designation 18 Delphini, is one of the five stars with known planets located in Delphinus. It has a spectral type of G6 III. Arion, the planet, is a very dense and massive planet with a mass at least 10.3 times greater than Jupiter. Arion was part of the first NameExoWorlds contest where the public got the opportunity to suggest names for exoplanets and their host stars.

=== Exoplanets ===
In 2024 the planet TOI-6883 b was discovered in the constellation Delphinus. It has a 16.249 day orbital period around its host star, a radius 1.08 times Jupiter's, and a mass 4.34 times Jupiter's. It was discovered from a single transit in TESS data and it was confirmed by a network of citizen scientists.

In 2024, the planet TOI-6883 c was discovered in the constellation Delphinus. It has an orbital period of 7.8458 days, a radius of 0.7 times Jupiter's, and a third of Jupiter's mass. The Neptunian-size planet was discovered from an abnormality in data retrieved from TOI-6883 c.

=== Deep-sky objects ===
Its rich Milky Way star field means many modestly deep-sky objects. NGC 6891 is a planetary nebula of magnitude 10.5; another is NGC 6905 or the Blue Flash Nebula. The Blue Flash Nebula shows broad emission lines. The central star in NGC 6905 has a spectral type of WO2, meaning it is rich in oxygen.

NGC 6934 is a globular cluster of magnitude 9.75. It is about 52,000 light-years away from the Solar System. It is in the Shapley-Sawyer Concentration Class VIII and is thought to share a common origin with another globular cluster in Boötes. It has an intermediate metallicity for a globular cluster, but as of 2018 it has been poorly studied. At a distance of about 137,000 light-years, the globular cluster NGC 7006 is at the outer reaches of the galaxy. It is also fairly dim at magnitude 11.5 and is in Class I.

== See also ==
- Delphinus (Chinese astronomy)
