= IC 831 =

Galaxy in the constellation Coma Berenices

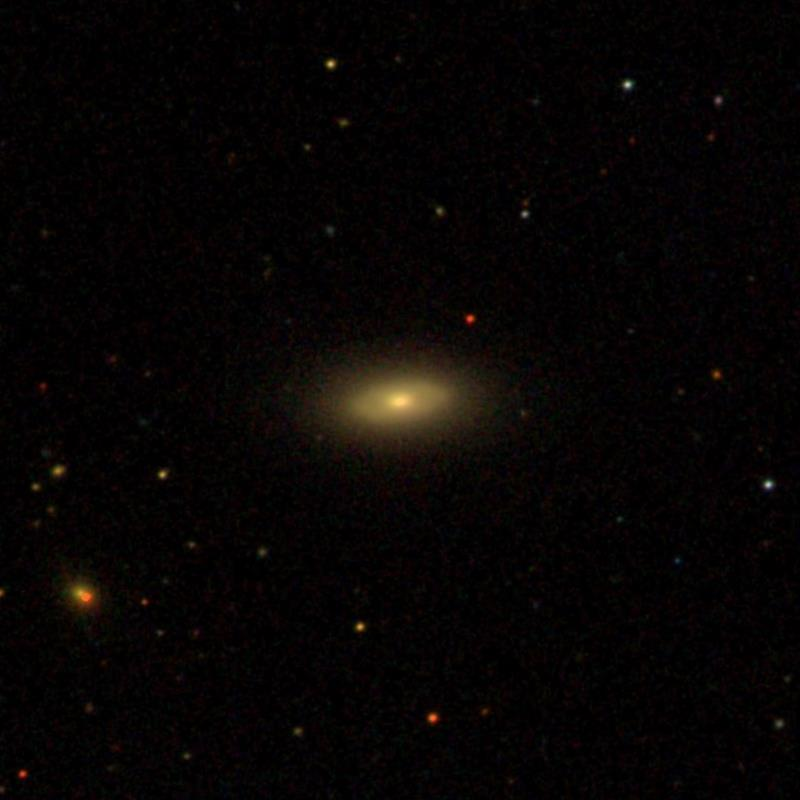
- Sloan Digital Sky Survey of IC 831

Observation data (J2000 epoch)
- Constellation: Coma Berenices
- Right ascension: 12^{h} 52^{m} 44.10^{s}
- Declination: +26° 28′ 13.8″
- Redshift: 0.02129
- Heliocentric radial velocity: 6,406 km/s
- Distance: 300 Mly (92 Mpc)
- Apparent magnitude (V): 17.93

Characteristics
- Type: E
- Size: 60,000 ly
- Notable features: Galaxy host of supernova iPTF14atg

Other designations
- PGC 43708, 2MASX J12524408+2628135, MCG+05-30-113, AGC 221803, CAIRNS J125244.02+262813.6, SDSS J125244.06+262813.4, [DFO95] 113, LEDA 43708

IC 831 is a type E-S0 elliptical galaxy located 300 million light-years away from the Solar System in the constellation of Coma Berenices. It is estimated to be 60,000 light-years in diameter and was first discovered on 25 February 1892 by Rudolf Spitaler, an Austrian astronomer. It is not known whether it has an active galactic nucleus.

== Supernova ==
Type Ia supernova, iPTF14atg was discovered in IC 831 on May 3, 2015, which was similar to SN 2002es that exploded prior to that, in UGC 2708, a lenticular galaxy. The progenitor type was a white dwarf, in which when it exploded, some of the shockwaves impacted its companion star. It was discovered by Intermediate Palomar Transient Factory in California.
