= Urata =

Urata (written: 浦田) is a Japanese surname. Notable people with the surname include:

- Haruo Urata (浦田 春生, born 1962), Japanese long-distance runner
- Itsuki Urata (浦田 樹, born 1997), Japanese footballer
- Naoki Urata (浦田 尚希, born 1974), Japanese footballer
- Naoya Urata (浦田 直也, born 1982), Japanese singer, actor and dancer
- Nobuhisa Urata (浦田 延尚, born 1989), Japanese footballer
- Takeshi Urata (浦田 武, 1947–2012), Japanese astronomer

== See also ==
- 3722 Urata
- 112P/Urata–Niijima
- Urata Station, a railway station in Iizuka, Fukuoka, Japan
