= CA78 =

CA78 or CA-78 may refer to:

- California State Route 78, a highway in the US state of California
- Tarui Station (Gifu), a railway station in Tarui, Japan (station code CA78)
- Caldwell 78, a star cluster
