= IC 719 =

Galaxy in the constellation Virgo

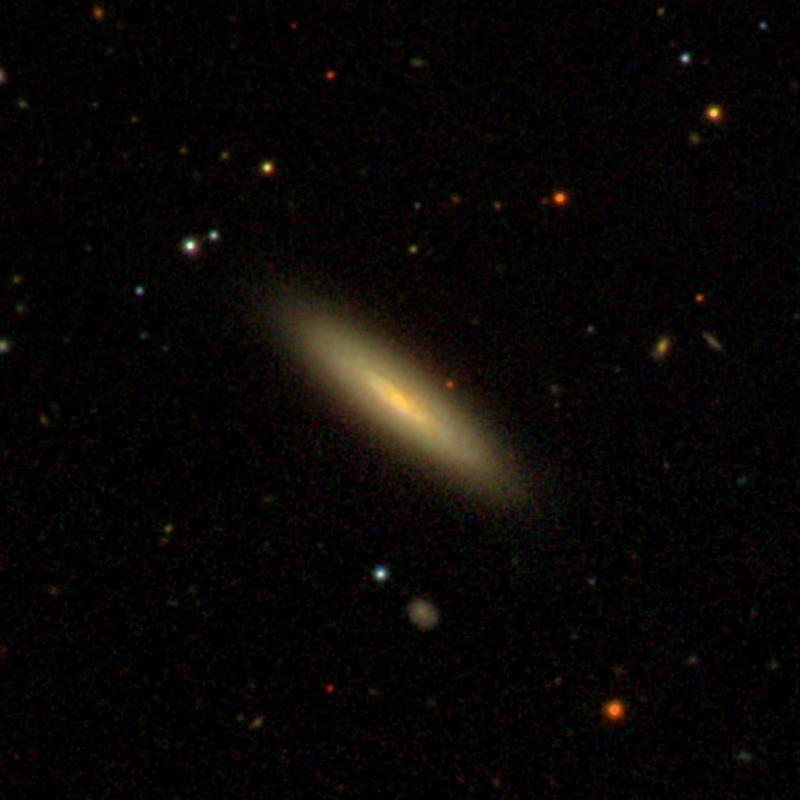
- The lenticular galaxy IC 719

Observation data (J2000 epoch)
- Constellation: Virgo
- Right ascension: 11^{h} 40^{m} 18.50^{s}
- Declination: +09° 00′ 36.00″
- Redshift: 0.006114
- Heliocentric radial velocity: 1,833 km/s ± 2
- Distance: 105 Mly
- Apparent magnitude (V): 12.8

Characteristics
- Type: S0?
- Size: ~52,400 ly (16.08 kpc) (estimated)

Other designations
- 2MFGC 09147, ARK 308, CGCG 068-021, EVCC 001, IRAS 11377+0917, LEDA 36205, NSA 169795, UGC 6633, VFID 5279 LEDA 1357841

IC 719 is a lenticular galaxy located in the constellation of Virgo. The redshift of the galaxy is estimated to be (z) 0.0061 and it was first discovered in March 1892 by the Austrian astronomer named Rudolph Spitaler who described it as a 13th magnitude galaxy.

== Description ==
IC 719 is an early-type lenticular galaxy with an S0 classification. It has an almost bulgeless appearance and has a disk of H II gas that extends 100 kiloparsecs from its galactic center. There is also a secondary stellar disk component located in the same plane position as the ionized gas content in the galaxy. The stars in the ionized gas region are much younger and can be categorized as metal-rich when compared to the counterrotating component. The total molecular gas mass of the galaxy is estimated to be 8.34 ± 0.05 M_{☉}, while the star formation is around 0.5 M_{☉} per year, with most star formation activity taking place within an elliptical ring.

A study published in August 2018, has found that the main stellar disk component of IC 719 is even hotter and much older, with a larger scale length, compared to the secondary disk component. When further observed, there are clearly two extended stellar components rotating opposite from each other. The more the velocity difference increases, the more the absorption lines are shown to separate. The main stellar disk is located on the northwest side of the galaxy, with rotation approximately ± 150 kilometers per second and a velocity dispersion shown to differ between 70 and 30 kilometers per second from its central radius right outwards to its outermost regions. The secondary disk, meanwhile, has a steeper velocity gradient and is much colder kinematically.

== Supernova ==
One supernova has been observed in IC 719: SN 2021kos (Type Ib, mag. 18.34) was discovered by the Zwicky Transient Facility on 19 April 2021.
