= IC 883 =

Irregular galaxy in the constellation Canes Venatici

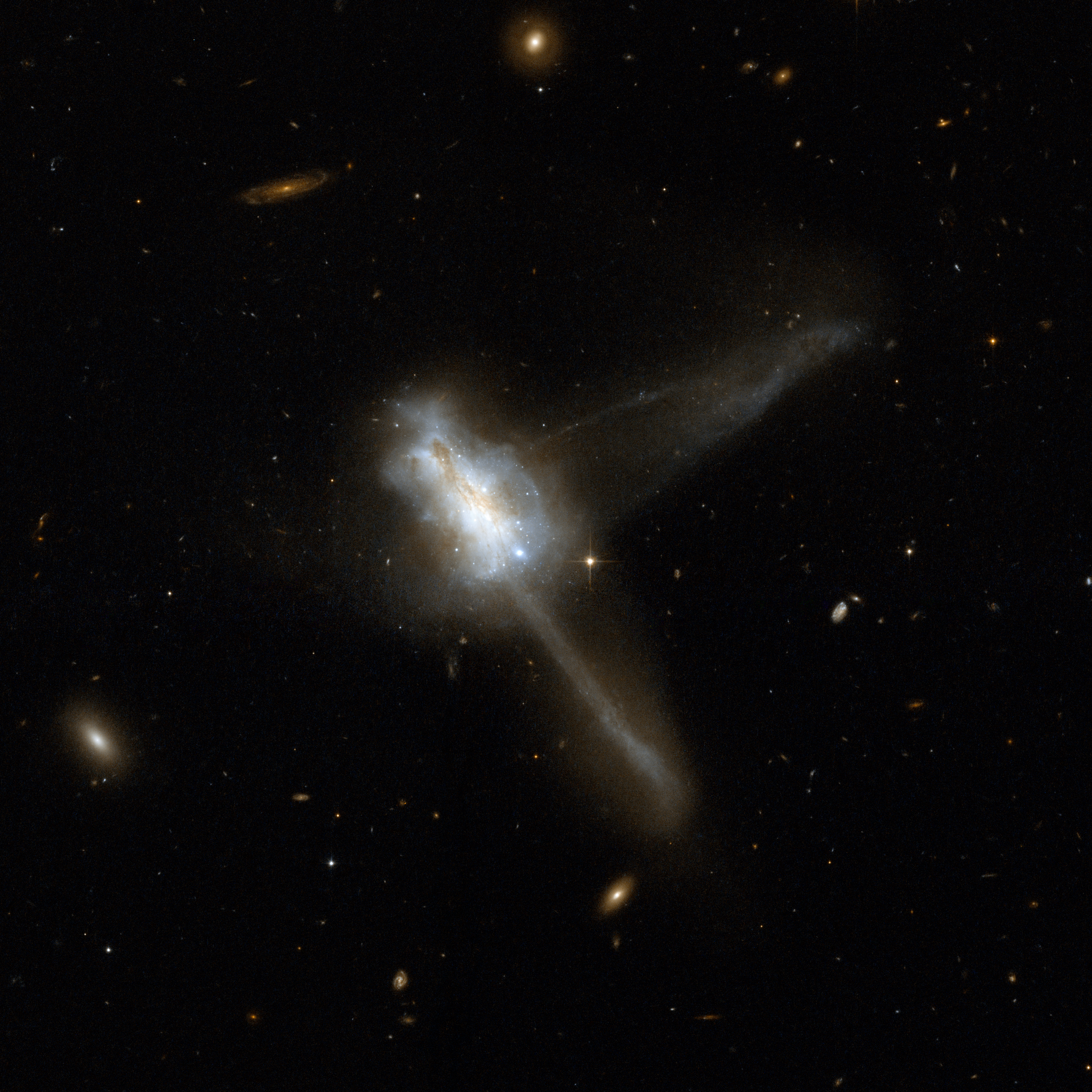
- Interacting Galaxy IC 883

Observation data (J2000.0 epoch)
- Constellation: Canes Venatici
- Right ascension: 13^{h} 20^{m} 35,5^{s}
- Declination: +34° 8′ 19″
- Redshift: 6954 ± 16 km/s
- Distance: 320.9 Mly (98.4 Mpc)
- Apparent magnitude (V): 13.8

Characteristics
- Type: Irr (Im/P)
- Apparent size (V): 2′.4 × 0′.7
- Notable features: Interacting galaxies

Other designations
- Arp 193 • UGC 8387 • PRC D-25 • IRAS 13183+3423 • PGC 46560 • VV 821 • ZWG 189.54 • 1ZW 56 • CGCG 189-54

IC 883 (also known as Arp 193, IRAS 13183+3423, PGC 46560 and UGC 8387) is an irregular galaxy that is about 321 million light years away from Earth. It is located in the constellation Canes Venatici. Its largest radius is 1.4 (131 thousand light years), and smallest 0.7 angular minutes (65 thousand light years).^{[b]} It was discovered by Rudolf Ferdinand Spitaler on May 1, 1891.

IC 883 is classified a luminous infrared galaxy (LIRG). It is a recent merger given that the galaxy has one single nucleus and two tidal tails. The molecular gas measured in IC 883 is estimated 4 billion M_{Θ}. It is known to show a radio jet originating from its nucleus travelling at a subluminal motion of 0.6-1 c.

== Supernovae ==
Two supernovae have been observed in IC 883:

- SN 2010cu (Type II, mag. 17.7) was discovered by S. Mattila and E. Kankare on 24 February 2010.
- SN 2011hi (Type II, mag. 17.9) was discovered by E. Kankare, S. Ryder, and S. Mattila on 11 February 2011.

When observed in near-infrared or optical wavelengths, they are the nearest supernovae found to the nucleus of an LIRG.

== Literature ==
- Steinicke, Wolfgang (2007), Jakiel, Richard (ed.), Galaxies and How to Observe Them, Springer, ISBN 978-1-85233-752-0
- R. J. Buta; H. G. Corwin, Jr.; S. C. Odewahn (2007). The de Vaucouleurs Atlas of Galaxies. Cambridge: Cambridge University. ISBN 978-0-521-82048-6.
- Sinnott, R. W. (1988). NGC 2000.0: The Complete New General Catalogue and Index Catalogues of Nebulae and Star Clusters. Sky Publishing. ISBN 978-0-933346-51-2.
