= NGC 7101 =

Galaxy in the constellation Pegasus

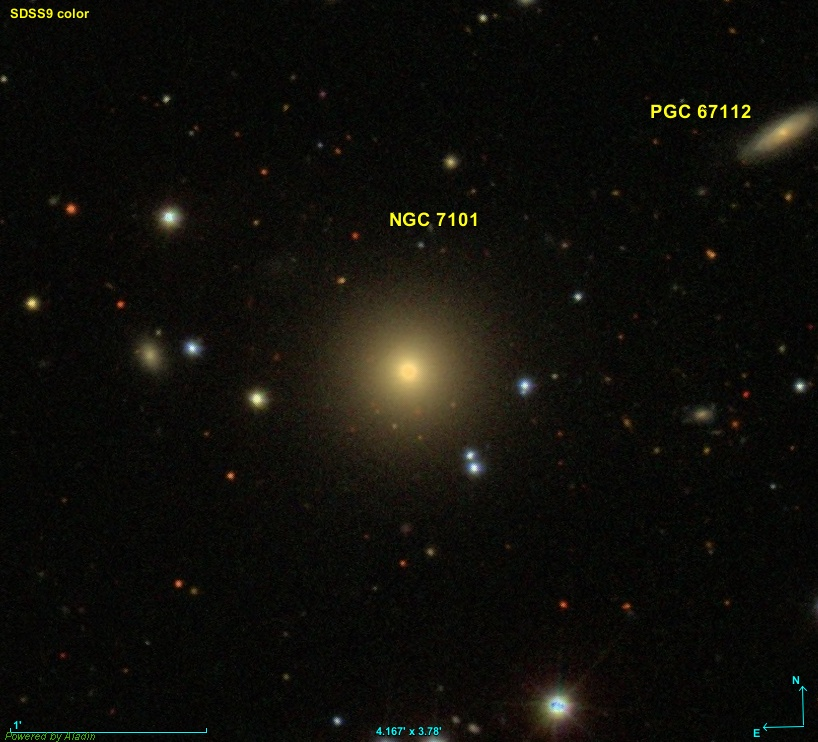
- NGC 7101 imaged by SDSS

Observation data (J2000 epoch)
- Constellation: Pegasus
- Right ascension: 21^{h} 39^{m} 34.6127^{s}
- Declination: +08° 52′ 36.832″
- Redshift: 0.028410±0.000100
- Heliocentric radial velocity: 8,517±30 km/s
- Distance: 393.3 ± 27.6 Mly (120.58 ± 8.47 Mpc)
- Apparent magnitude (V): 14.7

Characteristics
- Type: cE
- Size: ~135,300 ly (41.48 kpc) (estimated)
- Apparent size (V): 0.6′ × 0.6′

Other designations
- 2MASX J21393460+0852366, MCG +01-55-007, PGC 67118, CGCG 402-012

NGC 7101 is a compact elliptical galaxy in the constellation of Pegasus. Its velocity with respect to the cosmic microwave background is 8,176±38 km/s, which corresponds to a Hubble distance of 393.3 ± 27.6 Mly (120.58 ± 8.47 Mpc). It was discovered by German astronomer Albert Marth on 3 August 1864.

Austrian astronomer Rudolf Ferdinand Spitaler also observed this galaxy, but he thought that it was NGC 7100, which is a star in the Milky Way. This error has been reproduced in some databases, such as SIMBAD.

== Supernovae ==
Two supernovae have been observed in NGC 7101:

- SN 2018enb (Type Ia, mag. 16.7) was discovered by Kōichi Itagaki on 2 August 2018.
- SN 2025upj (Type Ia, mag. 17.858) was discovered by ATLAS on 13 August 2025.

== See also ==
- List of NGC objects (7001–7840)
