= IC 1481 =

Galaxy in the constellation Pisces

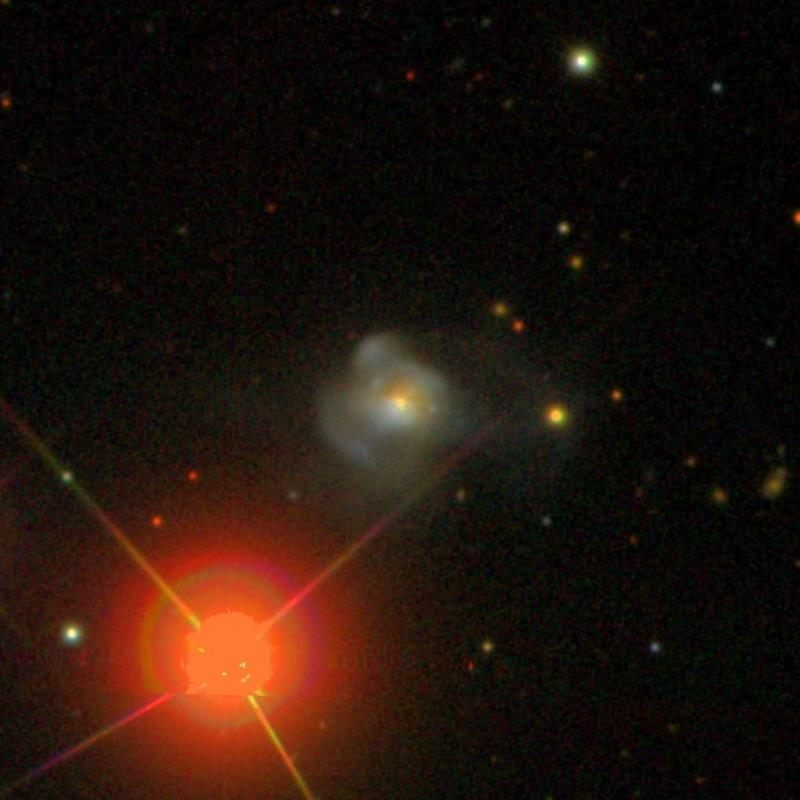
- IC 1481 captured by SDSS

Observation data (J2000 epoch)
- Constellation: Pisces
- Right ascension: 23^{h} 19^{m} 25.1234^{s}
- Declination: +05° 54′ 22.243″
- Redshift: 0.020331
- Heliocentric radial velocity: 6,095 km/s
- Distance: 289 Mly (88.60 Mpc)
- Apparent magnitude (V): 0.25
- Apparent magnitude (B): 0.33

Characteristics
- Type: Sb, LINER
- Size: 65,000 ly
- Apparent size (V): 0.8' × 0.7'

Other designations
- IRAS 23168+0537, UGC 12505, PGC 71070, CGCG 406-064

IC 1481 is a spiral galaxy located in the constellation Pisces. It is located 289 million light years from Earth and was discovered by Austrian astronomer, Rudolf Spitaler on October 6, 1891. The galaxy has an approximate diameter of 65,000 light years with a surface brightness of 12.8 square arcmin.

According to an optical image, IC 1481 has an Sb morphological classification. The galaxy also contains an active galactic nucleus (AGN). It is classified as a LINER galaxy. showing an extensive narrow-line region. The region of IC 1481 has bright portions forming in a figure eight pattern and extends at Position Angle (PA) = 50° by ~ 13 arcseconds on both sides of its nucleus. It also show emission knots towards the field edges. The stellar population of IC 1481 shows a post-starburst signature, which the Balmer lines contain strong absorption.

A luminous H_{2}O maser emission is found towards IC 1481. The spectrum of the maser has a narrow and strong feature of 0.15 Jy and FWHM = 2 km s^{−1}. It is also weak and broad. With an isotropic luminosity of L = 320 L_{Θ}, this suggests a megamaser.

The maser features are found distributed, which they contain a velocity gradient. This suggests the AGN of IC 1481 has an unstable molecular gas disk with a mass of (4.3 ± 0.3) × 10^{7} M_{Θ}. The disk is seen edge-on. It has a thickness of 2H = 1.5-4.2 pc and a radius of r = 2.8-14.0 pc making the largest amongst other maser disks observed in other AGNs. Not to mention, the disk has a rotation of V_{rot} = 124–168 km s^{−1} and a velocity dispersion measured by △V ≈ 31 km s^{−1}. Further observations found the disk of IC 1481 is huge indicated by its rotation curve being a sub-Keplerian. When compared to the galaxy's black hole mass of <10^{7} M_{Θ}, its mass is higher.

One supernova has been observed in IC 1481: SN 2000ey (type Ia, mag. 16.2).
