= IC 486 =

Spiral galaxy in the constellation of Gemini

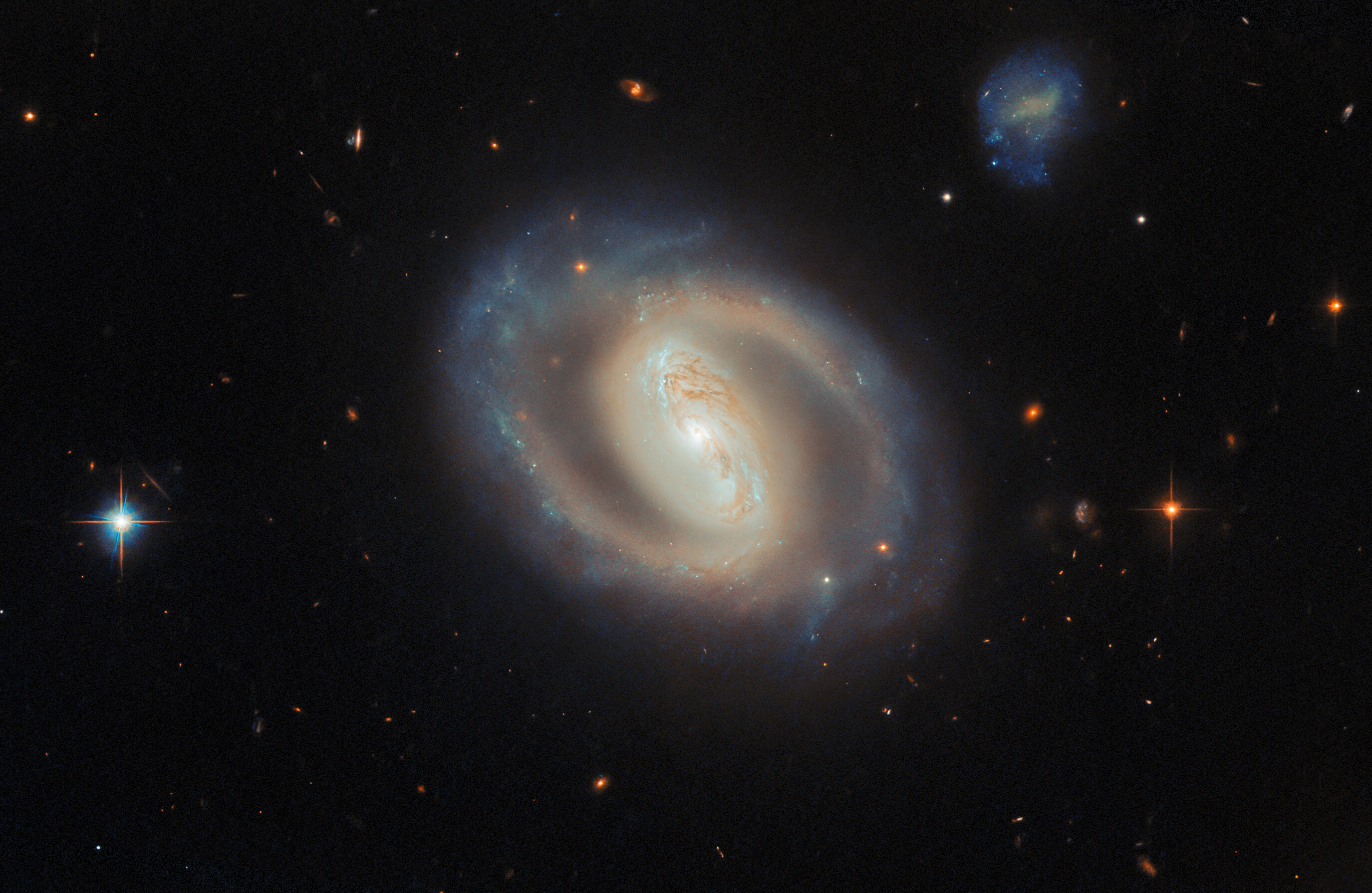
- Hubble Space Telescope image of IC 486, the blue galaxy at upper right side is SDSS J080018.78+263611.3

Observation data (J2000.0 epoch)
- Constellation: Gemini
- Right ascension: 08^{h} 00^{m} 20.9764^{s}
- Declination: +26° 36′ 48.623″
- Redshift: 0.026738 ± 6.45
- Distance: 380 Mly
- Apparent magnitude (V): 13.7
- Apparent magnitude (B): 14.6
- Surface brightness: 13.0

Characteristics
- Type: SBa

Other designations
- 2MASX J08002097+2636483, IC 486, UGC 4155, LEDA 22445, MCG +04-19-018, CGCG 148-087, SDSS J080020.98+263648.7

IC 486 is a barred spiral galaxy located approximately 380 million light-years from Earth in the constellation of Gemini. IC 486 is a Type I Seyfert galaxy, being a bright source of ultraviolet and X-rays in addition to the visible light emitted from its core. IC 486 was discovered by Austrian astronomer Rudolf Ferdinand Spitaler on 6 March 1891.

== Characteristics ==
In optical images, the pale luminous center is dominated by older stars, while the bluish regions in the disk indicate sites of more recent star formation. Dark dust lanes trace regions rich in molecular gas. The galaxy's structure is typical of barred spirals, where the central bar influences gas flows and spiral arm formation.

At the center of IC 486 is a supermassive black hole with a mass exceeding 100 million times that of the Sun. This powers a bright active galactic nucleus (AGN), visible as a striking white glow that outshines surrounding starlight. The AGN arises from an accretion disk of gas and dust feeding the black hole, producing intense radiation, including X-rays.

== Gallery ==
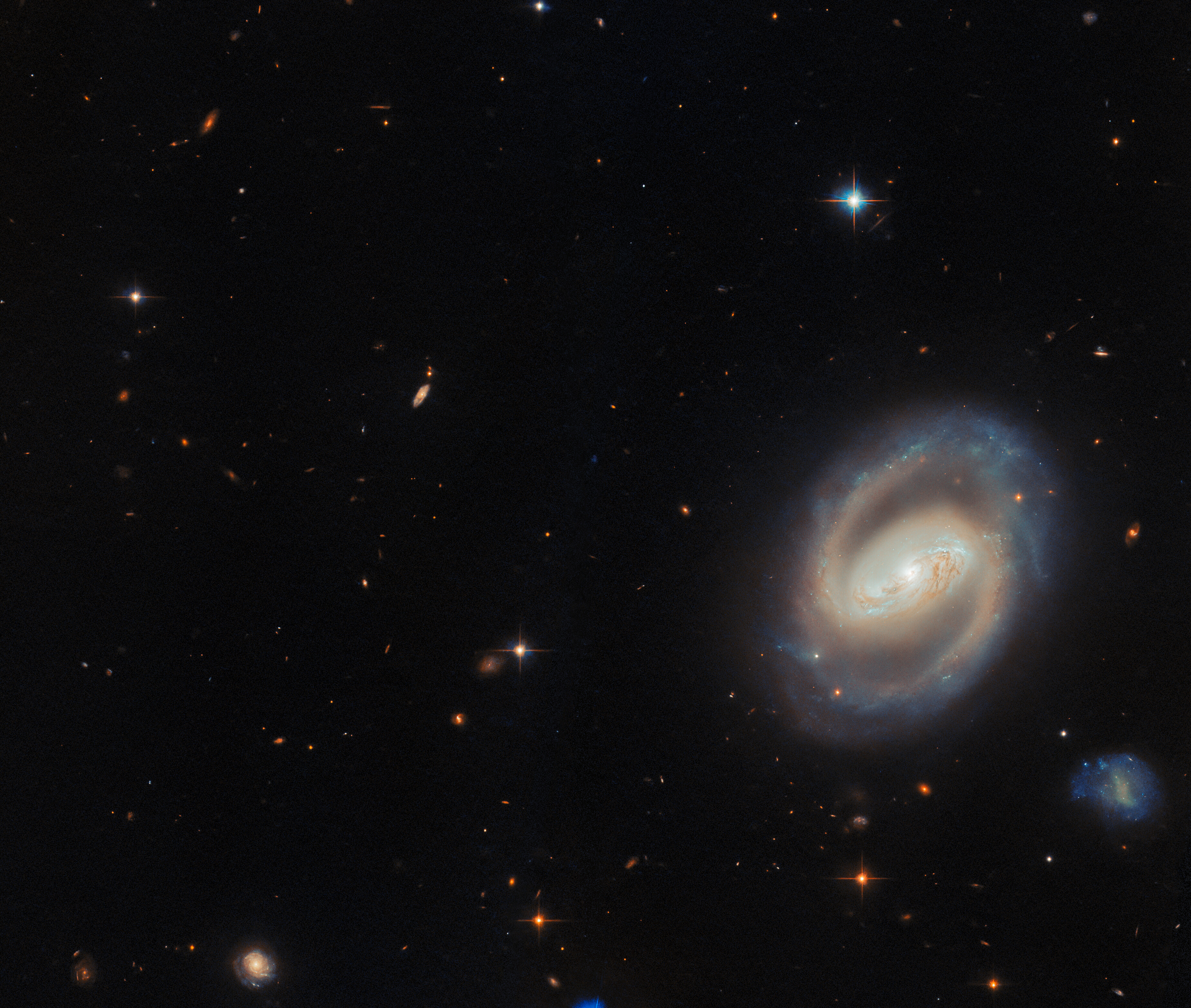
Hubble Space Telescope Wide-field view image of IC 486

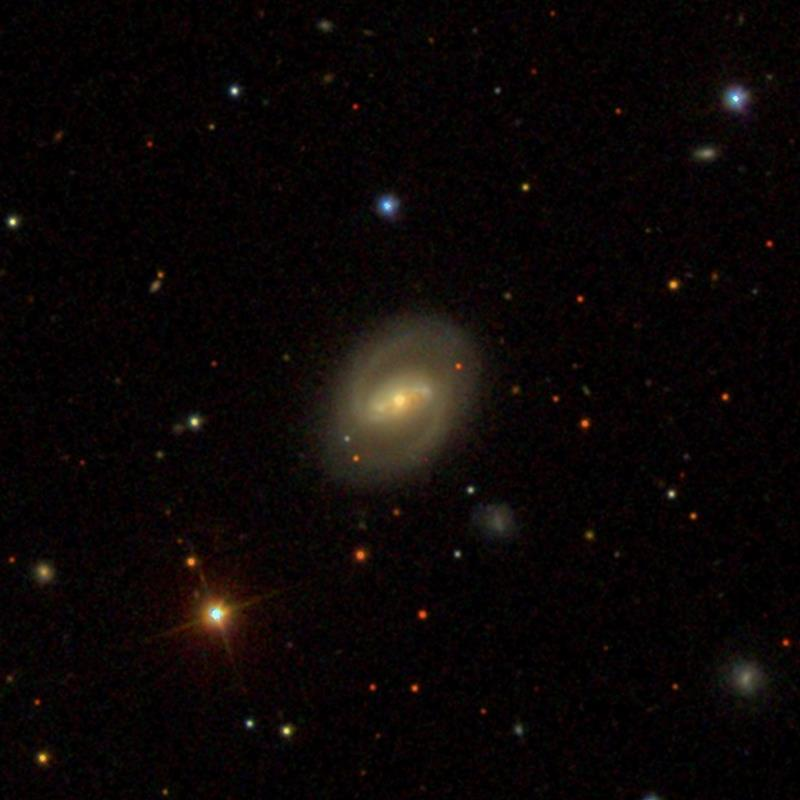
SDSS image of IC 486
