= IC 485 =

Spiral galaxy in the constellation Gemini

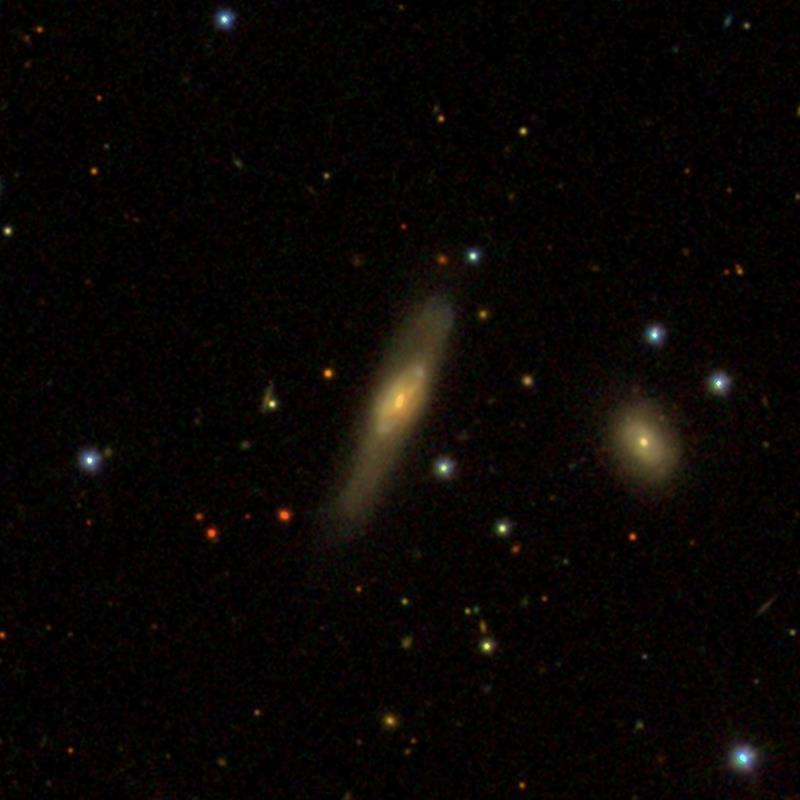
- IC 485 captured by SDSS

Observation data (J2000 epoch)
- Constellation: Gemini
- Right ascension: 08^{h} 00^{m} 19.75^{s}
- Declination: +26° 42′ 04.99″
- Redshift: 0.027827
- Heliocentric radial velocity: 8,342 km/s
- Distance: 375 Mly (114.97 Mpc)
- Apparent magnitude (V): 0.13
- Apparent magnitude (B): 0.17

Characteristics
- Type: Sa, AGN
- Size: 135,000 ly
- Apparent size (V): 1.35' × 0.32'

Other designations
- UGC 4156, PGC 22443, IRAS 07572+2650

IC 485 is a spiral galaxy located in the constellation of Gemini, located 375 million light years from Earth. It was discovered by the Austrian astronomer, Rudolf Spitaler on March 6, 1891. It has an estimated diameter of 1.35' × 0.32' arcmin, meaning the galaxy is about 135,000 light years across.

IC 485 is a candidate disc-maser galaxy. It has a projected distance of 122.0 ± 8.5 megaparsecs. The morphology classification of the galaxy is Sa, and it has a low luminous active galactic nucleus (AGN) of L_{X} ~ 5 × 10^{42} erg s^{−1}. The AGN activity of IC 485 has been debated. It is either classified a LINER or a Seyfert type II galaxy. But its high X-ray luminosity seems to confirm the latter.

Using the Karl G. Jansky Very Large Array observations, a team of astronomers led by Jeremy Darling discovered a H_{2}O maser containing a broad multi-component. The maser of IC 485 has a peak flux of 80 mJy with an isotopic luminosity of L_{iso} = (868 ± 46)L_{Θ}. According to Darling, he was also able to find a faint unresolved radio source with its angular resolution measured as 90 milliarcseconds ≈ 50 parsecs.

In 2022, the galaxy was further studied by another team of astronomers. They discovered, it has two other 22 GHz H_{2}O maser modules with a velocity separation of 472 km s^{−1}. One is located in the central nuclear region while the other is at a redshifted velocity. Based on estimations on its connection with an edge-on disc, IC 485 has a mass of M_{BH} ~ 1.2 × 10^{7} M_{Θ}. According to estimation of its black hole, the galaxy has a core luminosity of 1 × 10^{36} - 5 × 10^{37} erg s^{−1}.
