= NGC 6934 =

Globular cluster in the constellation Delphinus

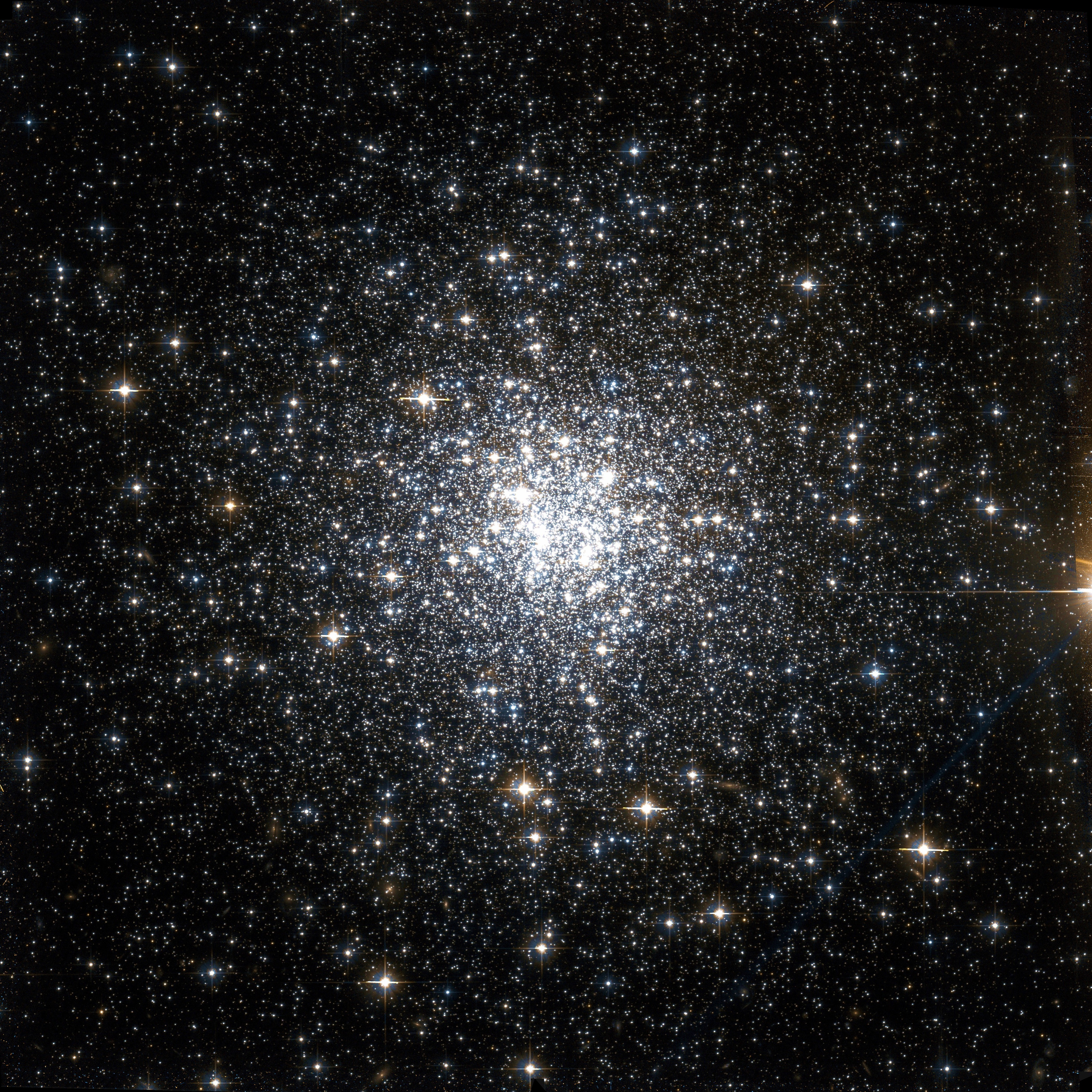
- NGC 6934 by Hubble Space Telescope; 3.5′ view

Observation data (J2000 epoch)
- Class: VIII
- Constellation: Delphinus
- Right ascension: 20^{h} 34^{m} 11.37^{s}
- Declination: +07° 24′ 16.1″
- Distance: 52 kly (16 kpc)
- Apparent magnitude (V): 8.83
- Apparent dimensions (V): 1.20′

Physical characteristics
- Absolute magnitude: −7.65
- Mass: 2.95×10^{5} M_{☉}
- Metallicity: [Fe/H] = –1.47 dex
- Other designations: Caldwell 47, NGC 6934

NGC 6934 (also known as Caldwell 47) is a globular cluster of stars in the northern constellation of Delphinus, about 52 kilolight-years distant from the Sun. It was discovered by the German-born astronomer William Herschel on 24 September 1785. The cluster is following a highly eccentric orbit (with an eccentricity of 0.81) through the Milky Way along an orbital plane that is inclined by 73° to the galactic plane. It may share a common dynamic origin with NGC 5466. As of 2018, it has been poorly studied.

This appears to be a Oosterhoff type I cluster with an intermediate metallicity. It has an Shapley–Sawyer Concentration Class of VIII, with a core radius of 15″ and a half-light radius of 36″. The estimated mass is 295,000 times the mass of the Sun. The cluster displays photometric anomalies, with a split subgiant branch on the HR diagram. Searches for variable stars have discovered 85 in the cluster field, of which 79 are of the RR Lyrae class and one is a SX Phe variable. There is some evidence for a tidal tail.
