= IPTF14atg =

Supernova event of May 2015 in constellation Coma Berenices

iPTF14atg
- Ia
- Discovered: 3 May 2015
- Distance: 300 Mly (92 Mpc)
- Host: IC 831
- Progenitor type: White dwarf
- Other designations: iPTF 14atg

iPTF14atg was a Type Ia supernova discovered on 3 May 2015. The supernova is located in galaxy IC 831, some 300 Mly (92 Mpc) distant. The supernova is thought to have ignited on May 2 or 3. The supernova's shockwave slammed into a companion star, shocking it into producing an ultraviolet pulse. The companion star that was hit is suspected to be a red giant star. This detection of the UV signal represents the first time the collision event of a supernova shockwave upon a companion star has been detected. The supernova was discovered by the Intermediate Palomar Transient Factory (iPTF), a successor to the earlier Palomar Transient Factory, and based at the Palomar Observatory in California. The data was processed by collaborators in Europe, that lead to the supernova discovery.

This single-degenerate white dwarf with normal star binary system represents one of two mechanisms for producing a Type Ia supernova, the other being double-degenerate two white dwarf binary stars.
