= NGC 6891 =

Planetary Nebula in constellation Delphinus

Nebula
- Planetary nebula
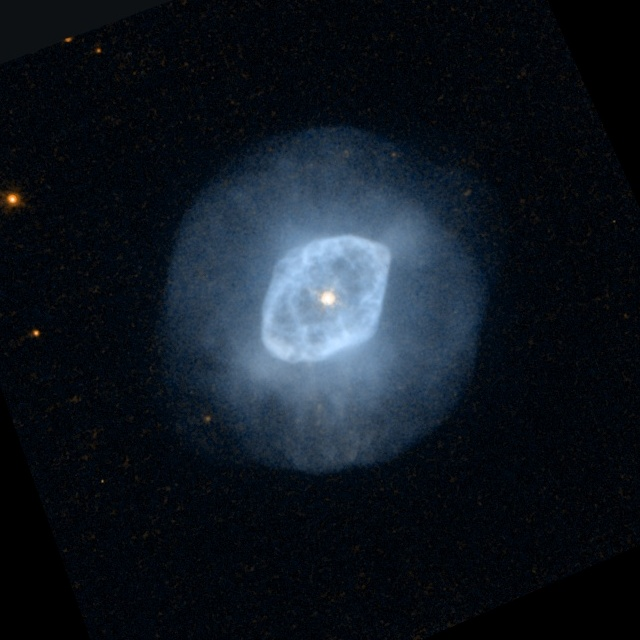
- Hubble Space Telescope image of NGC 6891

Observation data: J2000.0 epoch
- Right ascension: 20^{h} 15^{m} 08.84^{s}
- Declination: +12° 42′ 15.6″
- Distance: 12,400 ly
- Apparent magnitude (V): 12.51±0.23
- Constellation: Delphinus
- Designations: PN G054.1-12.1, PK 54-12.1, IRAS 20127+1233

NGC 6891 is a bright, asymmetrical planetary nebula located in the northern constellation of Delphinus. It was discovered on 22 September 1884, by Scottish astronomer Ralph Copeland, who observed it using visual spectroscopy with a 6.1-inch refractor at the Dun Echt Observatory in Aberdeen, Scotland.

== Characteristics ==
NGC 6891 displays a triple-shell structure, consisting of a bright inner nebula, an attached intermediate shell, and a detached outer halo. High-resolution imaging reveals filaments, knots, and intricate details in the interior surrounding the central white dwarf star named HD 192563, along with at least two ellipsoidal shells oriented differently and a spherical outer halo expanding faster than the inner regions. The bright optical regions have an apparent diameter of approximately 15 arcseconds. The nebula shows evidence of multiple mass ejection episodes from its progenitor star.

== Observation ==
NGC 6891 has an apparent visual magnitude of around 10.5 to 12 and appears as a small, bluish disc in amateur telescopes of 6 inches (150 mm) aperture or larger, with the central star faintly visible under good conditions. It lies near the celestial equator in Delphinus and is observable from both hemispheres. The nebula has been imaged in detail by the Hubble Space Telescope, contributing to studies of planetary nebula structure, formation, evolution, and distance determination.
