= 113P/Spitaler =

Periodic comet

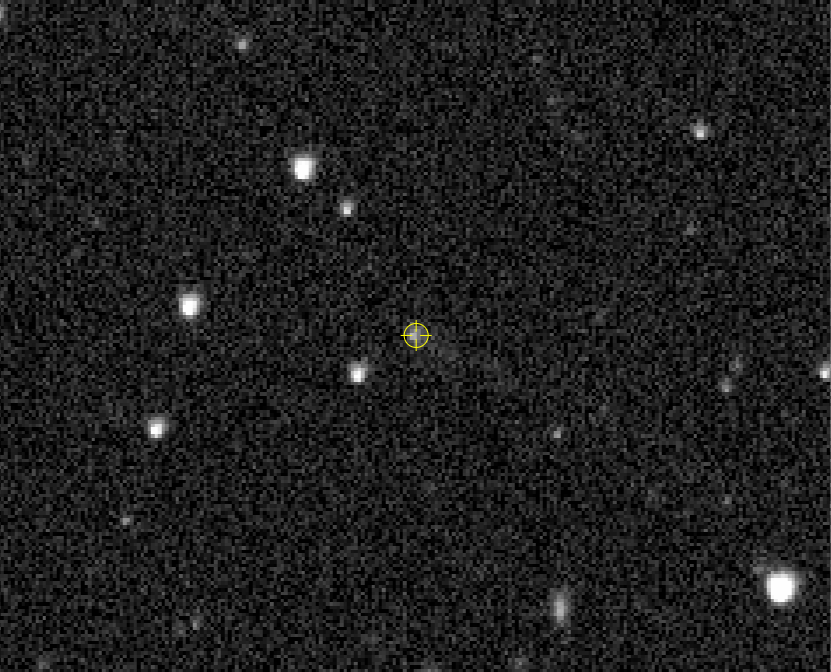
- Spitaler's Comet as seen from the Zwicky Transient Facility on 1 December 2022

Discovery
- Discovered by: Rudolf Ferdinand Spitaler
- Discovery site: Vienna, Austria
- Discovery date: 17 November 1890

Designations
- MPC designation: P/1890 W1, P/1993 U2
- Alternative designations: 1890 VII, 1994 III; 1890f, 1993r

Orbital characteristics
- Epoch: 31 March 2024 (JD 2460400.5)
- Observation arc: 132.41 years (Note: Observation arc from the Minor Planet Center database covering dates from 17 November 1890 until 15 April 2023.)
- Number of observations: 1,022
- Aphelion: 5.246 AU
- Perihelion: 2.143 AU
- Semi-major axis: 3.694 AU
- Eccentricity: 0.41994
- Orbital period: 7.101 years
- Inclination: 5.775°
- Longitude of ascending node: 306.66°
- Argument of periapsis: 115.63°
- Mean anomaly: 92.763°
- Last perihelion: 1 June 2022
- Next perihelion: 11 July 2029
- T_{Jupiter}: 2.929
- Earth MOID: 1.138 AU
- Jupiter MOID: 0.477 AU

Physical characteristics
- Mean radius: 1.15 km (0.71 mi)
- Comet total magnitude (M1): 14.7
- Comet nuclear magnitude (M2): 19.6

Comet Spitaler is a Jupiter-family comet with a 7.1-year orbit around the Sun. It is the only comet discovered by Austrian astronomer, Rudolf Ferdinand Spitaler.

== Observational history ==
=== 1890 apparition and discovery ===
While attempting to observe C/1890 V1 (Zona), which was just discovered about two days earlier, Rudolf Ferdinand Spitaler spotted a new comet on the night of 17 November 1890. He described it as a very nebulous object positioned very close on where Zona's Comet was predicted to be, albeit fainter than the latter. Both comets were found within the constellation Auriga. (Note: Spitaler's Comet was reportedly discovered at the following coordinates: α = 5^{h} 27.3^{m} , δ = 33° 37′)

It was last detected on 4 February 1891, when Spitaler described it as very faint and diffuse. (Note: Final reported position in 1891 were: α = 5^{h} 04.6^{m} , δ = 39° 56′)

=== Loss and recovery ===
Spitaler, together with George Mary Searle, James Francis Tennant, and John Russell Hind, calculated orbits based on the observations, but despite predictions of a return in 1897, it was lost and remained so for the next 102 years. Around this time, the comet made two close approaches to Jupiter between 1947 and 1983, at distances of 1.318 AU (197.2 million km) and 0.401 AU (60.0 million km), respectively.

On 24 October 1993, the comet was rediscovered by James Vernon Scotti from the Spacewatch survey. It was confirmed as the same object as Spitaler's Comet when Brian G. Marsden calculated its orbit and connected its 1890 and 1994 apparitions. It was then subsequently observed on every apparition up to the present day.

== Physical characteristics ==
Photometric observations of the comet until 2000 revealed that the nucleus of Spitaler's Comet has an effective radius of around 1.15 km (0.71 mi).

== Notes ==
Numbered comets
Previous; 112P/Urata–Niijima	113P/Spitaler	Next; 114P/Wiseman–Skiff
