= Kiyotaka Kanai =

Japanese astronomer

Minor planets discovered: 1
7752 Otauchunokai	31 October 1988	MPC
co-discovery with Tsuneo Niijima

Kiyotaka Kanai (金井 清高, Kanai Kiyotaka; born 1951) is a Japanese amateur astronomer, observer of variable stars, discoverer of comet C/1970 B1, and co-discoverer of the main-belt asteroid 7752 Otauchunokai, named after the Ota Uchuno Kai group, an amateur astronomers' club at Ōta city, of which he is a member of.

The inner main-belt asteroid 26168 Kanaikiyotaka was named after him on 21 September 2002 (M.P.C. 46684).
