= NGC 6541 =

Globular cluster in the constellation Corona Australis

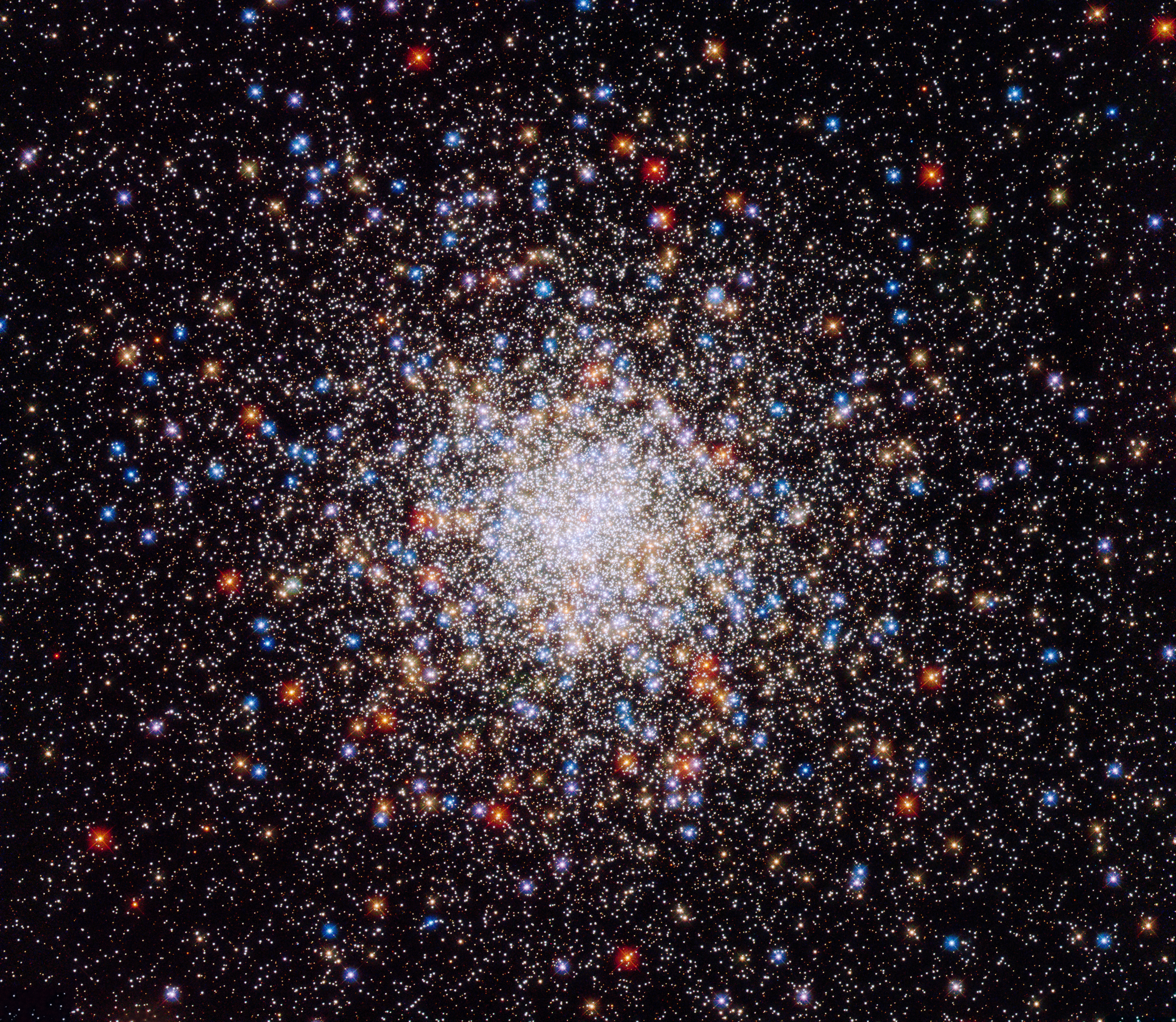
- NGC 6541, imaged by the Hubble Space Telescope

Observation data (J2000 epoch)
- Class: III
- Constellation: Corona Australis
- Right ascension: 18^{h} 08^{m} 02.36^{s}
- Declination: –43° 42′ 53.6″
- Distance: 24.8 ± 0.3 kly (7.6 ± 0.1 kpc)
- Apparent magnitude (V): 6.3
- Apparent dimensions (V): 15′

Physical characteristics
- Mass: 5.72×10^{5} M_{☉}
- Metallicity: [Fe/H] = –1.53 dex
- Estimated age: 12.93 Gyr
- Other designations: NGC 6541, Caldwell 78

NGC 6541 (also known as Caldwell 78 or the Cacciatore Cluster) is a globular cluster of stars in the southern constellation of Corona Australis. The globular cluster was discovered by Niccolò Cacciatore at the Palermo Astronomical Observatory, Sicily, on March 19, 1826. It was independently found by James Dunlop on July 3, 1826. The cluster has an apparent visual magnitude of 6.3 and an angular diameter of 15′. It is visible with binoculars or a small telescope.

Located at a distance of 24.8 kly (7.6 kpc) from the Sun, it is orbiting within the central region of the Milky Way about 7.2 kly (2.2 kpc) from the Galactic Center. It is considered a metal-poor inner halo cluster, being the third most metal-poor globular cluster within 9.8 kly (3 kpc) of the center. The cluster has 5.72×10^{5} times the mass of the Sun. It is estimated to be around 12.9 billion years old, and is believed to have undergone core collapse. A total of 94 blue straggler members have been identified, as well as three W Ursae Majoris and nine SX Phoenicis variables.
