= Temistocle Zona =

Italian astronomer

Temistocle Zona (7 May 1848 – 2 May 1910) was an Italian astronomer.

Born in Porto Tolle, in 1870 Zona graduated in architecture at the University of Padua, and he was a volunteer assistant at the Observatory of that city from 1868 to 1871. In October 1880, he entered the staff of Gaetano Cacciatore at the Observatory of Palermo, and in 1891 he became the director of the Observatory, a role he held until 1898. In 1882, he became professor at the University of Palermo. He is best known as the discoverer of the comet C/1890 V1 Zona, on November 15, 1890.

He wrote about sixty works, mainly related to observations of comets, eclipses of the moon and meteors.
