= NGC 7006 =

Globular cluster in the constellation Delphinus

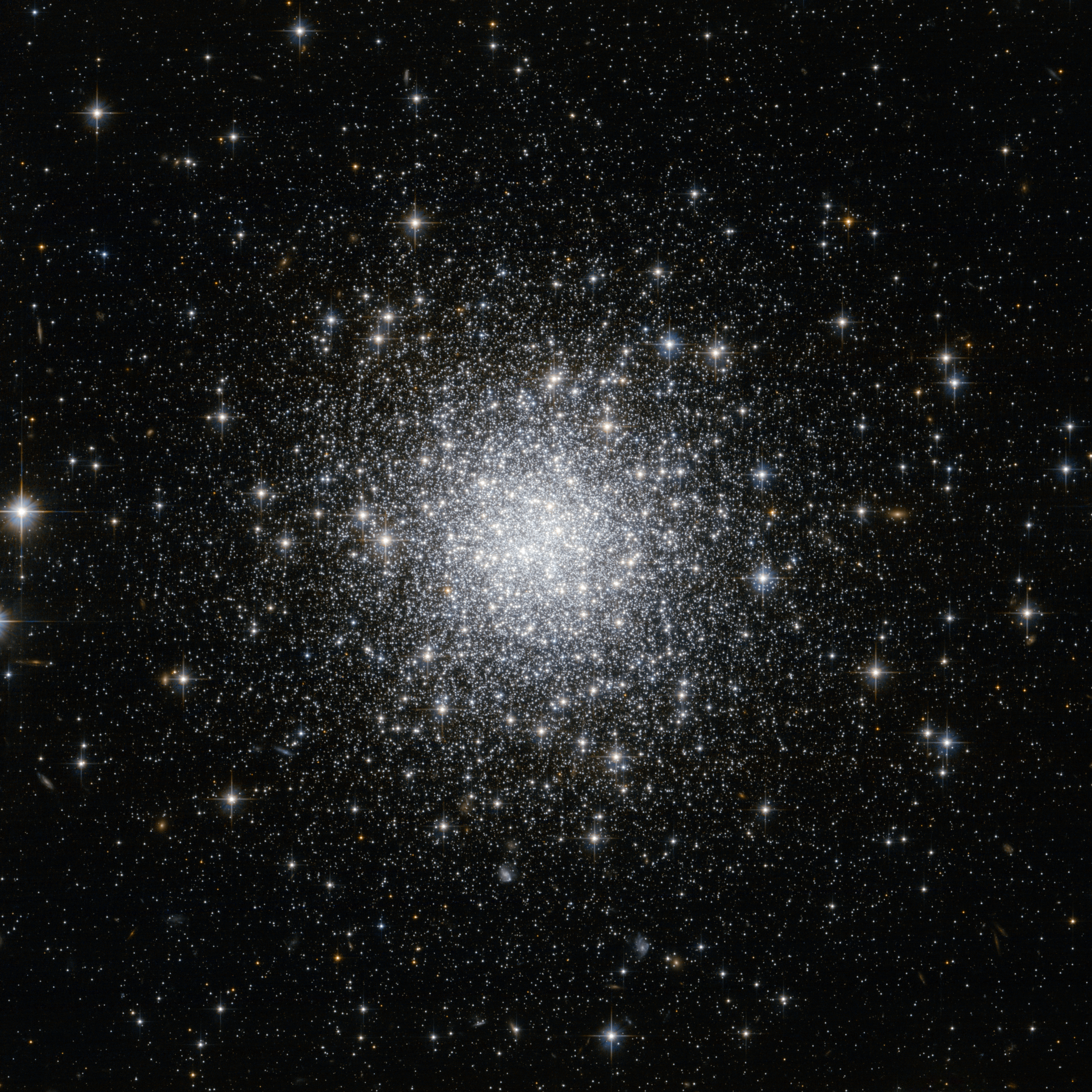
- Hubble image of NGC 7006

Observation data (J2000 epoch)
- Class: I
- Constellation: Delphinus
- Right ascension: 21^{h} 1^{m} 29.4^{s}
- Declination: +16° 11′ 14.4″
- Distance: 137×10^{3} ly (42 kpc)
- Apparent magnitude (V): 10.6
- Apparent dimensions (V): 2.8′

Physical characteristics
- Mass: 3.03×10^{5} M_{☉}
- Metallicity: [Fe/H] = –1.52 dex
- Other designations: Caldwell 42

NGC 7006 (also known as Caldwell 42) is a globular cluster in the constellation Delphinus. NGC 7006 resides in the outskirts of the Milky Way. It is about 135,000 light-years away, five times the distance between the Sun and the centre of the galaxy, and it is part of the galactic halo. This roughly spherical region of the Milky Way is made up of dark matter, gas and sparsely distributed stellar clusters.

NGC 7006 appears in the science fiction novel Beyond the Farthest Star by Edgar Rice Burroughs, where it is used as a point of reference by the inhabitants of the planet Poloda to determine the approximate location of Earth.

== Gallery ==
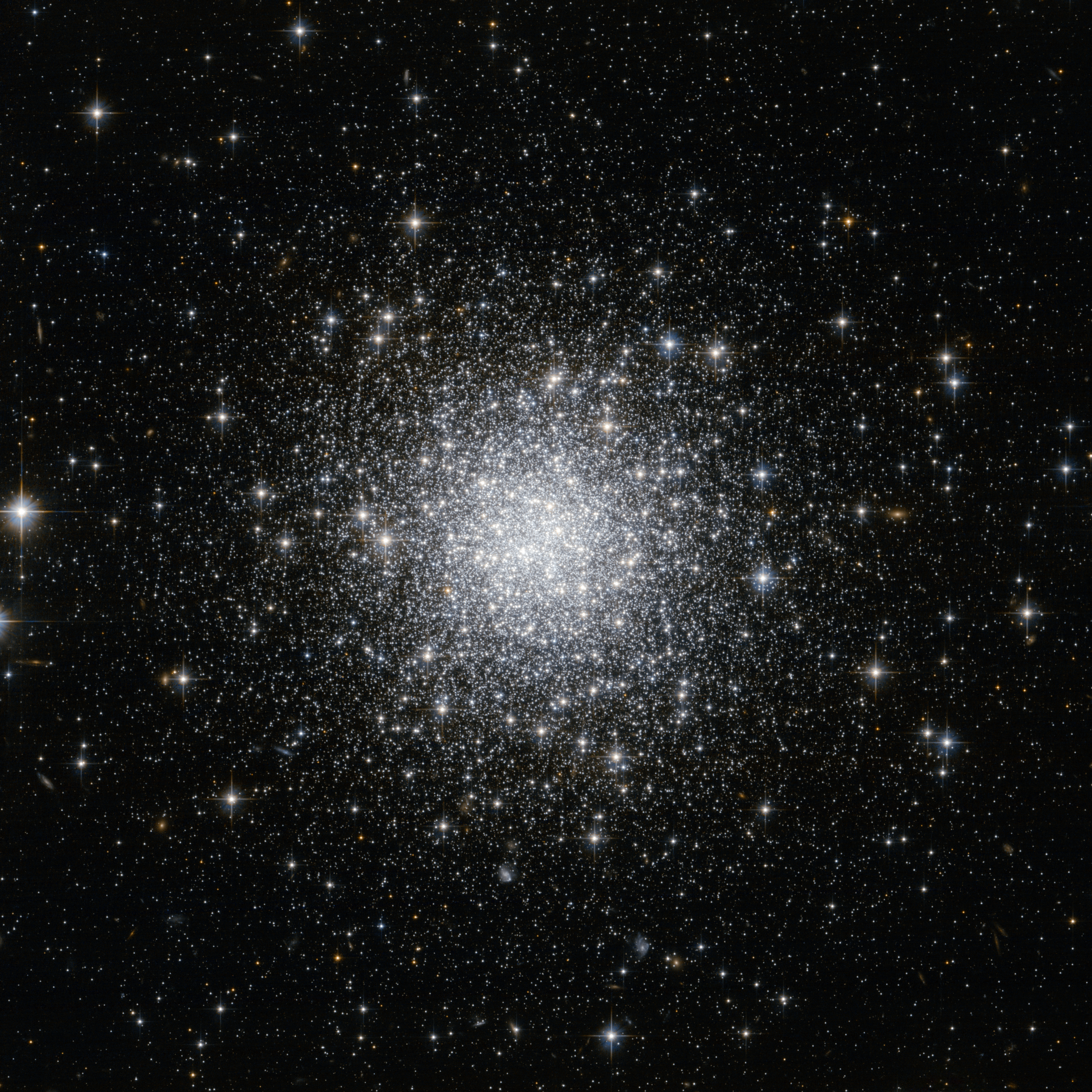
NGC 7006 imaged by Hubble's Advanced Camera for Surveys.

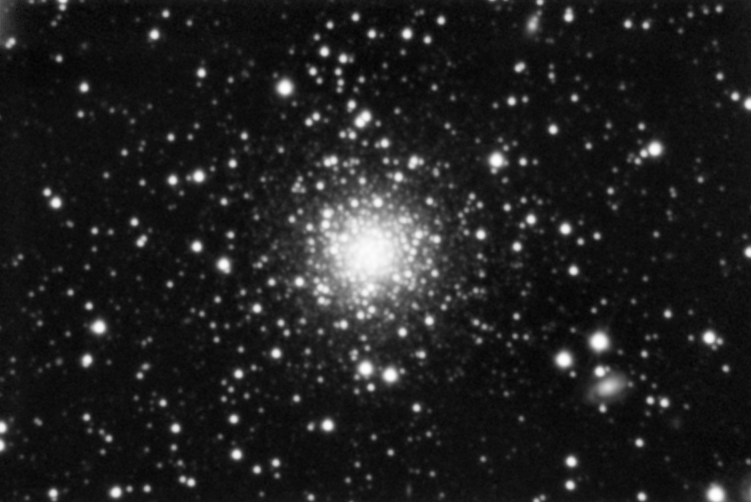
NGC 7006 imaged by an amateur telescope.
