= Tsuneo Niijima =

Japanese farmer and amateur astronomer

Minor planets discovered: 32
see § List of discovered minor planets

Tsuneo Niijima (新島 恒男, Niijima Tsuneo; born 1955) is a Japanese farmer and amateur astronomer.

He is a prolific discoverer of minor planets, credited by the Minor Planet Center with the discovery and co-discovery of 32 numbered minor planets between 1986 and 1996. He also co-discovered 112P/Urata-Niijima, a periodic comet of the Jupiter family in 1986.

The main-belt asteroid 5507 Niijima, discovered by Takeshi Urata and Kenzo Suzuki, was named in his honor. Naming citation was published on 1 September 1993 (M.P.C. 22510).

== List of discovered minor planets ==
3565 Ojima	22 December 1986	list^{[A]}
3585 Goshirakawa	28 January 1987	list^{[A]}
3686 Antoku	3 March 1987	list^{[A]}
4375 Kiyomori	28 February 1987	list^{[A]}
4376 Shigemori	20 March 1987	list^{[A]}
4377 Koremori	4 April 1987	list^{[A]}
4402 Tsunemori	25 February 1987	list^{[A]}
4574 Yoshinaka	20 December 1986	list^{[A]}
4767 Sutoku	4 April 1987	list^{[A]}
4896 Tomoegozen	20 December 1986	list^{[A]}
5578 Takakura	28 January 1987	list^{[A]}
5830 Simohiro	9 March 1991	list^{[A]}

5912 Oyatoshiyuki	20 December 1989	list^{[A]}
6158 Shosanbetsu	12 November 1991	list^{[A]}
7139 Tsubokawa	14 February 1994	list^{[A]}
7202 Kigoshi	19 February 1995	list^{[A]}
(7748) 1987 TA	12 October 1987	list^{[A]}
7752 Otauchunokai	31 October 1988	list^{[B]}
8344 Babette	25 January 1987	list^{[A]}
(8565) 1995 WB_{6}	24 November 1995	list^{[A]}
10162 Issunboushi	2 January 1995	list^{[A]}
10727 Akitsushima	25 February 1987	list^{[A]}
(13148) 1995 EF	1 March 1995	list^{[A]}
(17406) 1987 DO	25 February 1987	list^{[A]}

17472 Dinah	17 March 1991	list^{[A]}
(20999) 1987 BF	28 January 1987	list^{[A]}
(23476) 1990 VE_{4}	15 November 1990	list^{[A]}
26168 Kanaikiyotaka	24 November 1995	list
26170 Kazuhiko	24 January 1996	list
(39637) 1995 EG	1 March 1995	list^{[A]}
(39664) 1995 WW_{4}	20 November 1995	list^{[A]}
(58147) 1986 WK	29 November 1986	list^{[A]}
Co-discovery made with:^{A} T. Urata^{B} K. Kanai
