= Niccolò Cacciatore =

Italian astronomer

- Giuseppe Patania, Portrait of Niccolò Cacciatore, c. 1830, priv. col.
- Born: 26 January 1770; Casteltermini, Kingdom of Sicily
- Died: 28 January 1841 (aged 71); Palermo, Kingdom of the Two Sicilies
- Known for: Discovery of globular cluster NGC 6541
- Scientific career
- Fields: Astronomy
- Workplaces: Palermo Astronomical Observatory

Niccolò Cacciatore FRS (Italian: [nikkoˈlɔ kkattʃaˈtoːre]; 26 January 1770 – 28 January 1841) was an Italian astronomer.

== Biography ==
Cacciatore was born at Casteltermini, in Sicily. While studying mathematics and physics in Palermo, he became acquainted with Giuseppe Piazzi, head of the Palermo Astronomical Observatory, and became a graduate student assistant at the observatory in 1798. Two years later, in 1800, the year before Piazzi discovered Ceres, Cacciatore was formally put on staff.

Cacciatore helped Piazzi compile the second edition of the Palermo Star Catalogue (1814). He did the bulk of the work, in fact heading the project starting in 1807. He also published works on the comets of 1807 and 1819.

Cacciatore succeeded Piazzi as director of the Palermo Observatory in 1817. As such, his most notable observation was the discovery of globular cluster NGC 6541 on 19 March 1826. The observatory was attacked, and he was imprisoned, during the Sicilian Revolution of 1820, but he survived to restore the facility and lead it for two more decades.

In addition to astronomy, he was an expert on meteorology, and wrote a number of books on the subject. Further, after the political troubles of 1820, he served as a member of the legislature of the Kingdom of the Two Sicilies. Cacciatore was a fellow of the Royal Society of London and a member of the Accademia nazionale delle scienze. He was elected a Foreign Honorary Member of the American Academy of Arts and Sciences in 1837.

He married Emmanuela Martini in 1812, with whom he had five children. His son, Gaetano, succeeded him as director of the observatory.

== Sualocin and Rotanev ==
Niccolò Cacciatore, Della cometa apparsa in Luglio del 1819 Palermo, 1819

Alpha and Beta Delphini are a pair of visually unremarkable 4th magnitude stars. When the Palermo Catalogue was published in 1814, the unfamiliar names Sualocin and Rotanev were attached to them. Eventually the Reverend Thomas William Webb, a British astronomer, puzzled out the explanation. Cacciatore's name, Nicholas Hunter in English translation, would be Latinized to Nicolaus Venator. Reversing the letters of this construction produces the two star names. How Webb arrived at this explanation 45 years after the publication of the catalogue is still a mystery. It is unclear if (as is usually said) Cacciatore named the stars after himself as a practical joke, or if they were named by Piazzi in honor of his heir apparent or "dauphin", as a pun on the constellation of the dolphin. In 2016, the two names were approved as official by the International Astronomical Union (IAU).

== Works ==
- Cacciatore, Niccolò (1808). Della cometa apparsa in settembre del 1807: Osservazioni, e risultati. Palermo: Reale Stamperia.
- Cacciatore, Niccolò (1819). Della cometa apparsa in luglio del 1819: Osservazioni e risultati. Palermo: Reale Stamperia.
- Cacciatore, Niccolò (1832). Sul modo di ridurre ad unico sistema le osservazioni meteorologiche. Palermo: dalla Tipografia di Filippo Solli.

== See also ==
- James Dunlop
