= 112P/Urata–Niijima =

Periodic comet with 6 year orbit

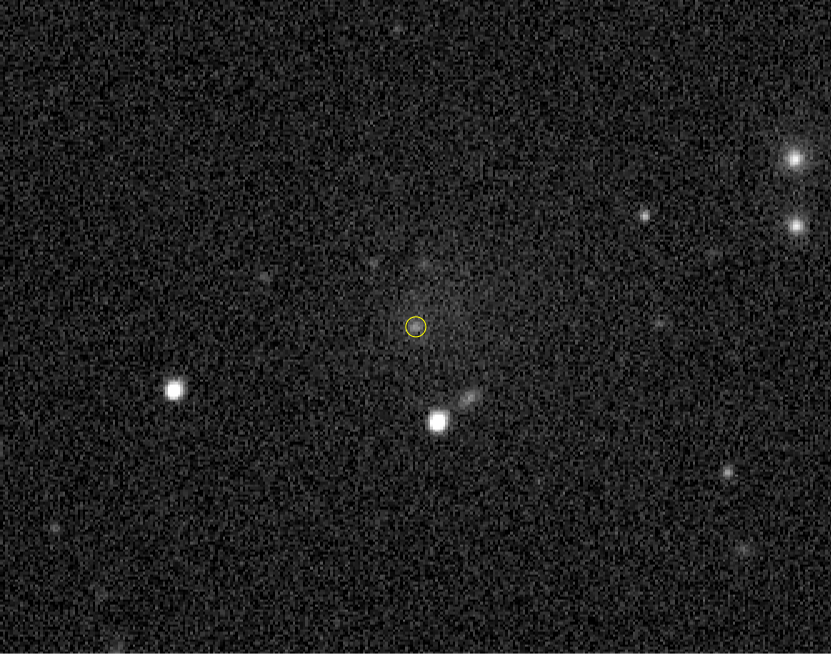
- Comet Urata–Niijima imaged from the Zwicky Transient Facility on 27 January 2020

Discovery
- Discovered by: Takeshi Urata; Tsuneo Niijima
- Discovery site: Ojima, Japan
- Discovery date: 30 October 1986

Designations
- MPC designation: P/1986 UD, P/1986 WP_{5}; P/1986 TD_{4}; P/1993 U1
- Alternative designations: 1986 XVI, 1993 XII; 1986o, 1993q

Orbital characteristics
- Epoch: 9 June 2026 (JD 2461200.5)
- Observation arc: 39.88 years (Note: Observation arc from the Minor Planet Center database covering dates from 4 October 1986 until 22 August 2026.)
- Earliest precovery date: 4 October 1986
- Number of observations: 653
- Aphelion: 5.601 AU
- Perihelion: 1.441 AU
- Semi-major axis: 3.521 AU
- Eccentricity: 0.59071
- Orbital period: 6.61 years
- Inclination: 24.204°
- Longitude of ascending node: 31.794°
- Argument of periapsis: 21.585°
- Mean anomaly: 344.36°
- Last perihelion: 21 September 2026
- Next perihelion: 3 April 2033
- T_{Jupiter}: 2.688
- Earth MOID: 0.481 AU
- Jupiter MOID: 0.316 AU

Physical characteristics
- Mean radius: 0.90±0.05 km
- Geometric albedo: 0.04
- Spectral type: (V–R) = 0.53±0.04
- Comet total magnitude (M1): 13.4
- Comet nuclear magnitude (M2): 17.9

Comet Urata–Niijima, also known as 112P/Urata–Niijima, is a Jupiter-family comet with a 6.6-year orbit around the Sun. It was the only comet discovered by Japanese astronomers Takeshi Urata and Tsuneo Niijima.

== Observational history ==
=== 1986 apparition ===
The comet was first spotted by Urata and Niijima as a fast-moving asteroid-like object called 1986 UD, on 30 October 1986. At the time, it was a 16th-magnitude object within the constellation Aries. (Note: Reported initial position upon discovery was: α = 2^{h} 03.2^{m} , δ = 19° 07′) Four days later, Tsutomu Seki would confirm the object's cometary nature after spotting a very faint, diffuse coma on 3 November 1986. Further observations by Miklós Lovas and orbital calculations by Brian G. Marsden determined the periodic nature of Urata–Niijima on 17 November 1986. Its brightness remained consistent at roughly 15–16 throughout the entire apparition. The comet was last observed by Tom Gehrels on 27 March 1987.

On August 1987, Shuichi Nakano would later link two asteroids, 1986 TD_{4} and 1986 WP_{5}, as the same object as Comet Urata–Niijima.

=== Subsequent apparitions ===
The comet was recovered by James V. Scotti at the Kitt Peak Observatory on 20 October 1993. As with the previous apparition in 1986, the comet never went brighter than apparent magnitude 15, and it was an extremely faint 22nd-magnitude object when it was last seen in April 1994. Philippe L. Lamy and Harold A. Weaver used the Hubble Space Telescope to recover the comet on its next apparition on 4 March 2000.

At the perihelion passage in late September 2026 the solar elongation will be 83 degrees with a declination of +34. The comet should brighten to about magnitude 15.5 placing it near the limit of smart telescopes.

== Physical characteristics ==
The nucleus of the comet has an effective radius of 0.90 ± 0.05 km (0.559 ± 0.031 mi), assuming a geometric albedo of 0.04. During its 1983 apparition, emissions of CN, C_{3} and C_{2} were detected from Urata–Niijima's coma.

== Bibliography ==
- Kronk, Gary W.; Meyer, Maik; Seargent, David A. J. (2017). Cometography: A Catalog of Comets. Vol. 6: 1983–1993. Cambridge University Press. ISBN 978-0-521-87216-4.

Numbered comets
Previous; 111P/Helin–Roman–Crockett	112P/Urata–Niijima	Next; 113P/Spitaler
