= Zeta Delphini =

Star in the constellation Delphinus

- Location of ζ Delphini (circled)

Observation data Epoch J2000 Equinox ICRS
- Constellation: Delphinus
- Right ascension: 20^{h} 35^{m} 18.53621^{s}
- Declination: +14° 40′ 27.1739″
- Apparent magnitude (V): +4.647

Characteristics
- Evolutionary stage: main sequence
- Spectral type: A3Va / L5
- U−B color index: +0.14
- B−V color index: +0.105

Astrometry
Radial velocity (R_{v})	−27.68±0.37 km/s
Proper motion (μ)	RA: 45.504 mas/yr Dec.: 11.510 mas/yr
Parallax (π)	14.9441±0.1284 mas
Distance	218 ± 2 ly (66.9 ± 0.6 pc)
Absolute bolometric magnitude (M_{bol})	0.523 / 14.59

Details

ζ Del A
Mass	2.5 ± 0.2 M_{☉}
Luminosity	48.63 ± 1.66 L_{☉}
Surface gravity (log g)	3.60±0.12 cgs
Temperature	8236±124 K
Metallicity [Fe/H]	−0.05 dex
Rotational velocity (v sin i)	108.0±3.6 km/s
Age	525 ± 125 Myr

ζ Del B
Mass	55 ± 10 M_{Jup}
Luminosity	0.00012 ± 0.00001 L_{☉}
Surface gravity (log g)	5.0+0.5 −1.0 cgs
Temperature	1550+250 −100 K
Age	525 ± 125 Myr

Other designations
- ζ Del, 4 Del, BD+14°4353, HD 196180, HIP 101589, HR 7871, SAO 106274

Database references
SIMBAD	ζ Del
- ζ Del B

Zeta Delphini is a star with a brown dwarf companion in the constellation of Delphinus. Its name is a Bayer designation that is Latinized from ζ Delphini and abbreviated Zeta Del or ζ Del. With an apparent visual magnitude of about 4.6, it is faintly visible to the naked eye. Parallax measurements of the system made by the Gaia spacecraft put it at a distance of about 218 light-years (67 parsecs). It is drifting closer with a line of sight velocity component of −27.7 km/s.

Zeta Delphini has a spectral type of A3V, presenting as an A-type main-sequence star. These types of stars are bluish-white colored, and have effective temperatures between 7100 and 11500 K: Zeta Delphini has a temperature of 8336 K. Its age is estimated to be around 500 million years, considerably younger than the Sun.

In 2014, the discovery of a brown dwarf companion orbiting Zeta Delphini was announced. Zeta Delphini B is a brown dwarf with a spectral type of L5 (but may be from L3 to L7), and has a mass of about 55 Jupiters. At over 13 arcseconds away, this brown dwarf is separated at least 910 AU from Zeta Delphini.

A 2021 study identified Zeta Delphini as a Lambda Boötis star, a type of star with peculiar chemical abundances. It is the first known Lambda Boötis star orbited by a brown dwarf.
