= Gamma Delphini =

Star in the constellation Delphinus

γ Delphini
- Location of γ Delphini (circled)

Observation data Epoch J2000.0 Equinox ICRS
- Constellation: Delphinus
- γ^{1}
- Right ascension: 20^{h} 46^{m} 38.86045^{s}
- Declination: +16° 07′ 26.8516″
- Apparent magnitude (V): 5.14
- γ^{2}
- Right ascension: 20^{h} 46^{m} 39.49919^{s}
- Declination: +16° 07′ 27.4358″
- Apparent magnitude (V): 4.360

Characteristics

γ^{1}
- Spectral type: F7V
- U−B color index: 0.08
- B−V color index: 0.49

γ^{2}
- Evolutionary stage: Subgiant
- Spectral type: K1IV
- U−B color index: 0.97
- B−V color index: 1.04

Astrometry

γ^{1}
Radial velocity (R_{v})	−7.25±0.44 km/s
Proper motion (μ)	RA: −11.153 mas/yr Dec.: −203.341 mas/yr
Parallax (π)	28.4068±0.1504 mas
Distance	114.8 ± 0.6 ly (35.2 ± 0.2 pc)
Absolute magnitude (M_{V})	2.24

γ^{2}
Radial velocity (R_{v})	−6.33±0.35 km/s
Proper motion (μ)	RA: −29.851 mas/yr Dec.: −196.058 mas/yr
Parallax (π)	28.5183±0.4772 mas
Distance	114 ± 2 ly (35.1 ± 0.6 pc)
Absolute magnitude (M_{V})	1.81

Orbit
Secondary	γ^{1}
Period (P)	3,249 yr
Semi-major axis (a)	10.22″
Eccentricity (e)	0.88
Inclination (i)	148.78°
Longitude of the node (Ω)	88.06°
Periastron epoch (T)	2,305
Argument of periastron (ω) (secondary)	331.16°

Details

γ^{1}
Mass	1.61±0.04 M_{☉}
Radius	2.60±0.12 R_{☉}
Luminosity	10.2 L_{☉}
Surface gravity (log g)	3.79±0.05 cgs
Temperature	6,295±25 K
Metallicity [Fe/H]	0.06±0.02 dex
Rotational velocity (v sin i)	7.8 km/s
Age	1.85±0.17 Gyr

γ^{2}
Mass	1.99±0.06 M_{☉}
Radius	8.43±0.33 R_{☉}
Luminosity	33.1 L_{☉}
Surface gravity (log g)	3.04±0.06 cgs
Temperature	4,798±20 K
Metallicity [Fe/H]	0.12±0.03 dex
Rotational velocity (v sin i)	3.6 km/s
Age	1.81±0.11 Gyr

Other designations
- γ Del, 12 Delphini, BD+15°4255, CCDM J20467+1607, WDS 20467+1607
- γ^{1}: Dhanishta, HD 197963, HIP 102531, HR 7947, SAO 106475
- γ^{2}: HD 197964, HIP 102532, HR 7947/7948, SAO 106476

Database references
SIMBAD	γ Del
- γ^{1} Del
- γ^{2} Del

Gamma Delphini is a wide binary star system in the northern constellation of Delphinus. Its name is a Bayer designation that is Latinized from γ Delphini and abbreviated Gamma Del or γ Del. The star marks one corner of the asterism "Job's Coffin". The pair can be split with a modest amateur telescope and have been described as "one of the prettier pairs in the sky", with their contrasting colors said to be orange and lime in appearance. Together, the system is visible to the naked eye with a combined apparent visual magnitude of 3.87.

The two components of the system are designated γ^{1} Delphini (with the proper name Dhanishta) and γ^{2} Delphini.

== Nomenclature ==
Dhanishta is one of the 27 nakshatras in Indian astronomy; its asterism corresponds to the constellation Delphinus. The IAU Working Group on Star Names adopted the name Dhanishta for γ^{1} Delphini on 16 July 2026.

== Space motion ==
The system is located at a distance of 115 light-years from the Sun based on parallax, but is drifting closer with a radial velocity of −7 km/s. It is a member of the thin disk population, and is a proposed member of the Wolf 630 moving group.

This star was found to be a double by Christian Mayer and later observed by William Herschel on Sept 27th, 1779. It was later included as STF 2727 in the catalogue compiled by F. G. W. Struve and can be found under this name in the Washington Double Star Catalog. At the time, the components had an angular separation of 12.0″ along a position angle (PA) of 280°. As of 2019, they are separated by 8.90″ with a PA of 265°. The fainter component, designated γ^{1} Delphini, is of apparent magnitude 5.03. Its companion is a magnitude 4.360 star designated γ^{2} Delphini. A fit of orbital elements to the available positional data provides a period of 3,249 years with a high eccentricity (ovalness) of 0.88. Their physical separation ranges from roughly 40 out to 600 AU.

== Physical properties ==
The stellar classification of γ^{1} Delphini is F7V, which matches an F-type main-sequence star with a yellow-white hue. It is about 1.8 billion years old and is spinning with a projected rotational velocity of 7.8 km/s. The star has 1.6 times the mass and 2.6 times the radius of the Sun. It is radiating 10 times the Sun's luminosity from its photosphere at an effective temperature of 6,295 K.

The brighter component, γ^{2} Delphini, has an orange hue with a class of K1IV. Being the more massive star of the pair, it is the more evolved star and is currently on the subgiant branch. It has double the mass of the Sun but has expanded to over eight times the Sun's radius. The star is radiating 33 times the luminosity of the Sun at 4,798 K. It is spinning with a projected rotational velocity of 3.6 km/s. The star displays a radial acceleration with a periodicity of 1.44 years, which may be the effect of an orbiting companion.

The system is a source of X-ray emission with high probability.

== Search for planets ==
In 1999, the presence of a planetary companion was inferred around Gamma^{2} Delphini as one possible explanation for the radial velocity variations. Such a planet would have a minimum mass of 0.7 Jupiter masses, orbital period of 1.44 years and separation of nearly 1.5 astronomical units (almost the orbital separation of Mars from the Sun). The planetary candidate has not been confirmed. McDonald Observatory researches have set mass limits for potential planetary companions in orbit around the star Gamma^{2} Delphini.
