= Delta Delphini =

Star in the constellation Delphinus

- A star chart of the Delphinus constellation showing the position of δ Delphinus (circled)

Observation data Epoch J2000.0 Equinox ICRS
- Constellation: Delphinus
- Right ascension: 20^{h} 43^{m} 27.534^{s}
- Declination: +15° 04′ 28.483″
- Apparent magnitude (V): 4.43 (4.38 - 4.49)

Characteristics
- Spectral type: kA7hF1VmF1pSrEuCr:
- B−V color index: +0.302
- Variable type: δ Sct

Astrometry
Radial velocity (R_{v})	9.48±0.07 km/s
Proper motion (μ)	RA: −20.663 mas/yr Dec.: −42.983 mas/yr
Parallax (π)	14.7809±0.1275 mas
Distance	221 ± 2 ly (67.7 ± 0.6 pc)
Absolute magnitude (M_{V})	+0.25

Orbit
Period (P)	40.60505±0.00014 d
Semi-major axis (a)	5.4676±0.0037
Eccentricity (e)	0.64008±0.00018
Inclination (i)	13.92±0.18°
Longitude of the node (Ω)	63.73±0.33°
Periastron epoch (T)	56823.5019±0.0028 MJD
Argument of periastron (ω) (secondary)	65.07±0.32°
Semi-amplitude (K_{1}) (primary)	13.88±0.14 km/s
Semi-amplitude (K_{2}) (secondary)	15.27±0.07 km/s

Details

δ Del A
Mass	1.78 M_{☉}
Radius	3.43 R_{☉}
Luminosity	32.4 L_{☉}
Surface gravity (log g)	3.71 cgs
Temperature	7,440±210 K
Metallicity [Fe/H]	−0.5 dex
Rotational velocity (v sin i)	17 km/s
Age	945 Myr

δ Del B
Mass	1.62 M_{☉}
Radius	3.48 R_{☉}
Luminosity	28.8 L_{☉}
Temperature	7,110±180 K
Rotational velocity (v sin i)	12 km/s

Other designations
- δ Del, 11 Del, BD+14°4403, FK5 778, GC 28873, HD 197461, HIP 102281, HR 7928, SAO 106425, WDS J20435+1504AB

Database references
SIMBAD	data

Delta Delphini is a binary star system in the northern constellation of Delphinus. Its name is a Bayer designation that is Latinized from δ Delphini and abbreviated Delta Del or δ Del. This system is visible to the naked eye as a point of light with an apparent visual magnitude of 4.43. Based upon an annual parallax shift of 14.61 mas as seen from the Earth, the system is located about 223 light years from the Sun.

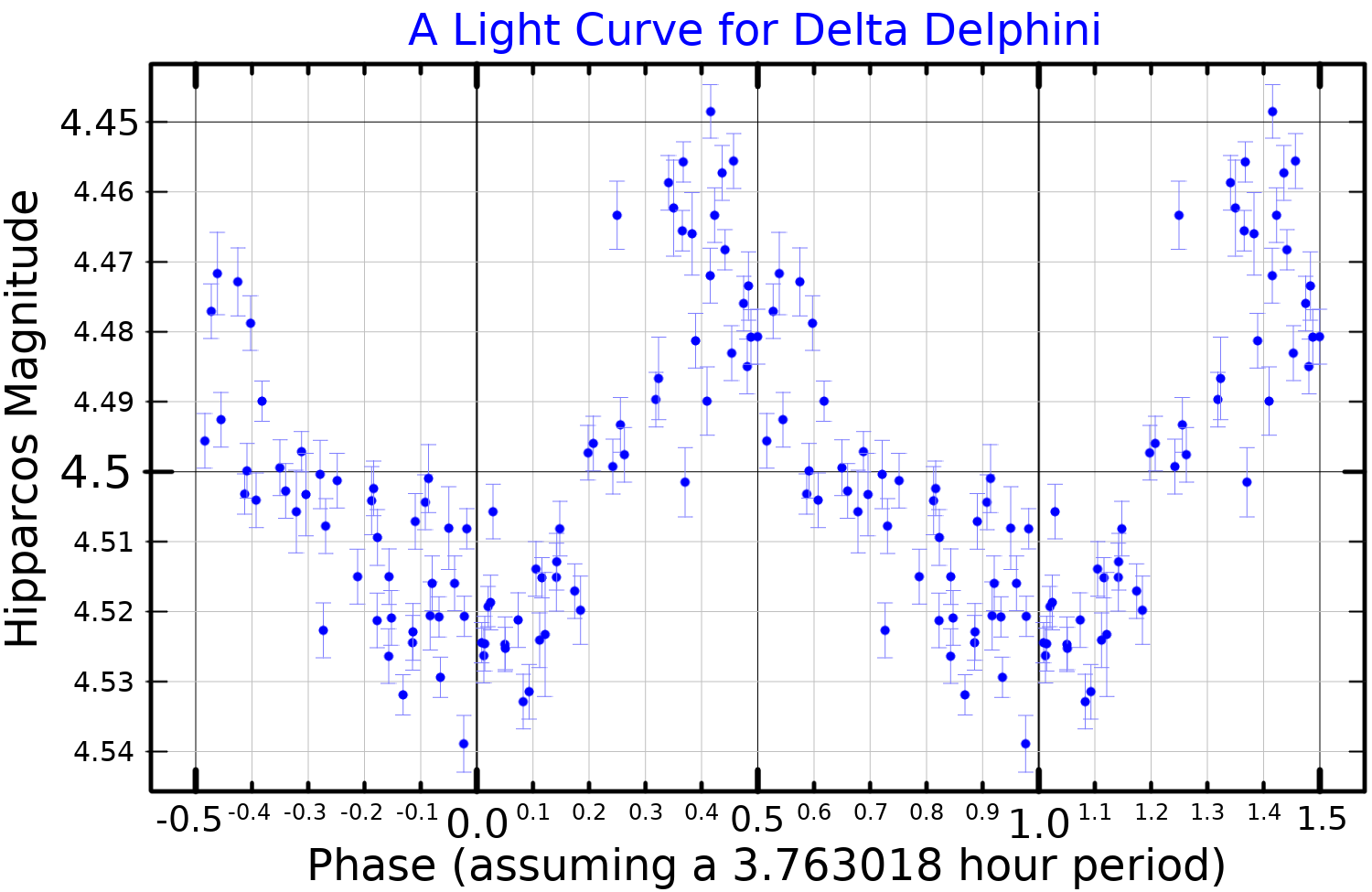
A light curve for Delta Delphini, plotted from Hipparcos data

This is a double-lined spectroscopic binary system with an orbital period of 40.58 days. The two components are nearly identical chemically peculiar stars, having a combined stellar classification of kA7hF1VmF1pSrEuCr:. This notation indicates the calcium K line matches an A7 star, the hydrogen lines an F1 star, and the metal lines an F1 star, with particularly strong lines of strontium, europium, and chromium. Each of the stars is a Delta Scuti variable, with the system having a dominant period of 0.1568 days and an amplitude of 0.0700 in magnitude. Delta Delphini forms the prototype of a class of metal-lined δ Scuti subgiant or giant stars.
