= Palermo Astronomical Observatory =

Astronomical observatory in Palermo, Sicily, Italy

Giuseppe S. Vaiana Astronomical Observatory
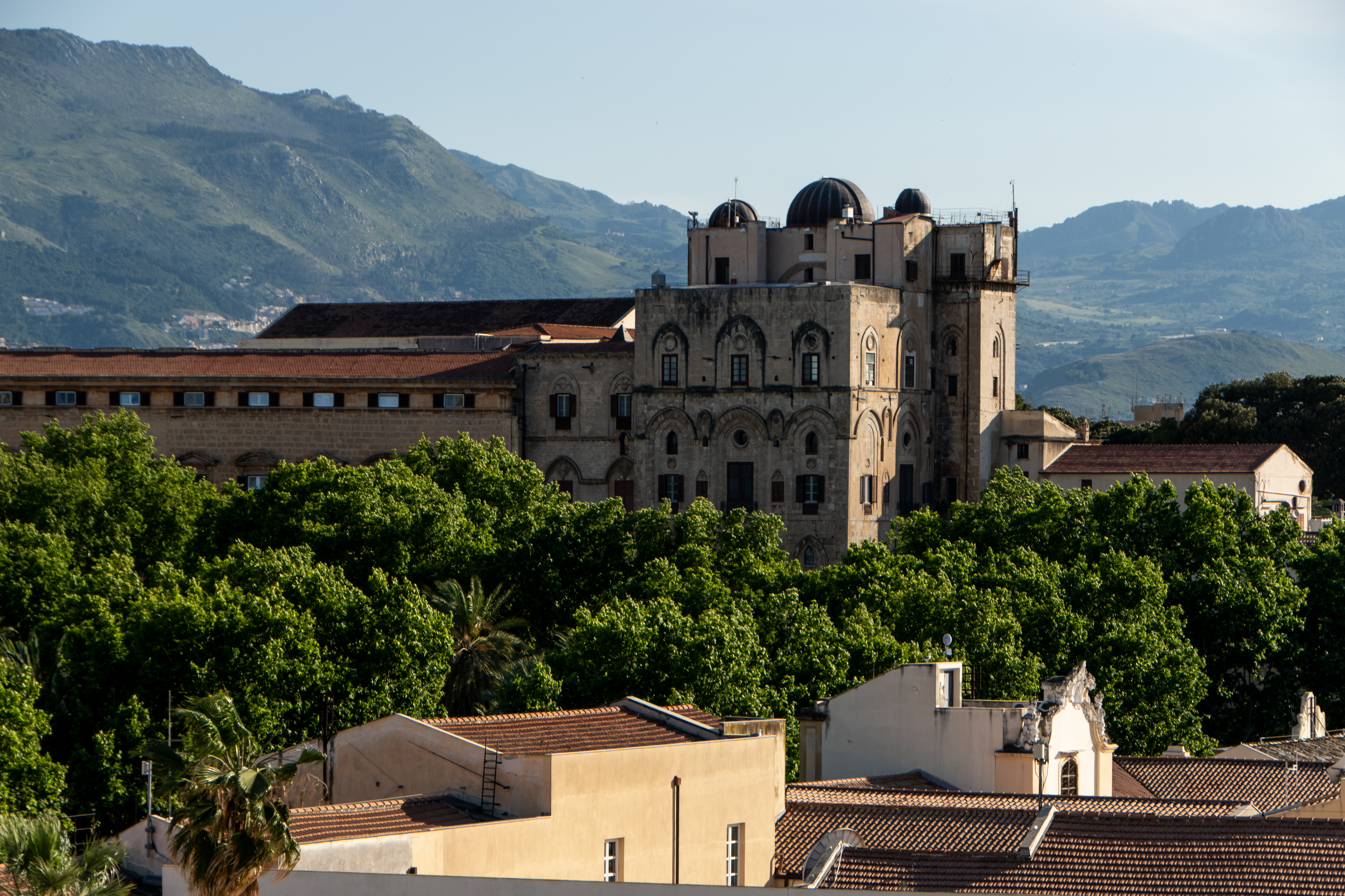
- The observatory as viewed from Palermo Cathedral
- Alternative names: Palermo Astronomical Observatory
- Named after: Giuseppe Salvatore Vaiana
- Organization: National Institute for Astrophysics
- Observatory code: 535
- Location: Piazza del Parlamento, 1, 90134 Palermo PA, Italy
- Coordinates: 38.1115°N 13.3532°E
- Established: 1790
- Website: https://www.astropa.inaf.it/en/
- Related media on Commons

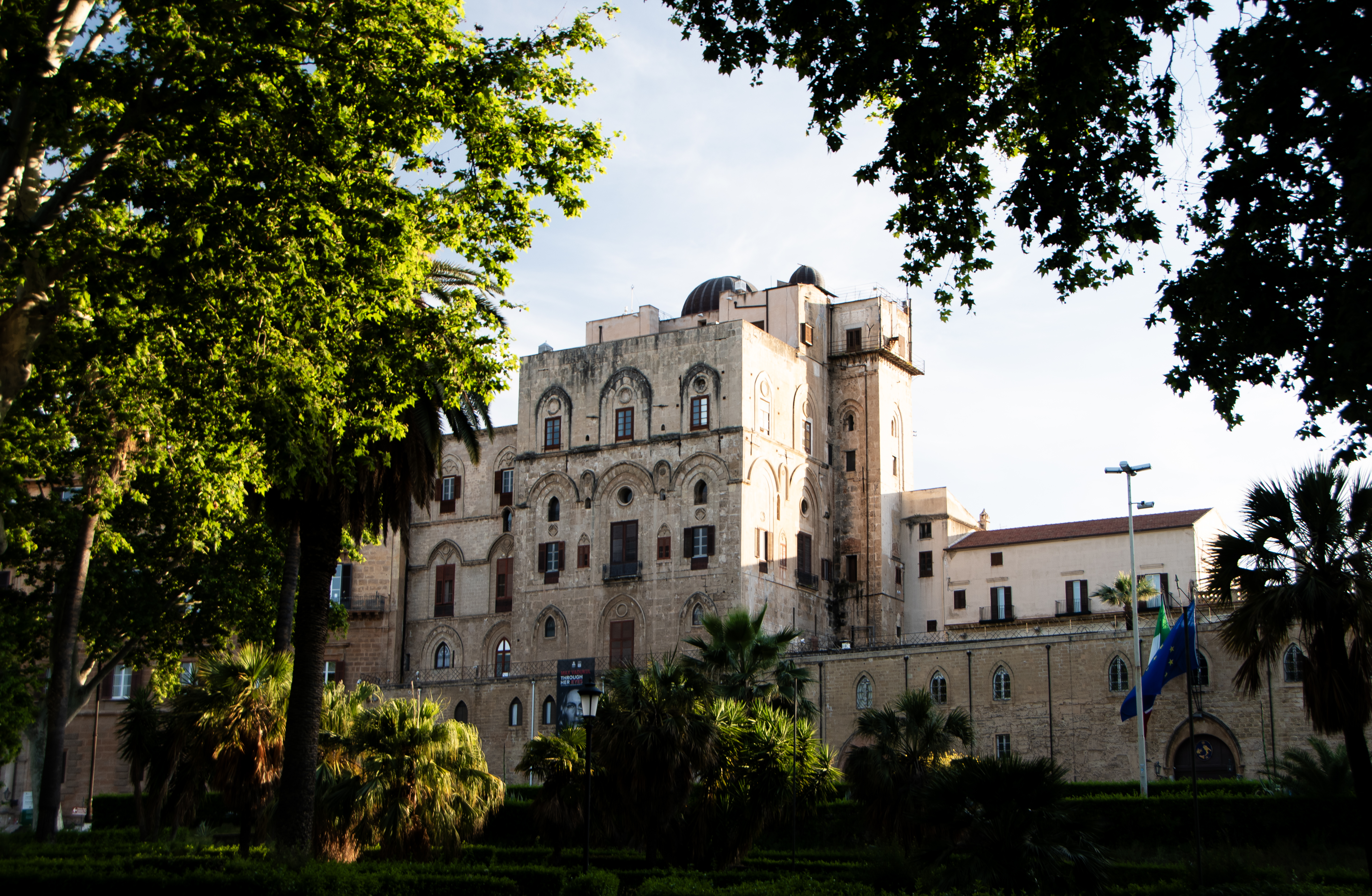
The observatory as viewed from the ground

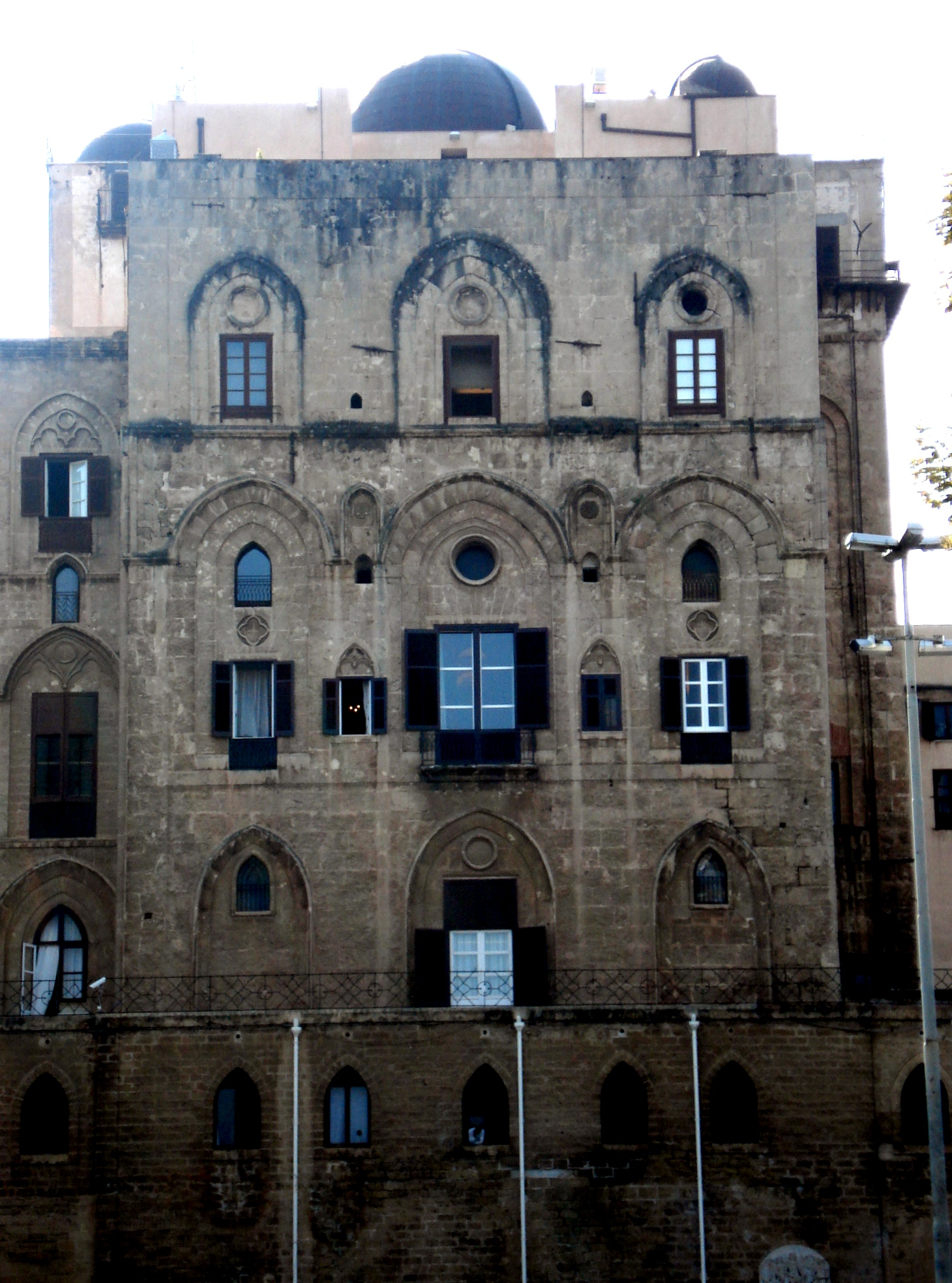
The part of the Palace of the Normans hosting the observatory

The Giuseppe S. Vaiana Astronomical Observatory is an astronomical observatory located in Palermo, Sicily, Italy, housed inside the Palazzo dei Normanni. It is one of the research facilities of the National Institute of Astrophysics. The observatory carries out research projects in the field of astronomy and astrophysics including the study of solar and stellar coronas, stellar evolution (including the birth of stars) and of the supernova remnants.

== History ==
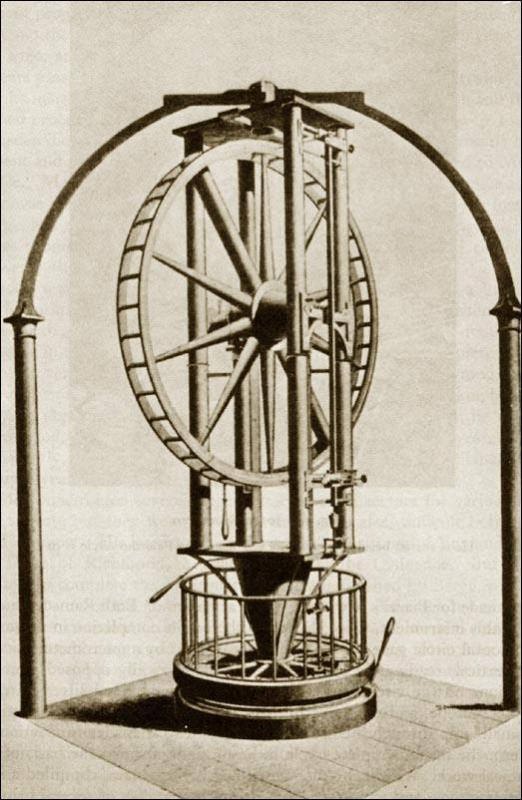
The 5-foot diameter Palermo circle manufactured by Jesse Ramsden to measure apparent positions of astronomical objects.

It was founded in 1790 by Ferdinand I of the Two Sicilies, at the suggestion of some intellectuals of the time, including the then Sicilian viceroy Francesco d'Aquino, Prince of Caramanico to endow the Sicilian city with an element of prestige as an astronomical observatory. It was hard to find an expert astronomer who would agree to work in such a peripheral location at the time. In the end the choice fell on Giuseppe Piazzi, a middle-aged mathematician, who before had not particularly distinguished himself in astronomy. The new director immediately dealt with the purchase of the most modern astronomical instruments of the time to make the observatory compete at European level: among other things, a surveying instrument of five-foot diameter to work in conjunction with telescopes to document the position of stars was purchased, made by English manufacturer Jesse Ramsden, and the first dome was built. It was Piazzi's determination that allowed the precious English instrument to arrive in Sicily: the astronomer had to go personally to prod the builder and, later, also cope with all the bureaucratic difficulties that arose: the British government was reluctant to allow the export of a uniquely capable instrument (a status which remained for many years, a fundamental aspect of the observatory's early value). Thanks to the new equipment, and in particular to the Palermo Circle, as it became known in English-speaking world (or the Circle of Ramsden in Italian), this was Ramsden's most celebrated achievement. In 1801 Piazzi discovered and identified the first asteroid Ceres. He named this object which became classified in the 21st century a dwarf planet, Cerere Ferdinandea, in honour of the myth of Ceres set in Sicily and of King Ferdinand; thanks to this discovery, he was awarded a gold medal which he refused instead donating its worth to the purchase of other instruments, including a Troughton equatorial telescope that he placed in the second dome of the observatory.

In 1817 Piazzi moved to Naples to complete the setting up of the Capodimonte Astronomical Observatory, leaving direction of the Palermo observatory to his assistant Niccolò Cacciatore. Cacciatore was succeeded, in 1841, by his son Gaetano; however, in 1848, he was removed for political reasons, having taken part in the revolutionary anti-Bourbon movements. The management of the Palermo observatory was then entrusted to Domenico Ragona, who succeeded in obtaining from the Two Sicilies government the necessary funds to purchase new instruments, including a 25 cm aperture Merz equatorial telescope, delivered in 1859.

With the Expedition of the Thousand in 1860, the situation was reversed: Gaetano Cacciatore's directorship was reinstated and Ragona removed, without being able to install the Merz telescope. Pietro Tacchini, appointed Deputy Astronomer in 1863, installed and commissioned the equatorial telescope in 1865, using it for solar physics research which would make the Palermo Observatory famous in the second half of the nineteenth century and lead to the foundation of the Society of Italian Spectroscopists (1871), whose Memoirs (Memorie) - the first review of astrophysics - would be published periodically in Palermo from 1872 by Tacchini.

The departure of Tacchini for Rome in 1879 began a difficult phase; Annibale Riccò, the Deputy (i.e. "Adjunct") Astronomer, managed to keep the quality of research high until he took over the direction of the Catania observatory in 1890; then, the political and military events – and the consequent financial difficulties of the Government – severely compromised the observatory, which in 1923 was downgraded to the university's Cabinet of Astronomy.

From 1931 to 1936 its director was Corradino Mineo, an academician of the Lincei, who had a second term from 1938 to 1948, after the directorship of Francesco Zagar. They were years characterized by great difficulties of the institution, which had already seen, in the reform of 1923, declassification to a simple astronomical cabinet, and it was hit by a serious decline, with a reduction of personnel and scarcity of funds for the conduct of observations and for technological adaptation. The problems became acute during and after the Second World War, when the observatory was close to closure, deprived of some premises, after having also been deprived, in 1939, of the only modern observation instrument it was equipped with, a model of zenith telescope developed by Julius Wanschaff in Berlin.

The three domes originally placed on the roof of the building were replaced in the fifties with others in iron, which were later removed because they were too heavy and dangerous for the structure; later, lighter copper domes of the previous design were installed. It is named after Giuseppe Salvatore Vaiana, who directed it from 1976 to 1991.

== Directors ==
- Giuseppe Piazzi
- Niccolò Cacciatore
- Gaetano Cacciatore
- Domenico Ragona
- Pietro Tacchini
- Annibale Riccò
- Temistocle Zona
- Filippo Angelitti
- Corradino Mineo
- Francesco Zagar
- Corradino Mineo
- Luciano Chiara
- Salvatore Leone
- Giuseppe Salvatore Vaiana
- Salvatore Serio
- Salvatore Sciortino
- Giuseppina Micela

== Activities ==
The observatory has a laboratory for the development and testing of scientific instrumentation for x-ray band telescopes (X-ray Astronomy Calibration and Testing Facility, XACT) in a separate building, a high-tech computing center, carries out iterations and error-testing of numerical models collating observations and measurements in astrophysics (System of Calculation for Numerical Astrophysics, SCAN) and the Museum of the Specola, which contains a vast collection of astronomical instruments belonging to the Observatory.

== Museum ==
The Museum of the Specola, located at the top of the leaning tower of the Norman palace, is mainly composed of 18th- and 19th-century instruments, among which are achromatic telescopes, a sextant, some barometers and thermometers, as well as two main items earlier mentioned: the Palermo Circle (circle by Ramsden) and Edward Troughton's equatorial telescope. It hosts other contemporary instruments and a series of oil paintings that portray personalities from the scientific world.

== See also ==
- List of astronomical observatories
