= Rudolf Ferdinand Spitaler =

Austrian astronomer, geophysicist, meteorologist and climatologist

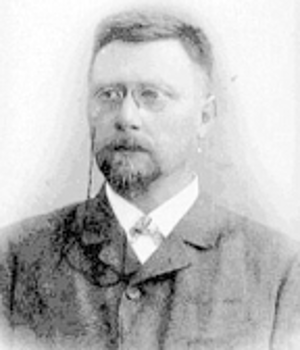
- Portrait of Rudolf Ferdinand Spitaler
- Born: 7 January 1849
- Died: 16 October 1946 (aged 97)
- Occupations: Astronomer, geophysicist, meteorologist, and climatologist

Rudolf Ferdinand Spitaler (7 January 1849 – 16 October 1946) was an Austrian astronomer, geophysicist, meteorologist and climatologist.

He discovered 64 IC objects whilst working at Vienna Observatory and Comet 113P/Spitaler.

The geophysicist and meteorologist Leo Wenzel Pollak was one of his PhD students.

He was one of the first to speculate the existence of a 13th zodiacal constellation, which later became known as Ophiuchus.

== Selected works ==
- Zeichnungen und Photographien am Grubb’schen Refractor von 68cm (27 engl. Zoll) Öffnung in den Jahren 1885 bis 1890 (1891)
- Bahnbestimmung des Kometen 1851 III (Brorsen) (1894)
- Periodische Verschiebungen des Schwerpunktes der Erde (1905)
- Die Achsenschwankungen der Erde als Ursache der Auslösung von Erdbeben (1913)
- Das Klima des Eiszeitalters (1921)
