= List of Natchathara temples =

List of temples of stars

This is a list of Natchathara (Nakshathra, Stars) Temples of Hindus. These temples are also called Nakshathiram Temples or Birth Star Temples.

No	Natchathara Name	Natchathara Temple Name
1	Ashwini	Thiruthuraipoondi Piravi Marundeeswarar Temple
2	Bharani	Nalladai Agneeswarar Temple
3	Karthigai	Kanjanagaram Kathra Sundareswarar Temple
4	Rohini	Kancheepuram Sri Pandava Dhootha Perumal temple
5	Mrugaseersam	Enkan Adhinarayana Perumal Temple
6	Thiruvathirai	Athirampattinam Sri Abhaya Varadeeswarar Temple
7	Punarpoosam	Vaniyambadi Athitheeswarar temple
8	Poosam	Vilankulam Akshayapureeswarar temple
9	Ayilyam	Tirundudevankudi Karkadeswarar Temple
10	Maham	Medai Mahalingeswarar temple
11	Pooram	Thiruvarangulam Arangulanathar Temple
12	Uthiram	Idayattru Mangalam Maangalyeswarar temple
13	Hastham	Komal Krupakupareshwarar Temple
14	Chithirai	Kuruvithurai Chitra Ratha Vallabha Perumal Temple
15	Swathi	Chithukadu Dhaathreeswarar temple
16	Visakam	Panpollhi Muthukumaraswami temple
17	Anusam	Tirunindraiyur Mahalakshmiswarar temple
18	Ketai	Pasupathikoil Varadharaja Perumal Temple
19	Moolam	Mappedu Singeeswarar Temple
20	Pooradam	Kaduveli Akashapureeswarar temple
21	Uthiradam	Keezhapungudi Brahma Pureeswarar Temple
22	Thiruvonam	Tiruparkadal Prasanna Venkateswara Perumal temple
23	Avitam	Keezha Korukkai Brahmagnaana Pureeswarar Temple
24	Sathayam	Tirupugalur Agnipureeswarar temple
25	Poorattaadhi	Ranganathapuram Tiruvaneshwar temple
26	Uthirattaadhi	Theeyathur Sahasralakshmeeswarar Temple
27	Revathi	Kargudi Kailasanathar Temple
