= Akshayapureeswarar Temple =

Hindu temple in Thanjavur district, Tamil Nadu, India

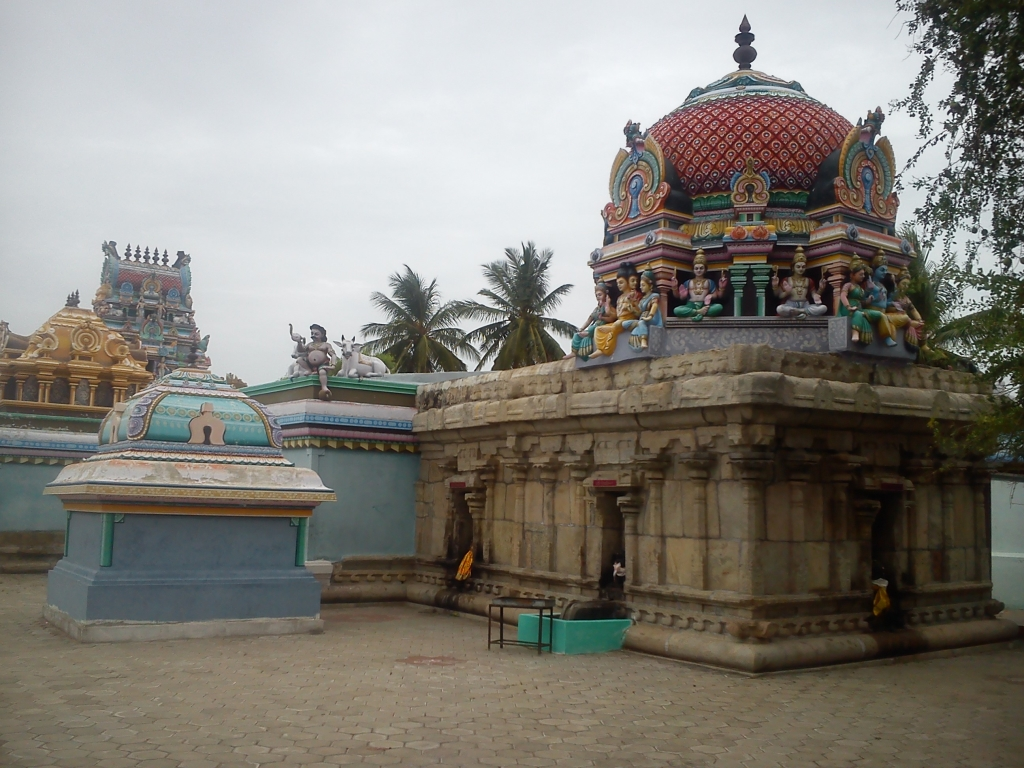
- The sanctum of Akshayapureeswarar Temple (right) with the gopuram (left)

Religion
- Affiliation: Hinduism
- Deity: Shiva as Akshayapureeswarar, Shani
- Features: Temple tree: Vila

Location
- Location: Vilankulam (Vilangulam)
- State: Tamil Nadu
- Country: India
- Interactive map of Akshayapureeswarar Temple
- Coordinates: 10°11′53″N 79°13′48″E

Architecture
- Type: Hindu temple architecture
- Style: Dravidian architecture
- Completed: 13th century

The Akshayapureeswarar Temple at Vilankulam (Vilangulam) in the Indian state of Tamil Nadu is a 13th-century Hindu temple dedicated to Shiva.

The temple is known for its shrine of Shani, the graha god of the planet Saturn. It is one of the 27 Nakshatra (Natchathara) temples, associated with the 27 Nakshatra (lunar mansions). It is associated with Pushya (Poosam) nakshatra.

== Legend ==
In Hindu religion the Akshayapureeswarar Temple is associated with the god Shani. According to Hindu legend, the god of death Yama hit the leg of his brother Shani, crippling him. Shani then visited various temples of Shiva for a remedy. Finally at Vilankulam (the location where the Akshayapureeswarar Temple was built), Shani tripped over the roots of a vila tree on the day of Akshaya Tritiya, which was a Saturday. In Hindu astrology the day Saturday is governed by Shani, and is associated with the Pushya (Poosam) nakshatra (constellation).

Hindu legend also claims that the spring Poosa Gnanavavi sprang at the place were Shani fell. According to that legend, Shiva as Akshayapureeswarar appeared before Shani, curing Shani's leg and giving a blessing to Shani that he would be married. Shani's leg injury is said to be the reason of his slow movement in the horoscope. Shiva is also said to have arranged for Shani's marriage.

As per a version of the legend, a crow took away Shani's disability. As such, Shani appointed the crow as his vahana (mount). As per another tale, Akshayapureeswarar granted the nidhis (treasures) to Kubera, the god of wealth.

Vilankulam derives its name from the tree vila and the spring (kulam).

== History ==
The temple was built in the 13th century AD. The temple has inscriptions stating that the king Parakrama Pandyan I worshipped in it.

== Architecture ==
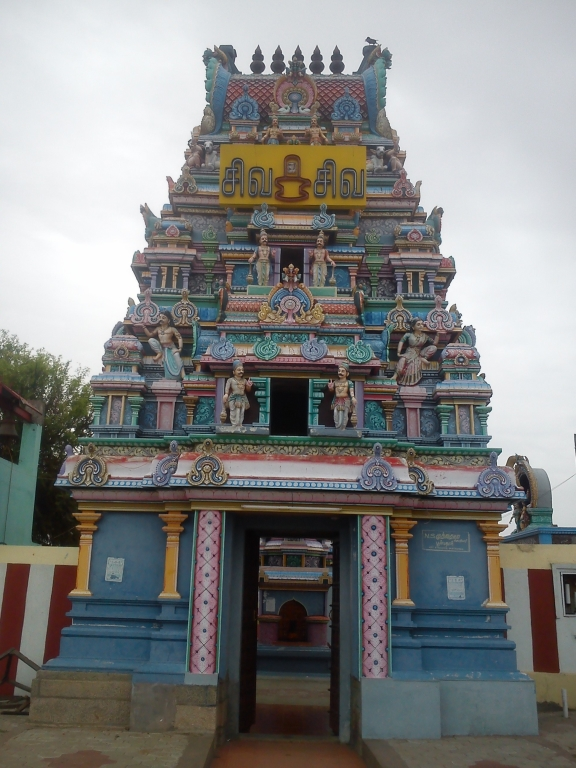
The gopuram of the temple

The temple faces east with a gopuram (gateway tower). The Vasantha mandapa (hall) is next to the prakaram (enclosure around the sanctum). To the right of the mandapa is the shrine of Shiva's consort Parvati as Abhivruddhi Nayaki. Her standing icon faces south and has four arms with a lotus, a staff in her upper arms; her lower arms in abhaya and varada mudras (hand gestures). She is said to shower the devotees with fortune and progress.

Next to Artha mandapa close to the Maha mandapa are the twin Ganesha (Shiva's son) icons. Goddess Mariamman and Pradosha Nayakar Thirumeni are on the right. Next to it is the east-facing sanctum dedicated to Shiva as Akshayapureeswarar, who is worshipped as a linga. Narthana Vinayaka (dancing Ganesha), Dakshinamurti (Shiva as a teacher), the god Brahma, the goddess Durga and the goddess Gajalakshmi are worshipped in the Deva kottam. Other aspects of Shiva like Bhairava, Lingodbhava and Nataraja are worshipped. The temple has shrines dedicated to Shiva's son Murugan (Kartikeya) with his consorts Devayanai and Valli, the saint Chandeshvara, Shiva's bull mount Nandi, and the serpent deity Naga. Ganesha is worshipped as Vijaya Vinayaka in a temple opposite the main temple and said to bestow success.

The Sthala Vriksha ("temple-tree") is the vila tree. The vila tree is found on the north side of the Shani temple. To south of the temple, the spring Poosa Gnanavavi is found.

There is a separate shrine for Shani in the temple premises. Shani, as Aadhibruhat Shanishvara, is depicted being wedded to his consorts Jyestha and Mandha. Shani's father Sun-god Surya is also enshrined on the temple grounds.

== Worship ==
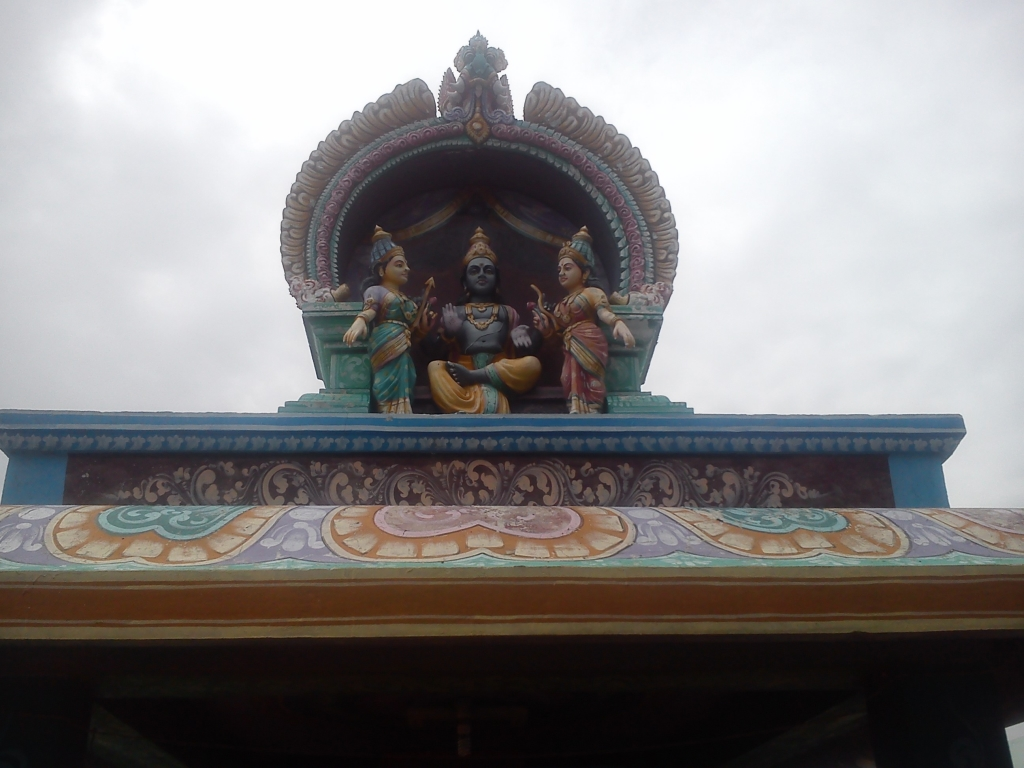
The temple is known for its shrine of Shani

The temple celebrates the Shiva-related festivals of Mahashivaratri, Tirukarthikai and Thiruvathira. In addition, special worship is performed for Dakshinamurti on Thursdays, Nandi on Pradosha and Bhairava on Bhairava Ashtami.

Shani is especially worshipped on Akshaya Tritiya, when devotees throng this temple.

Pushya is the eighth lunar mansion. Those belonging to Pushya are advised to worship Shani here on the Pushya day or Akashya Tritiya. Those suffering from debt, disability, disease and malefic effects of Shani in their horoscope, and not getting married are prescribed to worship Shani here. Shani is said to grant relief from Sade sati (a 7.5 year period associated with Shani) by worshipping him here. Longevity and protection from fear, accident, death and enemies is said to be granted by worshipping this Shani.

Shani is Lord of the number eight. Shani is propitiated by anointing (abhisheka) eight times with eight items like oil, punugu (a fragrant paste), coconut and panchamrita (milk, curd, ghee, honey and sugar). Devotees circumambulate the shrine eight times. Food offerings are dedicated to Shani and also to crows in the prakaram.
