= Ashvini =

1st lunar mansion of Hindu astrology

Aries constellation showing Ashivini

Ashvini (अश्विनी, IAST: aśvinī) is the first nakshatra (lunar mansion) in Indian astronomy, having a spread from 0°-0'-0" to 13°-20'. It corresponds to the head of Aries, including the stars β and γ Arietis, and possibly also α Arietis in the oldest versions of the asterism. Ashvini literally means "twin horse-man"; it is depicted as a horse's head and represents twin physician gods, the Ashvins. The two Ashwin god names are known as Nasatya and Dasra. The name aśvinī is used by Varāhamihira (6th century). The older name of the asterism, found in the Atharvaveda (AVS 19.7; in the dual) and in Pāṇini (4.3.36), was aśvayúja, "harnessing horses". This nakshatra belongs to Mesha Rasi.

== Astrology ==
Ashvini is ruled by Ketu, the descending lunar node. In electional astrology, Ashvini is classified as a small constellation, meaning that it is believed to be advantageous to begin works of a precise or delicate nature while the moon is in Ashvini. Ashvini is ruled by the Ashvinas, the heavenly twin brother gods who served as physicians to the gods and goddesses. Ashvini is represented by the bee hive.

Traditional Indian names are determined by which pada (quarter) of a nakshatra the Ascendant was in at the time of birth. In the case of Ashvini, the given name would begin with the following syllables: Chu, Che, Cho, La.

== See also ==
- List of Nakshatras
