= Thiruthuraipoondi Piravi Marundeeswarar Temple =

Hindu temple in Tiruvarur district, Tamil Nadu, India

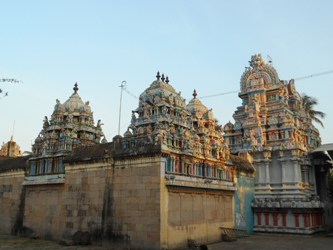
- Piravi Marundeeswarar Temple, Thiruthuraipoondi, Tiruvarur, Tamil Nadu

- Piravi Marundeeswarar Temple, Thiruthuraipoondi, Tiruvarur, Tamil Nadu

Religion
- Affiliation: Hinduism
- District: Tiruvarur
- Deity: Piravi Marundeeswarar (Shiva)
- Festivals: Maha Shivaratri, Chithirai festival, Navaratri

Location
- Location: Thiruthuraipoondi
- State: Tamil Nadu
- Country: India
- Interactive map of Thiruthuraipoondi Piravi Marundeeswarar Temple
- Coordinates: 10.5329°N 79.6404°E

Architecture
- Type: Dravidian architecture

Specifications
- Temple: One
- Elevation: 31.26 m (103 ft)

Piravi Marundeeswarar Temple is a Hindu temple situated at Thiruthuraipoondi neighbourhood in Tiruvarur, in the state of Tamil Nadu in India. It is dedicated to the god Shiva.

== Location ==
This temple is located with the coordinates of (10.5329°N 79.6404°E) at Thiruthuraipoondi.

Thiruthuraipoondi Piravi Marundeeswarar Temple (Tamil Nadu)

== Details ==
This temple is an exclusive temple for people with the birth star Ashvini. Shiva here in this temple is also called as Gajasamharamurthy.
