= Alathambadi =

- village
- Location in Tamil Nadu, India
- Coordinates: 10.60°N 79.65°E
- Country: India
- State: Tamil Nadu
- District: Tiruvarur

Languages
  - Official: Tamil
- Time zone: UTC+5:30 (IST)
- PIN: 610211
- Telephone code: 04369
- Vehicle registration: TN 50

Alathambadi is a large village located in Thiruthuraipoondi of Thiruvarur district in the Indian state of Tamil Nadu.

== Demography ==
There are a total of 909 families residing. The Alathambadi village has population of 3244 of which 1598 are males while 1646 are females as per Population Census 2011. The total geographical area of village is 470.95 hectares.

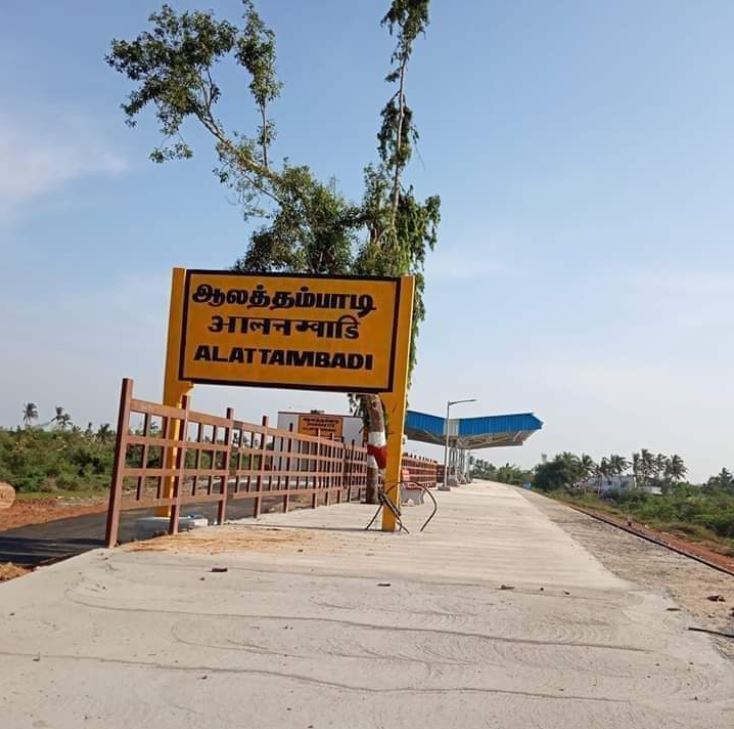
Alattambadi Railway Station

In Alathambadi village population of children with age 0-6 is 315 which makes up 9.71 % of total population of village. Average Sex Ratio of Alathambadi village is 1030 which is higher than Tamil Nadu state average of 996. Child Sex Ratio for the Alathambadi as per census is 875, lower than Tamil Nadu average of 943.

Alathambadi village has higher literacy rate compared to Tamil Nadu. In 2011, literacy rate of Alathambadi village was 83.20 % compared to 80.09 % of Tamil Nadu. In Alathambadi Male literacy stands at 89.72 % while female literacy rate was 76.98 %.

The majority of residents make their living from agriculture, but an increasing number of people travel to gulf countries for employment.

As per constitution of India and Panchyati Raaj Act, Alathambadi village is administrated by Sarpanch (Head of Village) who is elected representative of village.

== Geography ==
The village people are dependent on the North East monsoon and the Cauvery river for irrigation.

This village have 4 types of seasons:

1. Winter - occurring between Jan and March The year's coldest months are December and January, when temperatures average around 20-25°C.
2. Summer or pre-monsoon - lasting from March to June. Temperatures average around 32-40°C. The hottest months are April and May.
3. Monsoon or rainy
4. Post-monsoon

== Religious places ==
Vellankani church, which is a Christian religious spot, is 35 km away. Nagore Dharga, which is a famous Muslim religious spot, is 40 km away. Thiruvarur and Thanjavur are the two famous Hindu religious spots nearby.
