= Nalladai Agneeswarar Temple =

Hindu temple in Mayiladuthurai district, Tamil Nadu, India

- Agneeswarar Temple, Nalladai, Mayiladuthurai, Tamil Nadu

Religion
- Affiliation: Hinduism
- District: Mayiladuthurai
- Deity: Agneeswarar
- Festival: Maha Shivaratri

Location
- Location: Nalladai
- State: Tamil Nadu
- Country: India
- Interactive map of Nalladai Agneeswarar Temple
- Coordinates: 11.0138°N 79.7448°E

Architecture
- Type: Dravidian architecture

Specifications
- Temple: One
- Inscriptions: available
- Elevation: 17.58 m (58 ft)

Agneeswarar Temple is a Hindu temple situated at Nalladai in Mayiladuthurai district of Tamil Nadu state in India. It is dedicated to the god Shiva as Agneeswarar.

== Location ==
This temple is located with the coordinates of (11.0138°N 79.7448°E) at Nalladai - 609306.

== Deities ==
Shiva as Agneeswarar is the main deity. His consort goddess is called Sundaranayaki in this temple. The shrine of Shiva faces west. The shrine of the goddess faces south. These are specialities of this temple.

== Significance ==
It is one of the Nakshathiram Temples. believed that people with birth star 'Bharani' worship here in this temple to be rectified from the adverse effects of planets.

== Maintenance ==
This temple is maintained under the Hindu Religious and Charitable Endowments Department, Government of Tamil Nadu.

== Sub deities ==
Vishnu, Mahalakshmi, Kailasanathar, Dakshinamurti, Bhuvaneswari, Chandikeswarar, Durga, Dwara Vinayaka (Ganesha), Selva Vinayaka (another icon of Ganesha), Somaskanda, Balamurugan, Kalyani, Surya, Shani, Veerabhadra and Bhairava are the sub deities.
