= Abhaya Varadeeswarar Temple, Adirampattinam =

Hindu temple in Thanjavur district, Tamil Nadu, India

Coordinates: 10.334814°N 79.379905°E

Abhaya Varadeeswarar
- Location in Tamil Nadu

Religion
- Affiliation: Hinduism
- District: Thanjavur
- Deity: Abhaya Varadeeswarar (Shiva) Kadal Partha Nayaki (Parvati)

Location
- Location: Adiramapattinam
- State: Tamil Nadu
- Country: India

Architecture
- Type: Dravidian architecture

Abhaya Varadeeswarar Temple is a Hindu temple dedicated to the god Shiva located at Adiramapattinam in the Thanjavur district of Tamil Nadu, India. Shiva is worshiped as Abhaya Varadeeswarar, and is represented by the lingam. His consort Parvati is depicted as Kadal Partha Nayagai. The presiding deity is mentioned in the 7th century Tamil Saiva canonical work, the Tevaram, written by Tamil saint poets known as the Nayanars and classified as Vaippu Stalam.

The temple complex covers around one acre and can be entered through a three-tiered gopuram, the main gateway. The temple has a number of shrines, with those of Abhaya Varadeeswarar and Kadal Partha Nayagi, being the most prominent. All the shrines of the temple are enclosed in large concentric rectangular granite walls.

The temple has four daily rituals at various times from 6:00 a.m. to 8:00 p.m., and four yearly festivals on its calendar. Panguni Uthiram during the Tamil month of Panguni (March - April) are the most prominent festivals celebrated in the temple.

The original complex is believed to have been built by Cholas, while the present masonry structure was built by later ruling empires. In modern times, the temple is maintained and administered by the Hindu Religious and Charitable Endowments Department of the Government of Tamil Nadu.

== Legend ==
As per Hindu legend, the Devas who fought a losing battle to Asuras (demon) during one of their battles, worshipped Shiva at this place during the 13th day of a month during Adhira star. Since Shiva protected them here, he is worshipped as Abhaya Varadha, the one who saves the lives of the needy. Based on the legend, it is believed that Abhaya Varadeeswarar gives reassurance to those who surrendered to him. The devas (gods) are said to have sought protection of Shiva from asuras (demons) here in Thiruvathira period. His consort is known as Sundari or Sundaranayaki. The goddess is "Kadal Partha Nayaki" since her temple icon faces the ocean.

== Architecture ==
The temple is located in Adiramapattinam, a small town in Thanjavur district of Tamil Nadu. The town faces the Bay of Bengal and since the shrine of Amman, faces west, the deity is called "Kadal Partha Nayagi" (the deity facing the sea). The temple complex covers around one acre and can be entered through a three-tiered gopuram, the main gateway. The temple has a number of shrines, with those of Abhaya Varadeeswarar and Kadal Partha Nayagi, being the most prominent. All the shrines of the temple are enclosed in large concentric rectangular granite walls. The sanctum, facing east, is located axial to the gateway. The image of Kadal Partha Nayagi faces east. The first precinct houses the images of various supporting deities of Shiva namely, Vinayagar, Dakshinamurthy, Durga and Chandesa. The Pandyan king Adiveerarama Pandian, who was born of Thiruvathira star, was a devotee of the temple deity and gave his name to the village of Adiramapattinam. The original complex is believed to have been built by Cholas, while the present masonry structure was built by later ruling empires. In modern times, the temple is maintained and administered by the Hindu Religious and Charitable Endowments Department of the Government of Tamil Nadu.

== Religious importance ==
The temple is one of the shrines of the Vaippu Sthalams sung by Tamil Saivite Nayanar Sundarar. The temple is also praised in the hymns of the saint Sambandar. The temple is prescribed to worshipped by people born under the Thiruvathira (Ardra) star, suffering from astrological problems related to planetary deities Rahu and Ketu, and seeking cure from diseases or longevity. It is believed that Shiva roams here in the Thiruvathira period and during Pradosha (thirteenth lunar day occurring twice a month). The temple is one of 27 Nakshatra (lunar mansion) temples dedicated to Shiva; each of which prescribed for worship to resolve astrological issues linked to the lunar mansion.
