= Kargudi Kailasanathar Temple =

- Kailasanathar Temple, Kargudi, Tiruchirappalli, Tamil Nadu

Religion
- Affiliation: Hinduism
- District: Tiruchirappalli
- Deity: Kailasanathar
- Festival: Maha Shivaratri

Location
- Location: Kargudi
- State: Tamil Nadu
- Country: India
- Coordinates: 11.1497°N 78.4351°E

Architecture
- Type: Dravidian architecture

Specifications
- Temple: One
- Elevation: 178.94 m (587 ft)

Kailasanathar Temple is a Shiva temple situated at Kargudi in Tiruchirappalli of Tamil Nadu state in India.

== Location ==
This temple is located with the coordinates of 11.1497°N 78.4351°E in Tiruchirappalli district.

== Importance ==
After Lord Chandra married Goddess Revathi Nakshatra Devi, both of them had to visit Lord Shiva, and so Lord Kailasanathar and Goddess Karunakaravalli appeared to them at this temple site.

== Donations ==
About 1800 years ago, a king named Valvil Ori had ruled the Kollimalai area. He renovated this temple. After that in the year 1266, Karnataka king Bhosala Veeraramanathan donated a lot of lands to this temple and made it possible for worship to take place without any hindrance. In the years 1541 and 1619, a king named Rama Chakravarthy granted a lot of lands to this temple.

== Other shrines ==
The shrines for Kasi Visalakshi, Vishnu, Brahma, Kumkumavalli, Gomu Durga, Dakshinamurthy, Chandikeswar, Ganesha, Murugan, Agora Virabhadra, Sun, Moon, Navagraha, Kala Bhairava are also available in this temple.
