= Keelaperumalai =

Hamlet in Thiruthraipoondi Constituency, India

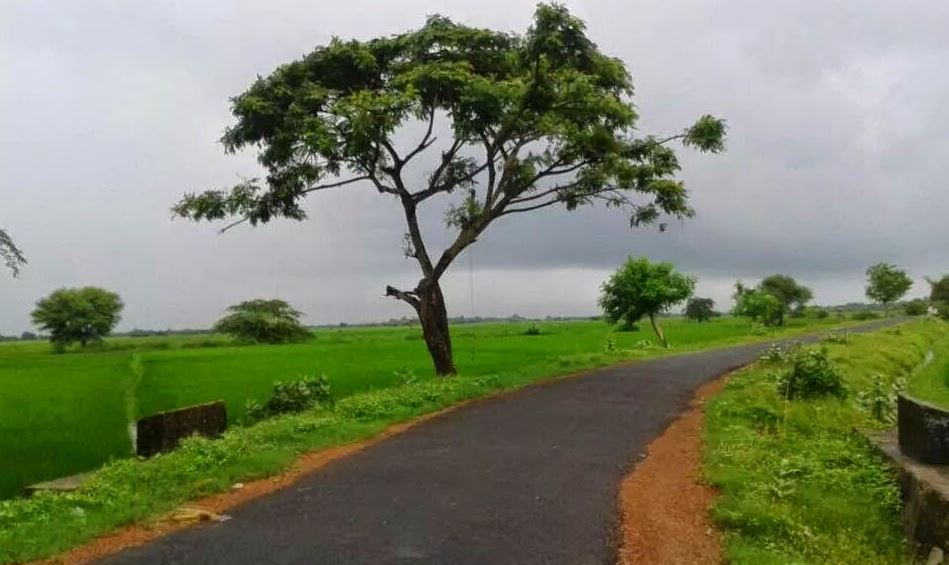
Keelaperumalai village, Thiruvarur district, Tamil Nadu.

Keelaperumalaiis is a small remote hamlet in Thiruthuraipoondi constituency. It is 10 km from Thiruthuraipoondi. This village is just 2 km away from the East Coast Road. There is a sivan temple, Angala amman temple and Lord Krishna temple. The livelihood of the village is Agriculture as like more Indian villages.

Country	India
State/Province	Tamil Nadu
District	Tiruvarur
Constituency	Thiruthuraipoondi
Livelihood	paddy cropping
Animals	goat, cow, buffalo
Language	Tamil
Religion	Hinduism
