= Mappedu Singeeswarar Temple =

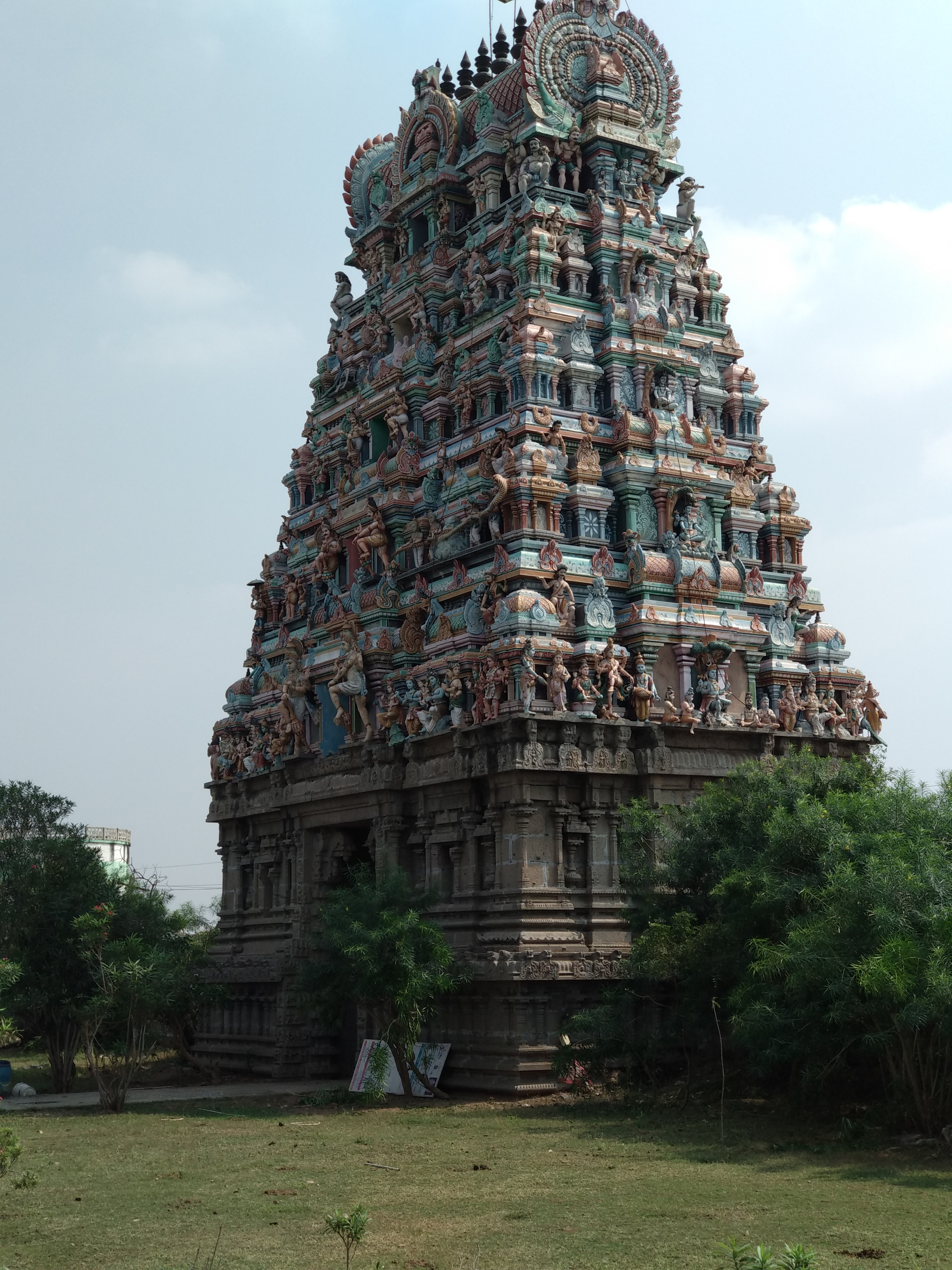
- Singeeswarar Temple, Mappedu, Tiruvallur, Tamil Nadu

- Singeeswarar Temple, Mappedu, Tiruvallur, Tamil Nadu

Religion
- Affiliation: Hinduism
- District: Tiruvallur
- Deity: Singeeswarar
- Festivals: Maha Shivaratri, Brahmotsav

Location
- Location: Mappedu
- State: Tamil Nadu
- Country: India
- Coordinates: 13.0303°N 79.8584°E

Architecture
- Type: Dravidian architecture
- Creator: Aditya Karikal Chollha II
- Completed: 976 A. D.

Specifications
- Temple: One
- Inscriptions: found
- Elevation: 84.18 m (276 ft)

Singeeswarar Temple is a Shiva temple which is maintained under the control of Hindu Religious and Charitable Endowments Department, Government of Tamil Nadu in India.

== Location ==
This temple is located with the coordinates of (13.0303°N 79.8584°E) at Mappedu in Tiruvallur of Tamil Nadu state in India.

From Poonamallee, about 20 km on the Chennai Poontamalli - Perambakkam highway, this temple is situated and considered to be a special temple with Anjaneya in the state of subtle, playing Veena.

Mappedu Singeeswarar Temple (Tamil Nadu)

== Creation ==
This temple was built by Aditya Karikal Chollha II (elder brother of Rajaraja Chollha) in the year 976 A. D.

During the reign of King Tirumala Nayaka, Kalathiappa Mudaliyar was his officer. Ariyanatha Mudaliar, son of Kalathiappa Mudaliar, served as the minister of King Tirumala Nayaka. Later he served as the chief officer viz., 'Thalavai' of King Krishnappa Nayaka II. He was born in Mappedu also called as 'Meippedu'. Therefore, he executed the restoration work of erecting the Main tower (Raja Gopuram) of this temple located in his birthplace Mappedu and also renovated the shrine of Veerabaaleeswarar in this temple.

== Mythical importance ==
1. In Mythology, Vishnu appeared in the form of 'Mohini' (special avatar) to share the nectar obtained by the Devas from the sea named Thiruppaarkadal and recognized the two Asuras who were with them and killed the Asuras. Incarnated as Mohini, he worshiped Shiva at Meippedu (now Mappedu) area of this temple location to regain his true form. That is why this place was known as 'Meippedu' (Mei in Tamil - truth; pedu in Tamil - form) and later as 'Mappedu'.
2. During the period of Ramayana, Hanuman came to this place, in search of lost Sita, without knowing her hidden place, he played the Amritvarshini on the veena in this temple area. Hearing the melody, Shiva in the form of Singeeswarar appeared in front of him and directed him to go to Sri Lanka for searching Sita.
3. When Shiva was performing Ananda Tandava at Thiruvalangadu, one of his pancha sabha sthalams, Nandi Devar named Singhi played Mridangam there. Because Nandi devar sat blindfolded due to his preoccupation with the mridangam, he was unable to experience the blissful dance of Shiva. Therefore, Nandi devar explained his condition to Shiva and requested Him to see Shiva's dance again. Shiva again performed Ananda Tandava for him at the temple area, presently Mappedu called Meippedu earlier and blessed him. Shiva is called Singeeswarar because He blessed Nandi named Singhi.

== Importance of Tamil ==
Shiva gifted tha Tamil alphabet 'nga' to sage Agastya. Later Agastya, in this temple, shared this knowledge with sage Sudha Budha who introduced the alphabet to the world.

== Sub deities ==
Aadhikesava Perumal with His consorts goddess Sridevi and goddess Boodevi, Veerabaaleeswarar, Durga, Chandikeswarar, Asthaana Vinayaka, Subramanian with His consorts Valli and Devasena, Veena Anjaneya, Sun and Kaala Bhairava are the sub deities in this temple.
