= USS Hamul =

Cargo ship of the United States Navy

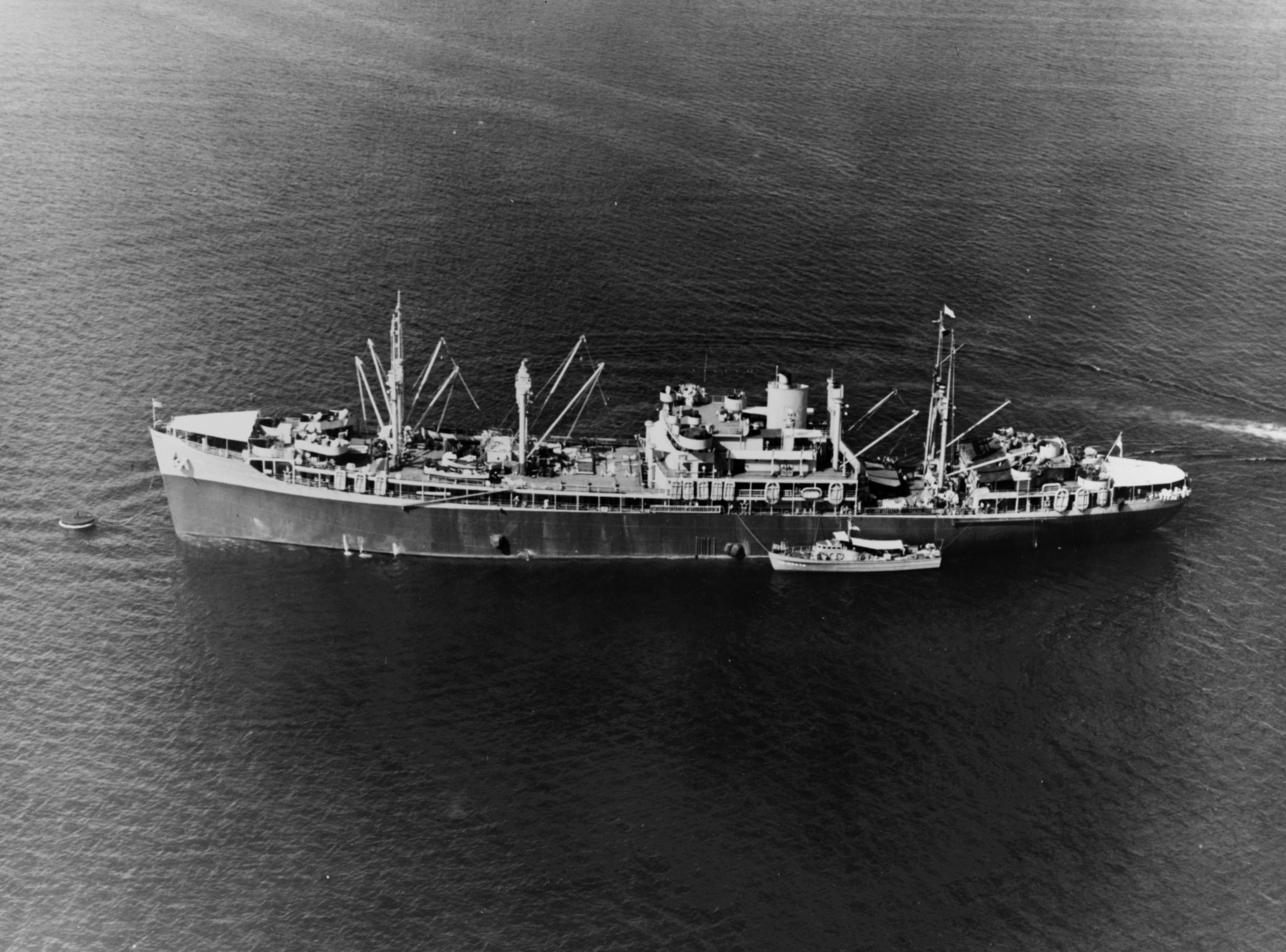
- Hamul at anchor in Great Sound, Bermuda, on 15 July 1944

History

United States
- Name: USS Hamul
- Builder: Federal Shipbuilding and Drydock Company, Kearny, New Jersey
- Laid down: 6 March 1940, as SS Sea Panther
- Launched: 6 April 1940
- Commissioned: 14 June 1941, as USS Hamul
- Decommissioned: 9 June 1962
- Reclassified: AK-30 (Cargo ship), 14 June 1941; AD-20 (Destroyer tender), 7 January 1943
- Fate: Transferred to the Maritime Administration, 25 September 1962; Sold for scrapping, 16 October 1975

General characteristics
- Class & type: Hamul-class destroyer tender
- Displacement: 8,560 long tons (8,697 t) light; 18,900 long tons (19,203 t) full
- Length: 492 ft (150 m)
- Beam: 69 ft (21 m)
- Draft: 28 ft 6 in (8.69 m)
- Propulsion: Geared turbine, 8,500 shp (6,338 kW), single propeller
- Speed: 17 knots (31 km/h; 20 mph)
- Complement: 857 officers and enlisted
- Armament: 1 × 5"/38 caliber gun; 4 × 3"/50 caliber guns; 2 × twin 40 mm gun mounts; 8 × twin 20 mm gun mounts

Service record
- Operations: World War II; Korean War
- Awards: 1 battle star (WWII); 1 battle star (Korea)

USS Hamul (AD-20) was the lead ship of a class of two destroyer tenders; she was most likely named after Hamal, the brightest star in the constellation Aries.

Laid down on 6 March 1940 as SS Sea Panther, a Maritime Commission type (C3 Cargo) hull under Maritime Commission contract (MC hull 40) by the Federal Shipbuilding & Drydock Company of Kearney, New Jersey. Launched in April 1940 she was delivered to the Lykes Brothers Steamship Company of New Orleans and renamed Doctor Lykes. After two trips to the Orient she was acquired by the United States Navy and commissioned as a cargo ship, USS Hamul (AK-30), on 14 June 1941 at Charleston, South Carolina.

== Service history ==
=== Cargo ship, 1941–1942 ===
In July 1941, Hamul rendered logistical support for the occupation of Iceland, prior to America's involvement in World War II. After working with General Electric in experiments on night camouflage, Hamul departed Boston in January, 1942 to head a convoy of five ships with men and material to establish a base at Bora Bora, Society Islands. This mission completed, the cargo ship returned to the States via Chile, while she loaded 10,000 tons of nitrate. Hamul discharged the valuable cargo at Mobile, Alabama and remained there for conversion to a destroyer tender.

=== Destroyer tender ===
==== 1943–1946 ====
Departing Mobile 7 January 1943 redesignated as AD-20, Hamul tended destroyers and other ships in Casco Bay, Maine until April and then sailed south to serve as flagship of the Destroyer-Escort Shakedown Task Group in Bermuda. In the following 19 months she tended some 348 DD's as well as removing demolition charges from U-505. This German submarine was the first capture of a regular enemy warship on the high seas by the U.S. Navy since 1815.

After overhaul at the Brooklyn Navy Yard, Hamul sailed for the Pacific 1 January 1945 reaching Saipan 12 February via the Panama Canal, Pearl Harbor, and Eniwetok. She remained there preparing amphibious craft for the massive Iwo Jima invasion until 27 March, when she sailed to Ulithi. At Ulithi Hamul kept busy repairing damaged craft returning from the Okinawa campaign until 6 May, when she sailed for the scene of the Pacific war's last major struggle. Hamul reached Okinawa on 10 May 1945 and remained there until February, 1946 to repair battle-damaged ships. With over 400 homeward bound veterans aboard, she departed Okinawa 10 February 1946. After discharging them at San Diego she proceeded to Jacksonville, Florida and subsequently Orange, Texas to prepare for decommissioning.

==== 1946–1962 ====
As Hamul entered the final stages of the decommissioning process, she was called back into active service as station ship at Plymouth, England. Reaching the British port on 17 April 1947, Hamul remained there for three years tending various American ships and making quarterly cruises to Atlantic and Mediterranean ports. Again ordered to decommission, Hamul departed Plymouth on 17 July 1950, but the outbreak of war in Korea again called for every available ship. Going west via Norfolk, Virginia, Hamul reached Sasebo, Japan on 23 October and began servicing the fleet operating off the Korean coast.

From that period on Hamul's career fell into a pattern of six months duty in the East, which took her to the Philippines, Hong Kong, Formosa, and other Asian ports and islands, alternating with a similar period of time in her home port, Long Beach. During the active fighting in Korea and the Cold War afterwards, she played a vital role in maintaining America's mobile presence in the Pacific. Hamul (AD-20) decommissioned on 9 June 1962 at Long Beach. Returned to the Maritime Administration, she was placed in the National Defense Reserve Fleet at Suisun Bay in Benicia, California.

Hamul earned one battle star for World War II service and one battle star for Korean War service.
