= Arangulanathar Temple =

Shiva temple in Pudukkottai district, Tamil Nadu, India

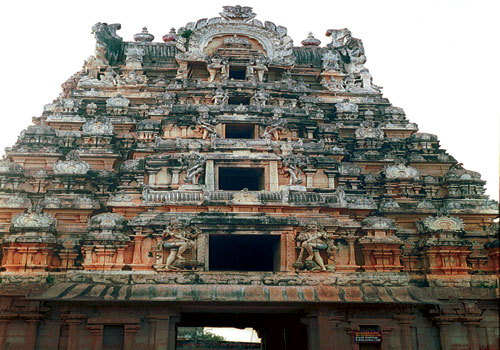
- Arangulanathar Temple, Thiruvarangulam, Pudukkottai district, Tamil Nadu

- Arangulanathar Temple, Thiruvarangulam, Pudukkottai district, Tamil Nadu

Religion
- Affiliation: Hinduism
- District: Pudukkottai
- Deity: Arangulanathar (Haratheerthiswarar)
- Festivals: Maha Shivaratri, Vaikasi Visakam, Aadi Pooram

Location
- Location: Thiruvarangulam
- State: Tamil Nadu
- Country: India
- Interactive map of Arangulanathar Temple
- Coordinates: 10.3562°N 78.8737°E

Architecture
- Type: Dravidian architecture
- Completed

Specifications
- Temple: One
- Elevation: 119.67 m (393 ft)

Arangulanathar Temple is a Shiva temple in Thiruvarangulam neighbourhood of Pudukkottai district of Tamil Nadu, India. This temple is also called as 'Haratheerthiswarar temple'. The main deity in this temple is Arangulanathar and the goddess is Brahadhambal (Periyanayaki). There is a mandap in this temple with 100 pillars. This temple is one of the Tevaram Vaippu Sthalams mentioned in one of Sambandar's patika.

== Location ==
Arangulanathar temple is located with the coordinates of (10.3562°N 78.8737°E) at Thiruvarangulam.

Arangulanathar Temple (Tamil Nadu)

== Sub deities ==
Vishnu, Saraswati, Sitrambalam udaiyar, Nataraja, Dakshinamurti with musical instrument veena, Chandikeswarar, Porpanai Ganesha, Shanmuganathar with His consorts Valli and Devasena, Appar, Sambandar, Sundarar, Manikkavacakar and 63 Nayanars are the sub deities in this temple.
