= Tirundudevankudi Karkadeswarar Temple =

Hindu temple in Thanjavur district, Tamil Nadu, India

Tirundudevankudi Karkadeswarar Temple(திருந்துதேவன்குடி கற்கடகேசுவரர் கோயில்) is a Hindu temple located at Tirundudevankudi in Thanjavur district of Tamil Nadu, India. The historical name of the place is Karkteeswaram and Nandankoil. The presiding deity is Shiva. He is called as Karkadeswarar. His consort is known as Apoorvanayaki.

== Significance ==
It is one of the shrines of the 275 Paadal Petra Sthalams - Shiva Sthalams glorified in the early medieval Tevaram poems by Tamil Saivite Nayanar Tirugnanasambandar.

== Mythology ==
According to Hindu mythology, the sage Durvasa once cursed a gandharva to be born as a crab in the world. However, feeling sorry for the crab, Durvasa, however, assured him that he might regain his actual form in the next birth if he meditated upon Shiva. Worshipping Shiva with utmost devotion in order to be guaranteed of a human birth in the next life, the crab incurred the jealousy of Indra who tried to kill him with a sword. However, at that instant, a hole manifested on the surface of the linga enabling the crab to escape.

== Literary Mention ==
Tirungnanasambandar describes the feature of the deity as:

விண்ணுலா வும்நெறி வீடுகாட் டும்நெறி

மண்ணுலா வும்நெறி மயக்கந்தீர்க் கும்நெறி
தெண்ணிலா வெண்மதி தீண்டுதே வன்குடி

அண்ணலா னேறுடை அடிகள்வே டங்களே.
