= Korukkai Brahma Gnana Pureeswarar Temple =

Hindu temple in Tamil Nadu, India

- Brahma Gnana Pureeswarar Temple, Keellha Korukkai, Thanjavur, Tamil Nadu

Religion
- Affiliation: Hinduism
- District: Thanjavur
- Deity: Brahma Gnana Pureeswarar
- Festival: Maha Shivaratri

Location
- Location: Keellha Korukkai
- State: Tamil Nadu
- Country: India
- Interactive map of Korukkai Brahma Gnana Pureeswarar Temple
- Coordinates: 10.928851°N 79.382955°E

Architecture
- Type: Dravidian architecture
- Creator: Kulothunga III
- Completed: 1,500 years ago

Specifications
- Temple: One
- Inscriptions: found
- Elevation: 50.41 m (165 ft)

Brahma Gnana Pureeswarar Temple is a Shiva temple in Tamil Nadu, India. The main deity in this temple is Brahma Gnana Pureeswarar and goddess is Pushpavalli alias Pushpambigai. There are two Nandis, one found in front of the shrine of the main deity and the other found in front of the shrine of the goddess of this temple. The temple pond is named 'Chandra Pushkarani'.

This temple was built by Kulothunga Chollha III about 1,500 years ago.

== Location ==
This temple is located at Korukkai (also called as Keellha Korukkai), at about 5 km from Kumbakonam on the Patteeswaram - Mullhaiyur road, in Thanjavur of Tamil Nadu state, with the coordinates of (10.928851°N 79.382955°E).

Korukkai Brahma Gnana Pureeswarar Temple (Tamil Nadu)

== Mythical importance ==
There were two Asuras viz., Madhu and Kaidapa. They snatched Vedas from Brahma and hid them under sea. Brahma approached Vishnu for help to get back the Vedas. Vishnu incarnated and killed the Asuras and handed over the Vedas back to Brahma. Even after getting back the Vedas, Brahma could not regain his memory about the knowledge of Vedas and about the creation. So he went again to meet Vishnu regarding this. Vishnu suggested him to visit the Shiva temple at Keellha Korukkai, to bathe in the Chandra Pushkarani and to go step by step around the temple (Adi pradakshina) by worshipping Shiva. Brahma did so with his consort Saraswati. Pleased with their prayers, Shiva restored his lost memories and the knowledge of Vedas.

== Sub deities ==
Ardhanarishvara, Kirata murti, Brahma, Saraswati, Saptaswara Vinayaka, Subramanian with His consorts Valli and Devasena, Sun, Moon, Saturn, Adhikaara Nandi and Bhairava are the sub deities in this temple.
