= Sade Sati =

When Saturn passes over the natal moon

In Hindu astrology, Sade-Sati (IAST: sāḍhe-sātī) is the 7 1/2 years long period of Shani (Saturn). This is a period with many challenges, but also a time of great achievements and recognition.

== Start and end ==
=== Traditional calculation ===
The period of Sade-sati starts when Saturn enters the zodiac sign immediately before the zodiac sign of Moon at the time of the birth of the individual. That is, if the Moon sign (Ayamsha) at the time of birth of the native was Taurus, then the Sadesati will begin when Saturn enters sign Aries. The Sadesati will continue while Saturn transits over this sign and the next two signs, i.e. the birth sign and the sign after it. Saturn spends around 2 1/2 years in each sign. To cross these three signs it takes about 7 1/2 years. Thus the name Sadesati which literally means seven and a half.

=== Alternate calculation ===
Of all transits in traditional Indian, Vedic astrology, which is based on the sidereal zodiac as against the tropical zodiac, Saturn transit is a solely emotional / mental transit. In that, it is the only transit that affects the emotions. In some ways of computation, Sade Sati is said to begin when the Saturn is transiting the asterism 45 degrees prior to the position of the natal moon and ends when Saturn transits the asterism 45 degrees past the position of the natal moon.

Using the same example, if someone is born with Moon at 3 degrees in sign of Taurus, SadeSati may be assumed to begin, when Saturn is transiting 18 degrees of Pisces (in the asterism of Revati). This would mean that Sade Sati ends when Saturn transits 18 degrees in Gemini / Mithuna.

== Popular remedies ==
It is believed that worshipping Lord Hanuman and Lord Ganesha greatly reduces any malefic effects of Sade Sati.

Sadesati is a concentrated period of the repayment of karmic debts from the past. Depending on one's birth chart, it can bestow benefits and achievements and take one to heights, or it can utterly destroy a person's material life but with the purpose of uplifting spiritually. It could also be moderate with mixed results. It all depends on one's birth chart and the dynamics of planetary movements.

According to folk astrologers of Vedic astrology this is a troublesome time for the individual who is going through it. There may be a lot of challenges in a person's life. If Saturn is ill-placed in bad houses, he may face challenges that reflect this bad placement. However, there's another school of astrology that believes that though the sadesati period is challenging, it is not as damaging as folk astrologers claim and that many people achieve great success during the period of Sadesati. For example, Jawaharlal Nehru, Trump and Modi all became head of states during Sade Sati.

Saturn, the karaka for hard work, discipline, old age and authority, will show results based on how the individual has lived his/her life up till that point. If the person has been disciplined and worked hard, this is the moment Saturn shows its rewards. Sade sati's heaviest challenges during this time, and how the individual deals with it, sets the tone for the next 22.5 years as Saturn starts to move around the twelve houses again.

The impact of Sadesati is supposed to be felt differently by people of different moon signs. It is said that people of Moon sign Aquarius do not have any ill effects from Sadesati, while people of Sun sign Leo feel the most malefic impact because Saturn considers the Sun, the ruler of Leo, to be its bitter enemy..

Along the same lines, even as Saturn is considered the ruler of Kanya / Virgo or even Makara / Capricornus, in both these signs it transits through Uthram asterism and Uttarashada asterism respectively. These are asterisms ruled by Sun and even while it is popularly believed that people born with the natal moon in these signs do not face significant challenges in SadeSati, it remains that Saturn is more uncomfortable in the signs / asterisms ruled by planets considered inimical to it, and Saturn is considered inimical to the Sun, in part due to the stark contrast between their astronomical natures themselves, but also the popular Indian mythology surrounding the origins of the enmity.

Sade Sati is divided into three phases called Rising, Peak and Setting and the results of Sade Sati varies as per the phase native is going through.

Vedic astrology also prescribes certain remedies and mantras that can be recited to please the lord Saturn and limit the effect of Saturn's Sadesati. remedies also include prayers to Lord Ganapathy or Vigneswara, and Hanuman or Anjaneya.

Another related astrological transit of Saturn is the Dhaiyya (2.5 years), also known as Small Panoti (Small Trouble), and Kantakshani, or Ashtamshani. This transit of Saturn occurs when the Saturn is transiting through the 4th sign from the birth Moon sign (Kantak Shani), or from the 8th sign from the birth moon sign (Ashtamshani) or 7th house from Natal Moon (Kantak Shani).

Vedic astrology says that these three are hazardous periods, though not as much as the Sade-sati.

Negative outcomes of shani dhaiya gives State of disgrace or loss of self-respect, Lack of prosperity, effort that does not accomplish its intended purpose in time, loses consistently, inability to discharge debts as they come due, loss of ability to function normally, disposed to psychological variability and having difficulty in coping with personal relationships, destroys the peace or tranquility, mental and physical health ailments.

Remedies to the planet, in India, differ vastly across regions. In North India, and in much of India, Lord Hanuman is worshipped. Specifically Hanuman Chalisa is a considered one of the most potent remedies against SadeSati. Lord Hanuman is considered an avtar of Lord Shiva by some. Hence worship to Lord Shiva is also recommended.

In South India, while the Iyers / Shaivites worship Hanuman, many Iyengars / Vaishnavites, also worship Garuda, Lord Narasimha (e.g. Sri Sanaiscara krta Sri Narasimha Stuti) as one of the remedies for SadeSati.

Many Palakkad Iyers believe that worshipping Lord Ayappa for a Mandala (45 days) is a potent remedy as well in that it is believed that Lord Ayappa shows his beneficence by reducing the suffering for just a Mandala.

Chanting of Vishnu Sahasranamam, Garuda Pattu (10 liner to Garuda, the King among Birds) and other hymns like Sani Vajra Panjara Kavacham are also considered effective remedies.

Fasting is said to please Lord Saturn, especially on the day he rules (Saturday). Hence some remedies recommend fasting on Saturdays.

Saturn transit being a predominantly mental / emotional transit, as stated above, it follows that worship of Lord Shiva, the prognosticator of emotional / mental health, is strongly recommended with the preferred prayer being the Mahamrityunjaya Mantra Japa.

Many people light lamps with sesame oil as a remedy. Others donate sesame oil, pulses like urad (as a remedy to Lord Hanuman) and other forms of charity to under privileged people as a form of remedy.

Donation to handicapped people, those handicapped in the leg, more than anything else, lepers and generally sections of society that are shunned, looked down on, segregated against, are considered the highest forms of remedy to Saturn.

The genesis for this, is in the mythology surrounding the origins of how Saturn is viewed as a planet that "walks" with a limp and hence is the slowest moving planet in the traditional zodiac, in which Saturn is the outermost planet and other astral bodies are ignored for purposes of astrological interpretation. This mythology is outlined below:

=== Mythology surrounding origin of Saturn ===
It is said that Sun's wife Savitri unable to bear his effulgence put a doppelganger in her place and went away to her parents' place for sometime. This doppelganger was Chhaya with whom Sun parented Saturn. The agreement between Savitri and Chaya was that she would not bear progeny which was violated by Chaya. On Savitri, knowing about this, she returned, took her place back, and sired Yama (Lord of Death) and Yamuna with Sun. As a step mother, she was not particularly kind to Saturn. Yama, is said to have hit Saturn in the leg leading to a limp, apart from a life of deliberate isolation, insult and humiliation.

On Savitri's influence, Sun gave Yama the lordship over one's Karmas and hence he became the Lord of Death and gave his daughter the status of one of the most exalted rivers in India, on par with Ganges. On realizing that something was amiss about how Saturn was being treated, he realized the truth and made up for his mistake by making Saturn the lord of Karma in one's astrological chart. The difference between Saturn and Yama is that Saturn is said to govern and give the results of one's good and bad karma during one's lifetime while Lord Yama does that after the end of the life.

It is on account of Saturn having experienced a harsh childhood, not due to the Sun, that Saturn and the Sun do not get along, are considered astrologically warring planets, and are interpreted as such when found in the same constellation on a birth chart.

== Notes and references ==
- Elements of Vedic Astrology

Remedies include offering milk to Lord Shiva and helping underprivileged persons, especially on Saturdays.
