= Theeyathur Sahasralakshmeeswarar Temple =

Hindu temple in Pudukkottai district, Tamil Nadu, India

- Sahasralakshmeeswarar Temple, Theeyathur, Pudukkottai, Tamil Nadu

Religion
- Affiliation: Hinduism
- District: Pudukkottai
- Deity: Sahasralakshmeeswarar
- Festival: Maha Shivaratri

Location
- Location: Theeyathur
- State: Tamil Nadu
- Country: India
- Interactive map of Theeyathur Sahasralakshmeeswarar Temple
- Coordinates: 9.9167°N 79.0737°E

Architecture
- Type: Dravidian architecture
- Completed

Specifications
- Temple: One
- Elevation: 32.26 m (106 ft)

Sahasralakshmeeswarar Temple is a Shiva temple situated at Theeyathur alias Theeyathur Vadakottai neighbourhood in Pudukkottai district of Tamil Nadu state in India. The main deity is Sahasralakshmeeswarar and goddess is Periyanayaki in this temple. Sun and Agni worshipped the mai deity here.

== Location ==
This temple is located with the coordinates of 9.9167°N 79.0737°E at Theeyathur in Pudukkottai district.

== History ==
Lord Vishnu had the habit of performing pooja for Shiva every day. One day he tried to do so with 1,000 (sahasram) lotus flowers. On doing so, he had observed that there was a shortage of one flower. So, he decided to perform the pooja by fulfilling the shortage by one of His eyes as a flower. So he intended to pluck off his eyes. On doing so, Shiva appeared in front of Him and prevented Him to pluck off the eye. On hearing this incident, goddess Mahalakshmi also had the intention of the darshan of Shiva. As per the suggestions from Sage Agastya, Mahalakshmi performed pooja for Shiva with 1,000 flowers. Shiva was delighted by the pooja and gave darshan to Mahalakshmi in this place. Thereafter He stayed here in this place for the darshan of devotees also and named as Sahasralakshmeeswarar.

== Mythical belief ==
Divine sculptor Viswakarma, Sage Agir Budhan, Sage Agni Purandhaks and Sage Angirasa who were born in Uthirattadhi nakshatra, in their invisible forms, are believed to perform Homam every month on the star of Uthirattadhi, in this temple where Mahalakshmi worshipped Shiva with 1,000 lotus flowers.

== Sub deities ==
Brahma, Dakshinamurti, Lingothbavar, Chandikeswarar, Vancha Ganapathy, Ganesha, Subramanian with His consorts Valli and Devasena, Nandi, Sun, Moon, Navagraha, Bhairava and Nāga are the sub deities in this temple.
