= Beta Arietis =

Binary star system in the constellation Aries

β Arietis
- Location of β Arietis (circled)

Observation data Epoch J2000 Equinox ICRS
- Constellation: Aries
- Right ascension: 01^{h} 54^{m} 38.41099^{s}
- Declination: +20° 48′ 28.9133″
- Apparent magnitude (V): 2.655 (2.712 + 5.789)

Characteristics
- Spectral type: A3V + G2V
- U−B color index: +0.170
- B−V color index: +0.142

Astrometry
Radial velocity (R_{v})	−1.9±0.9 km/s
Proper motion (μ)	RA: +98.74 mas/yr Dec.: −110.41 mas/yr
Parallax (π)	55.827±0.308 mas
Distance	58.4 ± 0.3 ly (17.91 ± 0.10 pc)
Absolute magnitude (M_{V})	1.382 (1.444 + 4.521)

Orbit
Name	Beta Arietis B
Period (P)	0.292941±0.000019 yr
Semi-major axis (a)	0.638±0.006 AU
Eccentricity (e)	0.8801±0.0008
Inclination (i)	47.5±0.5°
Longitude of the node (Ω)	83.3±0.3°
Periastron epoch (T)	B 1981.559
Argument of periastron (ω) (secondary)	204.9±0.3°

Details

A
Mass	2.067±0.057 M_{☉}
Radius	2.125 (Note: Calculated from angular diameters in milliarcseconds (1.0819 and 0.549 mas) and distance in kpc (0.01827 kpc) given in Furio et al. (2025).) R_{☉}
Luminosity	20.9+5.4 −4.3 L_{☉}
Surface gravity (log g)	4.0 cgs
Temperature	8,759 K
Metallicity [Fe/H]	0.16 dex
Rotational velocity (v sin i)	73 km/s
Age	630 Myr

B
Mass	1.058±0.026 M_{☉}
Radius	1.078 R_{☉}
Luminosity	1.29+0.16 −0.14 L_{☉}
Temperature	5,811 K
Age	630 Myr

Other designations
- Sheratan, Sharatan, Al Sharatain, 6 Arietis, BD+20°306, FK5 66, GJ 80, HD 11636, HIP 8903, HR 553, SAO 75012

Database references
SIMBAD	data
ARICNS	data

Beta Arietis is a binary star system in the constellation of Aries, marking the ram's second horn. Its identifier is a Bayer designation that is Latinized from β Arietis, and abbreviated Beta Ari or β Ari. It has the official name Sheratan, pronounced /ˈʃɛrətæn/. This system is visible to the naked eye as a point of light with a combined apparent visual magnitude of 2.65, making this the second-brightest star in the constellation. Located at a distance of 58.4 light-years (17.9 pc), the pair orbit each other with a period of 107 days.

== Nomenclature ==
Beta Arietis is the star's Bayer designation. It also bears the Flamsteed designation 6 Arietis.

The traditional name, Sheratan (or Sharatan, Sheratim), in full Al Sharatan, is from the Arabic الشرطان aš-šaraţān "the two signs", a reference to the star having marked the northern vernal equinox together with Gamma Arietis several thousand years ago. In 2016, the International Astronomical Union organized a Working Group on Star Names (WGSN) to catalogue and standardize proper names for stars. The WGSN approved the name Sheratan for this star on August 21, 2016 and it is now so entered in the IAU Catalog of Star Names.

In Chinese, 婁宿 (Lóu Xiù), meaning Bond (asterism), refers to an asterism consisting of β Arietis, γ Arietis and α Arietis. Consequently, the Chinese name for β Arietis itself is 婁宿一 (Lóu Su yī, English: the First Star of Bond).

== Properties ==
Beta Arietis has an apparent visual magnitude of 2.65. Based on dynamical parallax measurements, it is located at a distance of 58.4 light-years (17.9 parsecs) from Earth. This is a spectroscopic binary star system consisting of a pair of stars orbiting around each other with a separation that can not currently be resolved with a conventional telescope. However, the pair have been resolved using the Mark III Stellar Interferometer at the Mount Wilson Observatory. This allows the orbital elements to be computed, as well as the individual masses of the two stars. The stars complete their highly elliptical orbit every 107 days.

The primary star has a stellar classification of A3 V, which means it is an A-type main-sequence star that is generating energy through the thermonuclear fusion of hydrogen in its core region. The NStars project gives the star a spectral type of kA4 hA5 mA5 Va under the revised MK spectral classification system. The secondary star is a G-type main-sequence star, with a stellar classification of G2V. It is about four magnitudes fainter than the primary; hence the energy output from the system is dominated by the primary star. In a few million years, as the primary evolves toward a red giant, significant amounts of mass transfer to the secondary component is expected.

The primary has been classified as a rapid rotator, with a projected rotational velocity of 73 km/s providing a lower bound on the azimuthal rotational velocity along the equator. It may also be a mildly Am star, which is a class of stars that show a peculiar spectrum with strong absorption lines from various elements and deficiencies in others. In β Arietis, these absorption lines are broadened because of the Doppler effect from the rotation, making analysis of the abundance patterns difficult.

This system has been examined with the Spitzer Space Telescope for the presence of an excess emission of infrared, which would indicate a disk of dust. However, no significant excess was detected.
