= Hamal =

Star in the constellation Aries

- Location of α Arietis (circled)

Observation data Epoch J2000 Equinox ICRS
- Constellation: Aries
- Right ascension: 02^{h} 07^{m} 10.40570^{s}
- Declination: +23° 27′ 44.7032″
- Apparent magnitude (V): 2.00

Characteristics
- Evolutionary stage: red giant branch (78% chance)
- Spectral type: K2-IIIbCa-1
- U−B color index: +1.13
- B−V color index: +1.15
- V−R color index: +0.7
- R−I color index: +0.62
- Variable type: Suspected

Astrometry
| Radial velocity (R_{v}) | −14.2±0.9 km/s |
| Proper motion (μ) | RA: +188.55 mas/yr Dec.: −148.08 mas/yr |
| Parallax (π) | 49.56±0.25 mas |
| Distance | 65.8 ± 0.3 ly (20.2 ± 0.1 pc) |
| Absolute magnitude (M_{V}) | +0.47±0.04 |

Details
| Mass | 1.43±0.08 M_{☉} |
| Radius | 15.19±0.10 R_{☉} |
| Luminosity | 76.2±0.8 L_{☉} |
| Surface gravity (log g) | 2.3 cgs |
| Temperature | 4,553±15 K |
| Metallicity [Fe/H] | −0.214 dex |
| Rotational velocity (v sin i) | 3.44 km/s |
| Age | 3.4±1.9 Gyr |

Other designations
- Hemal, Hamal, Ras Hammel, El Nath, Arietis, α Ari, Alpha Arietis, Alpha Ari, 13 Arietis, 13 Ari, BD+22 306, FK5 74, GC 2538, GJ 84.3, GJ 9072, HD 12929, HIP 9884, HR 617, SAO 75151, PPM 91373, LTT 10711, NLTT 7032

Database references
| SIMBAD | data |

Hamal, /ˈhæməl/, is a star in the northern zodiacal constellation of Aries. It has the Bayer designation Alpha Arietis, which is Latinized from α Arietis and abbreviated Alpha Ari or α Ari. This star is visible to the naked eye with an apparent visual magnitude of 2.0. Hamal is the brightest star in the constellation and, on average, the 50th-brightest star in the night sky. Based upon parallax measurements made with the Hipparcos astrometry satellite, Hamal is about 65.8 light-years (20.2 parsecs) from Earth. It is drifting closer to the Sun with a radial velocity of −14 km/s.

This is an aging giant star that is likely to host an orbiting planet with a mass greater than Jupiter.

== Nomenclature ==
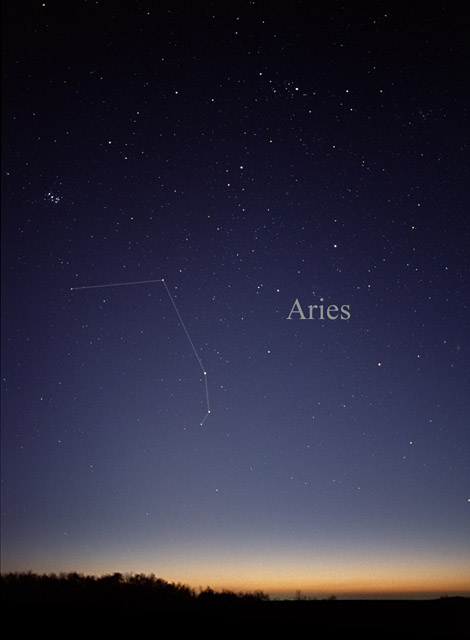
Hamal is the brightest star in the constellation of Aries.

Alpha Arietis is the star's Bayer designation. It also bears the Flamsteed designation of 13 Arietis.

The traditional name Hamal (also written Hemal, Hamul, Ras Hammel) derives from the Arabic رأس الحمل rās al-ħamal "head of the ram", in turn from the name for the constellation as a whole, Al Ħamal "the ram". In 2016, the International Astronomical Union organized a Working Group on Star Names (WGSN) to catalog and standardize proper names for stars. The WGSN's first bulletin of July 2016 included a table of the first two batches of names approved by the WGSN; which included Hamal for this star.

Another Arabic name, El Nath or Alnath meaning "the butting [horns]", was historically used for this star, including by Geoffrey Chaucer, but it is now associated with Beta Tauri.

In Chinese, 婁宿 (Lóu Su), meaning Bond (asterism), refers to an asterism consisting of Hamal, β Arietis and γ Arietis. Consequently, the Chinese name for Hamal itself is 婁宿三 (Lóu Su sān, English: the Third Star of Bond).

== Properties ==
The spectrum of this star matches a stellar classification of K2 III Ca-1, with the luminosity class of III indicating that it is an evolved giant star that has exhausted the supply of hydrogen at its core and is now on the red-giant branch. The 'Ca-1' portion of the classification indicates that it shows weaker than normal lines of calcium in its spectrum. Since 1943, the spectrum of this star has served as one of the stable anchor points by which other stars are classified. It is estimated to have 43% more mass than the Sun, while interferometric measurements using the Navy Precision Optical Interferometer show it to be about 15 times larger in diameter. Despite its enlarged girth, this star is still spinning with a slightly faster equatorial azimuthal velocity than the Sun, having a projected rotational velocity of 3.44 km s^{−1}.

Hamal is radiating about 91 times the Sun's luminosity from its outer envelope at an effective temperature of 4,373 K. This is cooler than the surface of the Sun, giving it the orange-hued glow of a K-type star. It is suspected to be slightly variable, with an amplitude of 0.06 magnitude. The abundance of elements other than hydrogen and helium, what astronomers term the star's metallicity, is only around 60% that in the Sun. (Note: The abundance is estimated by taking [Fe/H] to the power of ten: 10^{[Fe/H]} = 10^{−0.214} = 0.61) The star displays low amplitude pulsations with periods of 0.571 and 0.190 days.

== Planetary system ==
In 2011, the likely presence of a planet in orbit around this star was reported by Byeong-Cheol Lee, et al. It was detected using the radial velocity method, based upon measurements made between 2003 and 2010 at the Bohyunsan Optical Astronomy Observatory in South Korea. The object has an orbital period of 381 days and an eccentricity of 0.25. The lower bound on this object's mass is about 1.8 times the mass of Jupiter. The estimated semi-major axis of the planet's orbit is 1.2 astronomical units (AU), which would give it a periapsis distance of 0.9 AU and an apoapsis distance of 1.5 AU. By comparison, the star has a radius of 0.07 AU. (Note: For a = 1.2 AU and e = 0.25, the periapsis is given by a x (1 - e) = 9 AU and the apoapsis is a x (1 + e) = 15 AU. The solar radius is 0.0046491 AU, so the star's radius is 14.9 x 0.0046491 = 0.069 AU.)

The Hamal planetary system
| Companion (in order from star) | Mass | Semimajor axis (AU) | Orbital period (days) | Eccentricity | Inclination (°) | Radius |
|---|---|---|---|---|---|---|
| b | ≥1.8±0.2 M_{J} | 1.2 | 380.8±0.3 | 0.25±0.03 | — | — |

== In culture ==
Hamal's orientation with relation to the Earth's orbit around the Sun gives it a certain importance not apparent from its modest brightness. Between 2000 and 100 BCE, the apparent path of the Sun through the Earth's sky placed it in Aries at the northern vernal equinox, the point in time marking the start of spring in the Northern Hemisphere. This is why most astrology columns in modern newspapers begin with Aries. While the vernal equinox has moved to Pisces since then due to precession of the equinoxes, Hamal has remained in mind as a bright star near what was apparently an important place when people first studied the night sky. Currently (epoch J2000) its declination is almost exactly equal to the latitude of the Tropic of Cancer, meaning it can be used to find the position of that imaginary line when the Sun is not nearby.

Another spelling of Hamal, Hamul, was used for the name of a U.S. Navy ship, USS Hamul.

In 1953, a fictional planet orbiting Alpha Arietis, named Lithia, appeared in A Case of Conscience, a classic science fiction novel by James Blish. The planet serves as the arena of the major part of the story, being a homeworld to a fictional sentient race, being studied by humans. No real-life equivalent of Lithia is known.

== See also ==
- List of nearest giant stars – including Hamal
- List of proper names of stars – including Hamal
- List of exoplanets and planetary debris around giant stars
