= Edayathumangalam Mangalyeswarar Temple =

Shiva temple in Tiruchirappalli district, Tamil Nadu, India

- Mangalyeswarar Temple, Edayathumangalam, Tiruchirappalli district, Tamil Nadu

Religion
- Affiliation: Hinduism
- District: Tiruchirappalli
- Deity: Mangalyeswarar
- Festivals: Maha Shivaratri, Panguni Uthiram, Ganesh Chaturthi, Thiruvathira, Navaratri, Karthika Deepam

Location
- Location: Edayathumangalam
- State: Tamil Nadu
- Country: India
- Interactive map of Edayathumangalam Mangalyeswarar Temple
- Coordinates: 10.853845°N 78.807845°E

Architecture
- Type: Dravidian architecture
- Completed

Specifications
- Temple: One
- Elevation: 86.17 m (283 ft)

Mangalyeswarar Temple is a Shiva temple at Edayathumangalam, a neighbourhood situated at about 24 km from Tiruchirappalli in Tiruchirappalli district of Tamil Nadu state in India. The main deity in this temple is Mangalyeswarar and the goddess is Mangalambiga.

== Location ==
This temple is located with the coordinates of (10.853845°N 78.807845°E) at Edayathumangalam alias Edayattrumangalam. It is also near to Lalgudi.

Edayathumangalam Mangalyeswarar Temple (Tamil Nadu)

== Mythical importance ==
The legend here is connected with Mangalya Maharishi who was born with Uthiram Natchathara. It was under his aegis, the marriages of Agastya, Vashisht and Sage Bhairava were conducted. He is supposed to have all the powers of his penance in his palms. He is the Acharya of the Angels that bless the marriages. These Angels are believed to be visiting this temple, at the auspicious times that are suitable for marriages, to pray to Mangalyeswarar and re-energise their powers to bless the married with a happy and long married life. It is observed that their blessings are at the peak during Uthiram nakshatra. The celestial wedding of God and Goddess is held during this nakshatra because of this reason.

== Maha Kumbhabhishekams ==
Maha Kumbhabhishekams were held in this temple on 8 March 1990 and on 1 June 2006.

== Festivals ==
Panguni Uthiram, Ganesh Chaturthi, Thiruvathira, Navaratri, Karthika Deepam and Maha Shivaratri are the important festivals celebrated in this temple.

== Sub deities ==
Dakshinamurti, Durga, Nataraja, Ardhanarishvara, Bikshandavar, Chandikeswarar, Brahma, Vinayaka, Subramanian with His consorts Valli and Devasena, Nandi, Mangalya Maharishi, Navagraha and Bhairava are the sub deities in this temple.
