= Gamma Arietis =

Star in the constellation Aries

γ Arietis
- Location of γ Arietis (circled)

Observation data Epoch J2000 Equinox ICRS
- Constellation: Aries
- Right ascension: 01^{h} 53^{m} 31.813^{s}
- Declination: +19° 17′ 37.88″
- Apparent magnitude (V): 3.86 (4.58/4.64)

Characteristics

Gamma^{1} Ari (B)
- Spectral type: A0Vnp λ Boo or A0IV-V(n)kB8
- B−V color index: −0.14

Gamma^{2} Ari (A)
- Spectral type: A2IVpSiSrCr
- B−V color index: −0.03
- Variable type: α^{2} CVn

Astrometry
Radial velocity (R_{v})	+3.7 km/s
Proper motion (μ)	RA: +77.138 mas/yr Dec.: −97.321 mas/yr
Parallax (π)	19.6268±0.1526 mas
Distance	166 ± 1 ly (51.0 ± 0.4 pc)
Absolute magnitude (M_{V})	−0.10

Orbit
Primary	Gamma^{1} Ari
Name	Gamma^{2} Ari
Period (P)	6,600±2,000 yr
Semi-major axis (a)	12.1±2.1″
Eccentricity (e)	0
Inclination (i)	85.23±0.40°
Longitude of the node (Ω)	174.4±1.5°
Periastron epoch (T)	2,259±1,415 JD
Argument of periastron (ω) (secondary)	0°

Details

Gamma^{1} Ari (Ba)
Mass	2.67 M_{☉}
Radius	1.97±0.12 R_{☉}
Luminosity	42.0 L_{☉}
Surface gravity (log g)	4.26 cgs
Temperature	11,000±1,100 K
Rotational velocity (v sin i)	54 km/s
Age	34 Myr

Gamma^{1} Ari (Bb)
Mass	0.7 M_{☉}
Temperature	4,312 K
Metallicity [Fe/H]	−0.5 dex
Rotational velocity (v sin i)	5 km/s

Gamma^{2} Ari (A)
Mass	2.72 M_{☉}
Radius	1.941 R_{☉}
Luminosity	41.5 L_{☉}
Surface gravity (log g)	4.30 cgs
Temperature	10,512 K
Metallicity [Fe/H]	0.43±0.14 dex
Rotational velocity (v sin i)	201 km/s

Other designations
- 5 Ari, BD+18 243, HIP 8832, WDS J01535+1918
- Gamma^{1} Ari (B): HD 11502, HR 545, SAO 92680, WDS J01535+1918B
- Gamma^{2} Ari (A): GC 2291, HD 11503, HR 546, SAO 92681, WDS J01535+1918A

Database references
SIMBAD	γ Ari
- γ^{1} Ari (B)
- γ^{2} Ari (A)

Gamma Arietis is a binary or possibly trinary star system in the northern constellation of Aries. Its name is a Bayer designation that is Latinized from γ Arietis, and abbreviated Gamma Ari or γ Ari. This system is called "The First Star in Aries" as having been at one time the nearest visible star to the equinoctial point. The combined apparent visual magnitude of the stars is 3.86, which is readily visible to the naked eye and makes this the fourth-brightest member of Aries. Based upon parallax measurements, the distance to Gamma Arietis from the Sun is approximately 166 light-years (51 parsecs).

The two components are designated γ^{1} Arietis or Gamma Arietis B and γ^{2} Arietis or Gamma Arietis A. The latter is formally named Mesarthim, pronounced /mɛˈsɑːrθɪm/, the traditional name for the Gamma Arietis system. γ^{1} Arietis may itself be a spectroscopic binary with a low mass companion.

== Properties ==
The double star nature of this system was discovered by the English scientist and astronomer Robert Hooke in 1664. The two components have an angular separation of 7.606 arcseconds, which can be resolved with a small telescope. The orbital period of the pair is roughly 6,600 years.

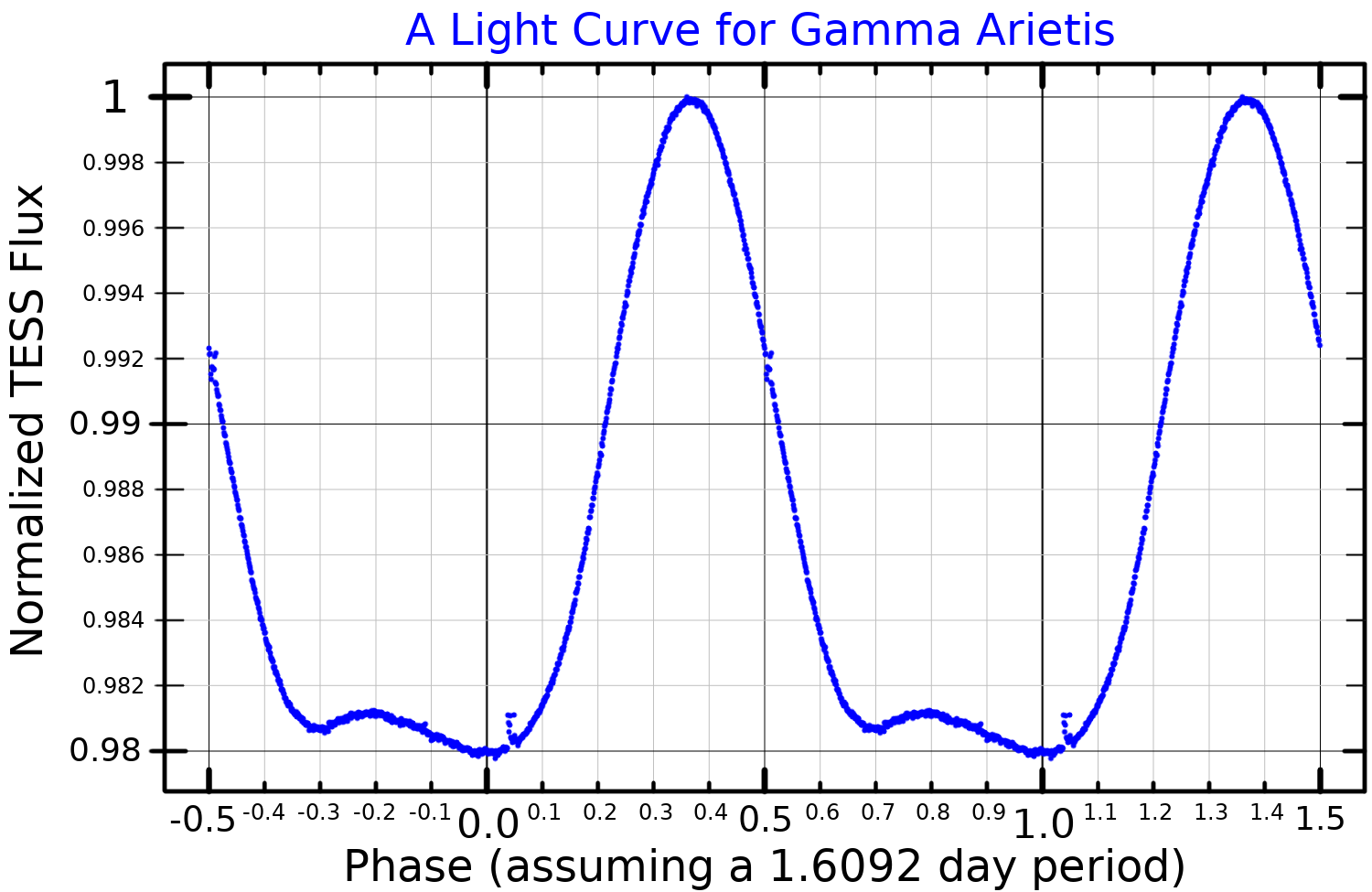
A light curve for Gamma Arietis, plotted from TESS data, folded with a period of 1.6092 days

The brighter component, γ^{2} Arietis, is an α^{2} CVn type variable star, a type of star with a strong magnetic field and enhanced spectral lines of some metals, with high chromospheric activity causing brightness changes as the star rotates. Its brightness varies by 0.04 magnitudes with a period of 2.61 days. It is also an Ap star, a type of chemically peculiar star with enhanced lines of many metals. The spectral class has been given as A2IVpSiSrCr, noting the particular strength of lines of silicon, strontium, and chromium, although other lines such as europium, mercury, and manganese are also stronger than in a normal star. This spectral type suggests that the star is an A2-class subgiant. One study from 2016 identified a low-mass companion to γ^{2} Arietis, a probable red dwarf in a close orbit.

The marginally fainter of the two visible stars, γ^{1} Arietis, is a Lambda Boötis (chemically peculiar) star with a stellar classification of A0Vnp and a magnitude of 4.64. Lambda Boötis stars are identified based on unusually low abundances of iron peak elements in their spectra. This star is spinning rapidly with a projected rotational velocity of 201 km/s, as suggested by the 'n' (nebulosity) notation. The spectral class of this component has also been given as A0IV-V(n)kB8, indicating that calcium K lines in its spectrum are more typical of a B8 star. Older studies often classified it as B9 or B9.5 with a luminosity class of IV or V, indicating either a main sequence or subgiant.

Both of the visible stars have mass of about 2.7 M_{☉}, luminosities of about 40 L_{☉}, effective temperatures of about 10,000 K, and radii of about 2 R_{☉}. Their age is about 34 million years.

== Nomenclature ==
γ Arietis (Latinised to Gamma Arietis) is the system's Bayer designation; γ^{1} and γ^{2} Arietis those of its two components. The designation of the two components as Gamma Arietis A and B derive from the convention used by the Washington Multiplicity Catalog (WMC) for multiple star systems, and adopted by the International Astronomical Union (IAU).

Gamma Arietis has been called "the First Star in Aries" as having been at one time the nearest visible star to the equinoctial point.

It bore the traditional name Mesarthim. Originally it had shared the name Sheratan with Beta Arietis. However, this got corrupted to "Sartai" in medieval manuscripts, which Bayer erroneously explained as being the Hebrew grammatical term מְשָׁרְתִים mᵉshārᵉthīm "servants", and later scholars picked up on this term.

In 2016, the IAU organized a Working Group on Star Names (WGSN) to catalogue and standardize proper names for stars. The WGSN decided to attribute proper names to individual stars rather than entire multiple systems. It approved the name Mesarthim for the component γ^{2} Arietis on 21 August 2016 and it is now so entered in the IAU Catalog of Star Names.

In Chinese, 婁宿 (Lóusù), meaning Bond (asterism), refers to an asterism consisting of Gamma, Beta and Alpha Arietis. Consequently, the Chinese name for Gamma Arietis itself is 婁宿二 (Lóusù Èr, English: the Second Star of Bond).

In Hindu astrology, Gamma Arietis and Beta Arietis (Sheratan) are Ashvins, the twin Rigvedic deities who act as doctors of the divine of the world.
