= Thiruthuraipoondi =

Thiruthuraipoondi Tirutturaippundi
- Town
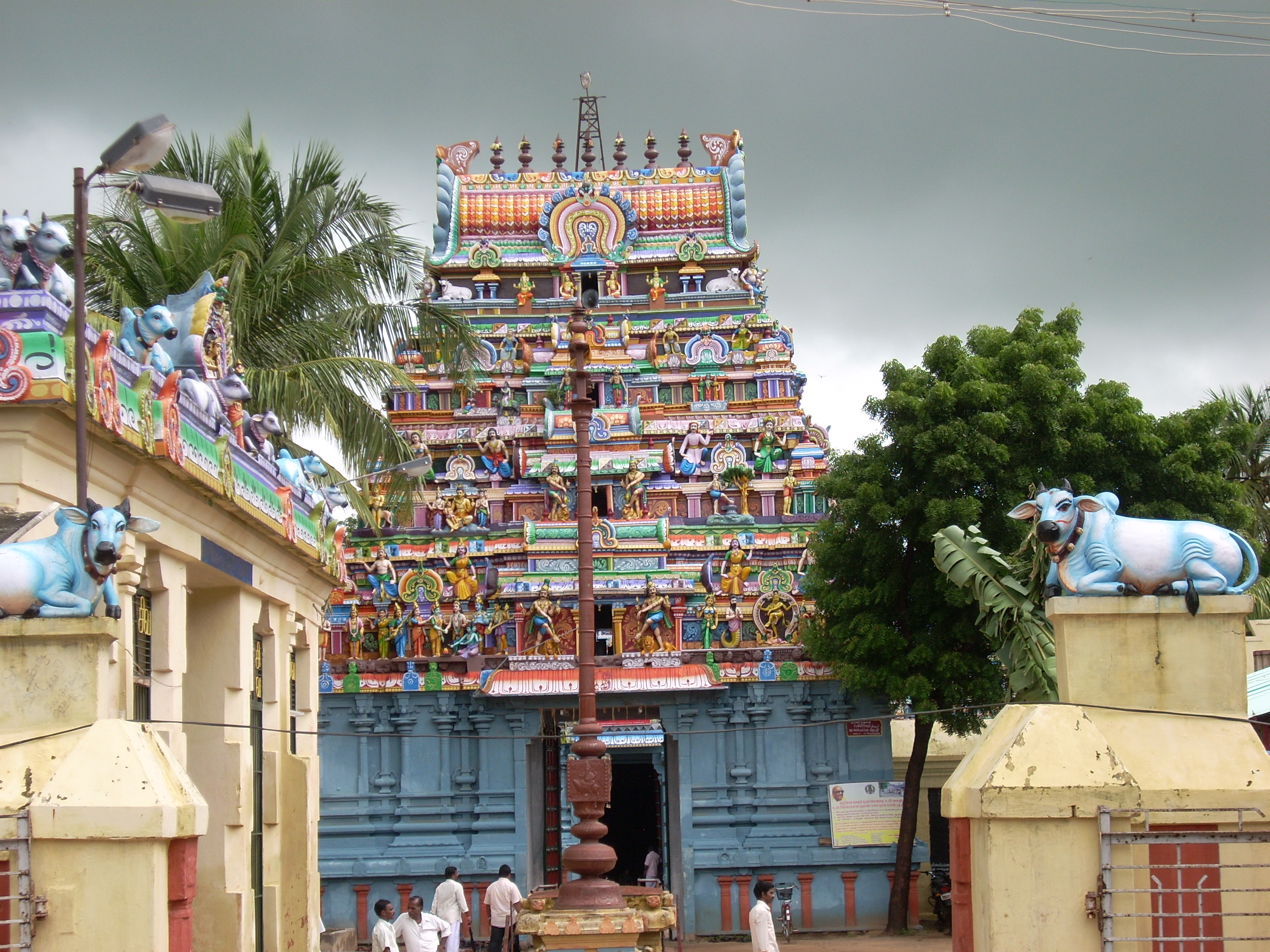
- Piravi Marundeeswarar Temple
- Nickname: TTP
- Location in Tamil Nadu, India
- Coordinates: 10.53°N 79.65°E
- Country: India
- State: Tamil Nadu
- District: Tiruvarur
- Taluk: Thiruthuraipoondi
- Zone: Cauvery Delta
- Region: Chola Nadu

Government
  - Type: Municipality
  - Body: Thiruthuraipoondi Municipality
  - Commissioner: S. Nagarajan

Area
  - Total: 11.94 km^{2} (4.61 sq mi)
- Elevation: 4 m (13 ft)

Population (2011)
  - Total: 24,404
  - Rank: 5
  - Density: 2,044/km^{2} (5,294/sq mi)

Languages
  - Official: Tamil
- Time zone: UTC+5:30 (IST)
- PIN: 614713
- Telephone code: 04369
- Vehicle registration: TN 50R
- Literacy: 88.63%
- Lok Sabha constituency: Nagapattinam
- Vidhan Sabha constituency: Thiruthuraipoondi
- Avg. annual temperature: 28.3 °C (82.9 °F)
- Avg. annual rainfall: 930.11 millimetres (36.619 in)
- Website: thiruthuraipoondi.net

Thiruthuraipoondi is a town in Tiruvarur district in the Indian state of Tamil Nadu. Thiruthuraipoondi is an agricultural town located south of Thiruvarur district. The town is located at a distance of 28 km (17 mi) from the district headquarters Thiruvarur.

Tirutturaipundi is a taluk in Tanjore District (Madras Presidency), after independence, it was a part of Thanjavur district till 1991. It subsequently became a part of the newly formed Tiruvarur district on 1 January 1997.

The Mulli river passes through the town. It is 1,260 square kilometres (490 sq mi) and includes more than 25 villages. Most of the people work in agriculture.

Thiruthuraipoondi is 330 km (210 mi) south of Chennai, 30 km (19 mi) East of Mannargudi and 30 km (19 mi) South of Thiruvarur. As of 2011, the town had a population of 24,404.

== History ==
The town was ruled by various dynasties including the Early Cholas, Kalabhras, Pallavas, Medieval Cholas, Later Cholas; and later by Pandyas, Vijayanagara Empire, Delhi Sultanate, Thanjavur Nayaks, Thanjavur Marathas and the British Empire.

== Geography ==
Thiruthuraipoondi or Thiruthuraipundi (a.k.a. TTP) is an agricultural town located south of District Thiruvarur.

Satellite pictures and carbon dating of some ancient beaches between Thiruthuraipoondi and Kodiyakarai show the Thiruthuraipoondi beach dates back 6,000 years and the Kodiyakarai beach 1,100 years. In other words, the sea was near Thiruthuraipoondi 6,000 years ago and reached Kodiyakarai around 1,100 years ago.

Tiruturaipundi is located at 10.53°N 79.65°E. It has an average elevation of 4 m (13 ft). Thiruthuraipoondi is located at center of many towns like Mannargudi, Thiruvarur, Muthupet, Vedaranyam, Velankanni, Kilvelur. Thiruthuraipoondi is located at Thiruvarur district.

== Economy ==
Agriculture is the main occupation for people living in Thiruthuraipoondi and surrounding areas. Rice and dhal items grow here. The short-term Kuruvai and long-term Samba rice crops are cultivated depending on the water sources. Thiruthuraipoondi Cooperative Urban Bank was established in 1911, and is the oldest bank in the city . Several major banks have branches in Thiruthuraipoondi.

=== Market ===
Thiruthuraipoondi Municipal Market is one of the important commercial centre, which supports the daily needs of population residing in and the surrounding rural areas & the town. The Municipality market is located in the central area accommodates 45 shops. The commercial activities are concentrated along TVR Road, Mannai salai, R.S. Road, D.M.C. Road, Bazar Street. Thiruthuraipoondi Municipal Market is one of the important commercial centres and generates revenue . At present, Municipal market is located in the central area near old bus stand area. The existing market needs to be retrofitted with additional facilities. Thiruthuraipoondi Municipality maintained one Fish market at Chetty street, Thiruthuraipoondi.

== Demographics ==
Religious census
Religion	Percent(%)
Hindu	90.41%
Muslim	6.36%
Christian	3.09%
Sikh	0.04%
Other	0.09%
No religion	0.01%

According to 2011 census, Thiruthuraipoondi had a population of 24,404 with a sex-ratio of 1,036 females for every 1,000 males, much above the national average of 929. A total of 2,324 were under the age of six, constituting 1,180 males and 1,144 females. Scheduled Castes and Scheduled Tribes accounted for 29.7% and 1.84% of the population respectively. The average literacy of the town was 80.19%, compared to the national average of 72.99%. The town had a total of : 6263 households. There were a total of 9,378 workers, comprising 607 cultivators, 885 main agricultural labourers, 92 in house hold industries, 4,833 other workers, 2,961 marginal workers, 57 marginal cultivators, 2,076 marginal agricultural labourers, 41 marginal workers in household industries and 787 other marginal workers. As per the religious census of 2011, Thiruthuraipoondi had 90.41% Hindus, 6.36% Muslims, 3.09% Christians, 0.04% Sikhs, 0.09% following other religions and 0.01% following no religion or did not indicate any religious preference.

== Culture ==
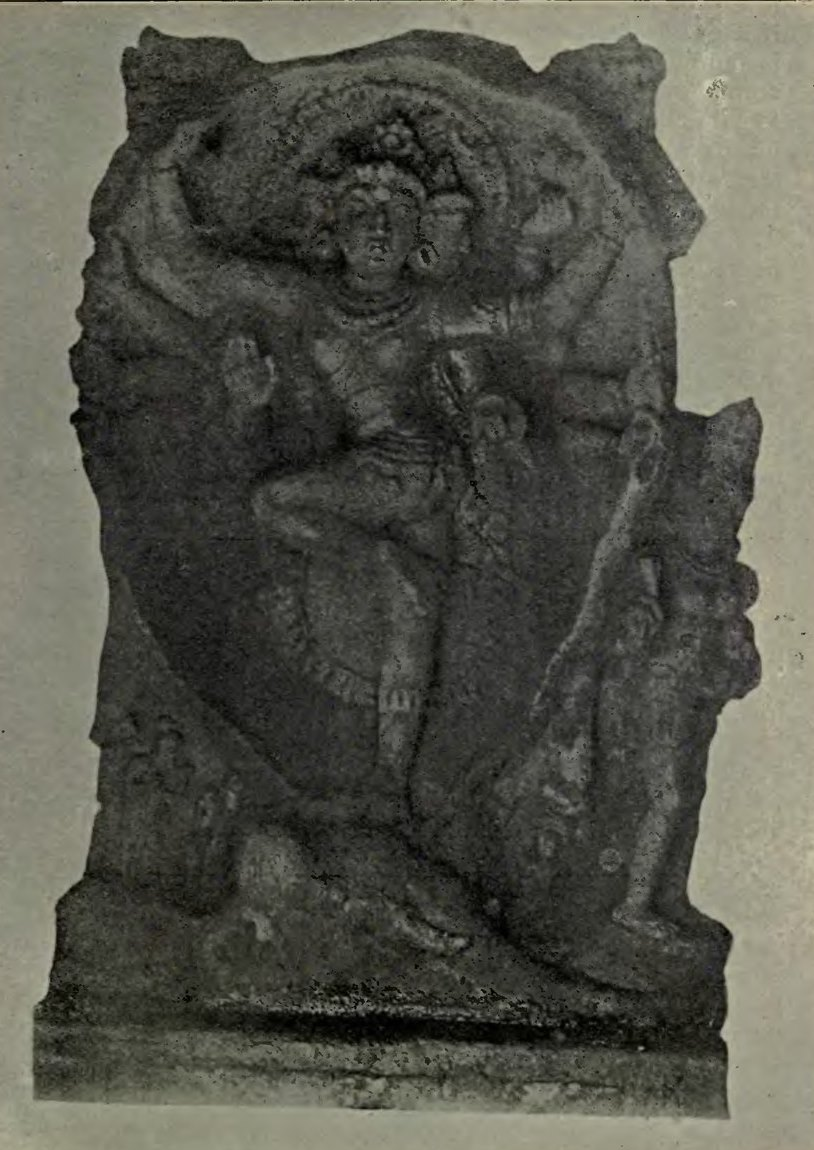
Gajasamharamurti panel, Tirutturaippundi

Thiruthuraipoondi has many Hindu temples, prominent one being the Chola-era, Bhava Oushadeeswara or Piravi Marundeeswarar Temple dedicated to Lord Shiva. Lord is worshipped as Gajasamharamurti.

=== Idol theft ===
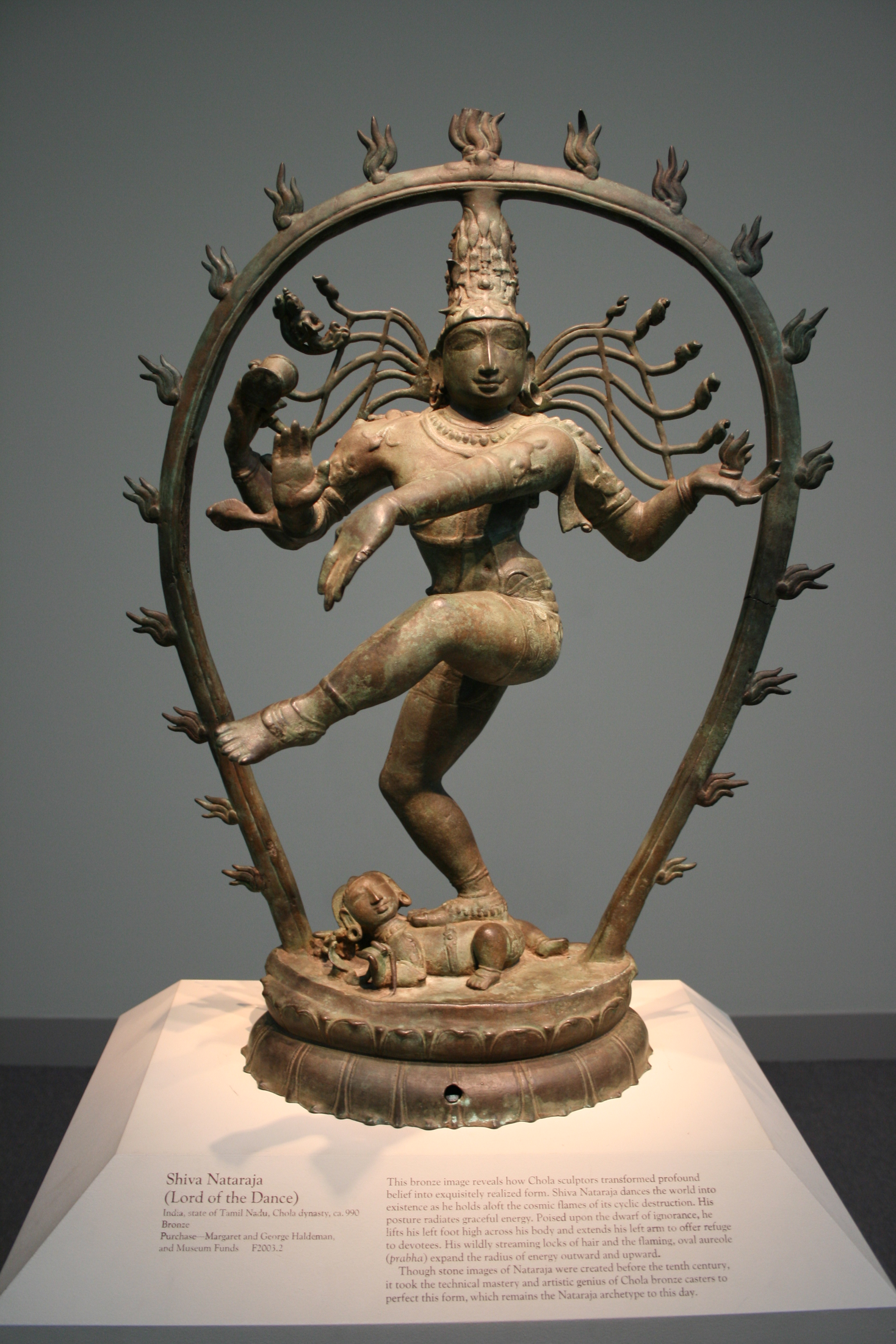
Nataraja (Freer Gallery)

The idol of Nataraja belonging to the temple is believed to have been stolen and smuggled abroad sometime after 1957, when it was last seen during a record-keeping exercise by the French Institute of Pondicherry. The Idol Wing of the Tamil Nadu Criminal Investigation Department (IW-CID) has traced it to the Freer Gallery of Art in the United States.

== Politics ==
Since 1971, Tiruthuraipundi assembly constituency has been consistently voting for Communist Party of India. This is one of few constituents in Tamil Nadu, that is a bastion for communist parties in Tamil Nadu. G. shri Palaniswamy, of CPI, has won this constituent, four straight elections, from 1989 to 2001. He won this constituent in 1991, which made it one of handful of constituents, that was won by a party other than ADMK/Congress, that year.

Tiruthuraipundi comes under the Nagapattinam (Lok Sabha constituency). The current Member of Parliament from the constituency is M. Selvarasu from the CPI. From 1957, the Nagapattinam parliament seat was held by the Indian National Congress for 4 times during 1957–1961, 1962–67, 1991–96, and 1996–98 elections. CPI won the seat for 5 times during 1971–77, 1977–80, 1989–91 elections. DMK won 4 times during 1980–84, 1999–2004, 2004–09 and 2011 elections. ADMK won the seat once during 1984–89.

== Municipality ==
Thiruthuraipoondi is a Municipality in district of Thiruvarur, Tamil Nadu and Thiruthuraipoondi is the headquarters of Thiruthuraipoondi taluk, Thiruthuraipondi Municipality was upgraded from selection grade Town Panchayat to Third grade Municipality 1992 and upgraded as Second Grade Municipality in 1996.As of 2011, the municipality covered an area of 11.94 km^{2} (4.61 sq mi) and had a population of 120,336. Thiruthuraipoondi comes under the Thiruthuraipoondi assembly constituency which elects a member to the Tamil Nadu Legislative Assembly once every five years and it is a part of the Nagapattinam constituency which elects its member of Parliament (MP) once in five years. The Thiruthuraipoondi Municipality is divided into 24 wards for which elections are held every 5 years. The Thiruthuraipoondi Municipality has population of 24,404 of which 11,985 are males while 12,419 are females as per report released by Census India 2011

The functions of the municipality are devolved into six departments: general administration/personnel, engineering, revenue, health, town planning and information technology (IT). All these departments are under the control of a municipal commissioner.

Roadways and railways are the major mode of transportation to the town. The nearest seaport, Nagapattinam Port, is located 43 km (27 mi) from Thiruthuraipoondi, while the nearest airport, Tiruchirappalli International Airport, is located 124 km (77 mi) from the town.

== Utility services ==
=== Electricity ===
Electricity supply to Thiruthuraipoondi is regulated and distributed by the Tamil Nadu Electricity Board (TNEB). The town and its suburbs forms the Trichy Electricity Distribution Circle. Thiruthuraipoondi TNEB office located at Anna Nagar, Thruthuraipoondi and Thiruthuraipoondi Sub-power station located at Pallankoil, Tiruthuraipoondi

=== Water ===
water supply to the town was provided from Kollidam River at Thiruvaikavur. Water supply is provided by the municipality of Thiruthuraipoondi; there are 9 over Head Tanks with a capacity of 17.15 lakhs litres in municipality.

=== Solid waste ===
Solid waste is collected by Thiruthuraipoondi Municipality every day by door-to-door collection. Subsequently, the source segregation and dumping is carried out by the sanitary department of the municipality.the Compost Yard(4.50 Acres) is located at Vedhai road.

=== Medical and emergency ===
There are two government hospitals, One maternity centre and ten private hospitals and private clinics in Thiruthuraipoondi and municipal health care centre at Ramamada street.

=== Law and order ===
Town Police Station of Thiruthuraipoondi, located at Mannargudi Road. All Women Police Station of Thiruthuraipoondi, located at Mannargudi Road. Deputy Superintendent of Police Camp Office, located at opposite of Police Station. Combined District Municipal Court Building located at D.M.C road.

== Paddy festival ==
Nel Thiruvizha or Paddy Festival is one of the biggest seed exchange programmes in the whole country, organised every year by the Save our Rice Campaign and the local host organisation – CREATE – at Thiruthuraipoondi. It was Nel Jayaraman who initiated this festival in 2007, when he, as the state coordinator of the campaign, had collected 15 indigenous seeds along with his mentor and guru Dr Nammalvar. In 12 years, he and his followers, enthusiastic organic farmers and seed savers, have collected about 174 varieties, most of them on the verge of extinction, from various regions in Tamil Nadu.

== Transport ==
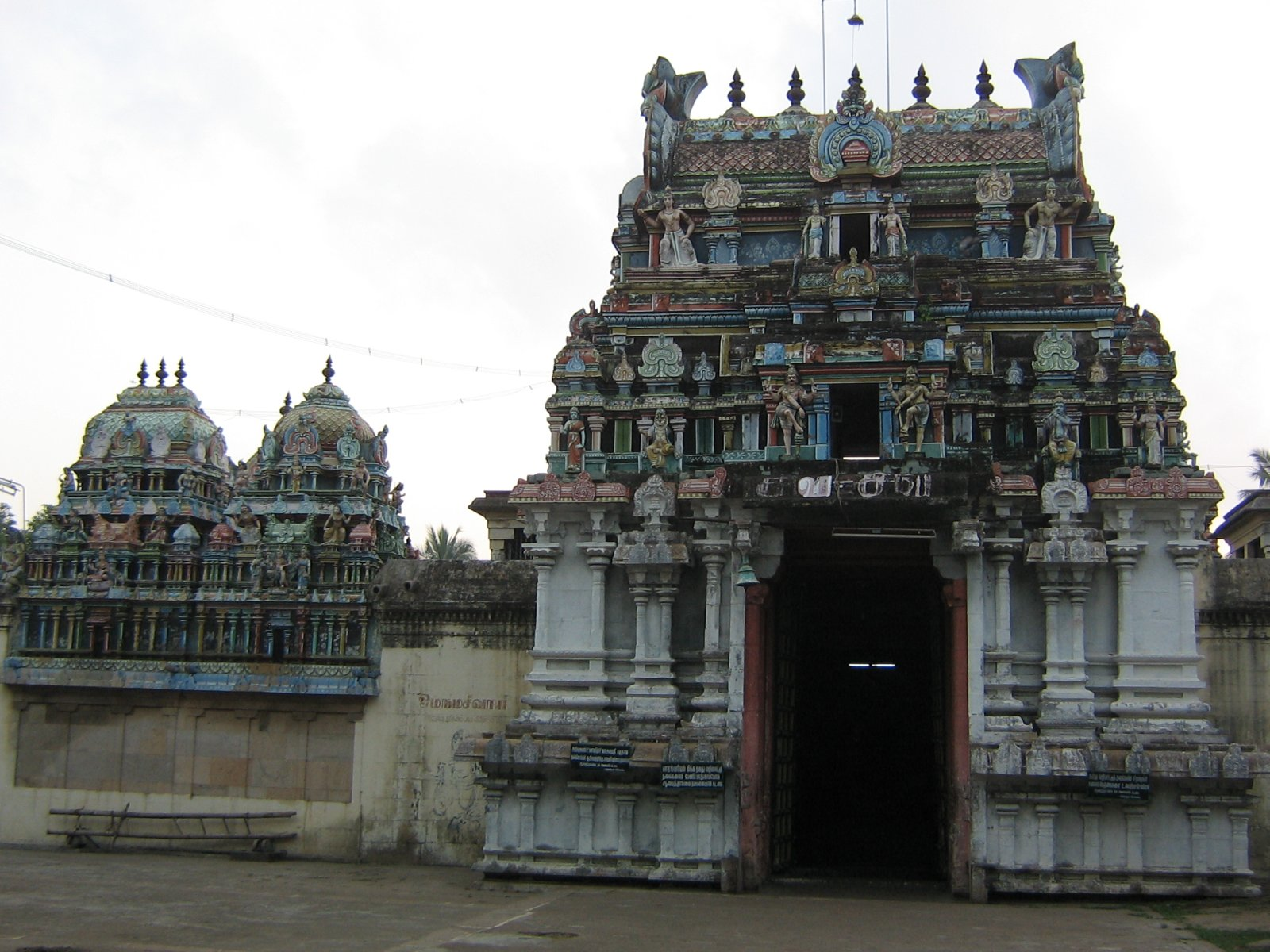
Piravimarundeesar Temple at Thiruthuraipoondi

Thiruthuraipoondi is well connected by road and rail with neighbouring towns.

=== Road ===
NH-32 (ECR) connecting Chennai–Nagapattinam–Velankanni–Thiruthuraipoondi–Muthupet–Ramanathapuram–Thoothukudi–Kanyakumari, SH-23 Thiruthuraipoondi to Mayiladuthurai via Thiruvarur, SH-63 connecting Thanjavur-Mannargudi–Vedharanyam and Kodiyakarai.

Buses are available to lot of major towns like Thiruvarur, Mannargudi, Muthupet, Pattukkottai, Velankanni, Nagapattinam, Vedharanyam, Kilvelur, Kodiyakarai, Kumbakonam, Mayiladuthurai, Thanjavur, Trichy. Also good number of buses plying to long-distance places like Coimbatore, Chennai, Madurai, Karur, Namakkal, Salem, Tirupur, Palani, Dindigul, Puducherry, Chidambaram, Kanchipuram, Viluppuram, Thiruchendur, Thoothukudi, Ramanathapuram, Ervadi, Sivagangai, Karaikudi, Thisayanvilai, Rameswaram, Mudukulathur, Sayalgudi and Bengaluru, Kulasekarapattinam, Tirunelveli Nagercoil Trivandrum as well. TNSTC Ticket reservation counter in New busstand, State Express Transport Corporation (Tamil Nadu) (SETC) and several private bus operators ply to cities like Chennai, Puthucherry, Salem, Hosur, Bengaluru, Coimbatore, Ramanathapuram, Thoothukudi, Tirunelveli, Nagercoil, Soon SETC and TNSTC planned to operate services to Tirupathi, Vellore, Erode and Coimbatore.

=== Rail ===
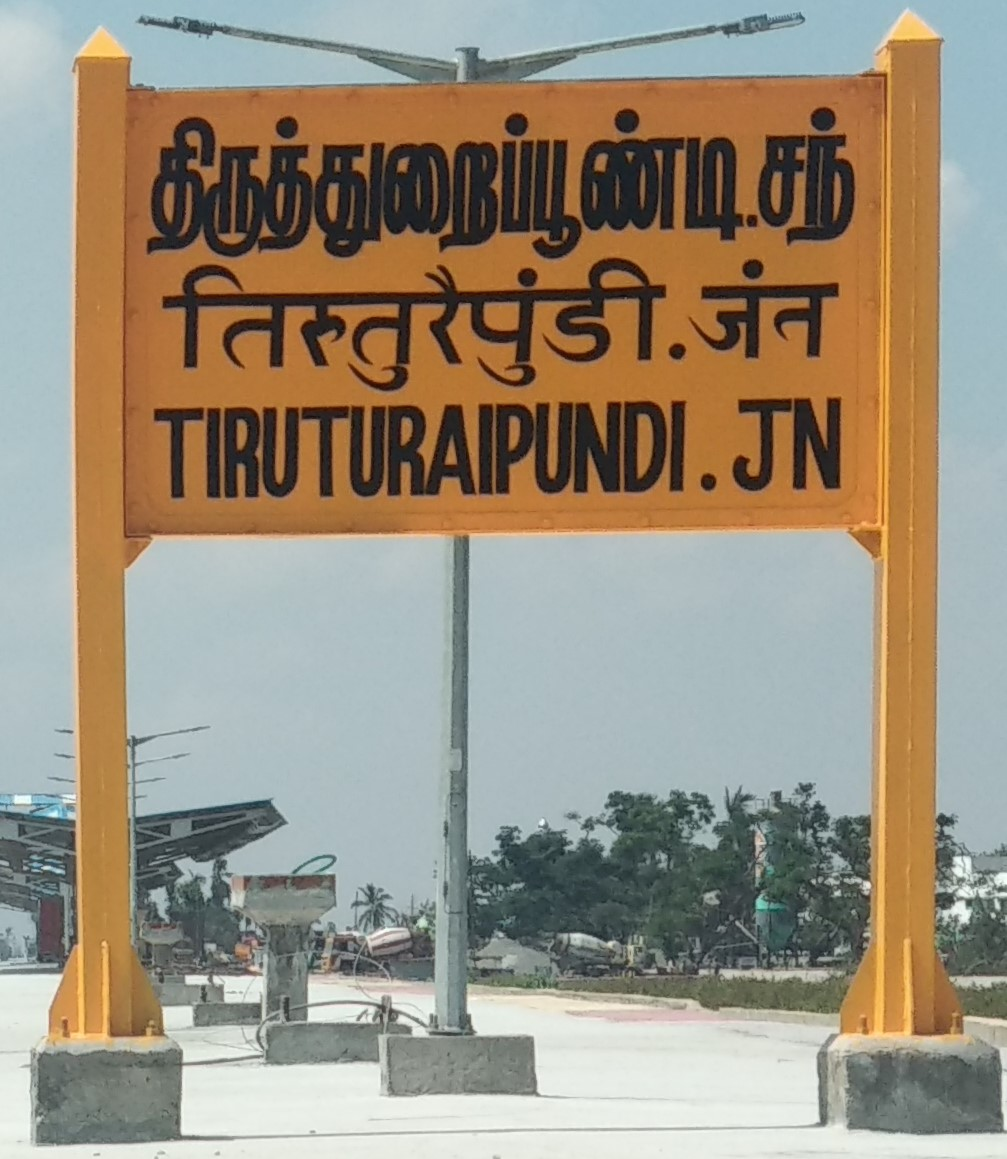
Tiruturaipundi Junction railway station

Tiruturaipundi Junction railway station serving the town of Thiruthuraipoondi, Train service between Thiruvarur Junction and Karaikkudi Junction via Thiruthuraipoondi route and Tiruturaipundi Junction to Vedharanyam, Agasthiyampalli railway station, and the New railway line works between Nagapattinam Junction–Velankanni–Thirukuvalai–Tiruturaipundi Junction.

== Education ==
There are four government high schools out of a total of 12 schools in the town. The Government Higher Secondary School (formerly Board High School), founded by the British government in 1936.This is one of the largest and oldest government school in Thiruvarur district, the Bharathidasan University Model College located at Velur, Thiruthuraipoondi, one teacher training institute at Paruthichery, Thiruthuraipoondi, one Industrial training institutes (ITI) and polytechnic college at Korukkai, Thiruthuraipoondi.

== Villages ==
- Keelaperumalai
