= Enkan Adhinarayana Perumal Temple =

Hindu temple in Tiruvarur district, Tamil Nadu, India

- Adhinarayana Perumal Temple, Engan, Tiruvarur, Tamil Nadu

Religion
- Affiliation: Hinduism
- District: Tiruvarur
- Deity: Adhinarayana Perumal
- Festivals: Vaikuntha Ekadashi, Gokulashtami, Garuda Panchami, Rama Navami

Location
- Location: Engan
- State: Tamil Nadu
- Country: India
- Interactive map of Enkan Adhinarayana Perumal Temple
- Coordinates: 10.813271°N 79.542385°E

Architecture
- Type: Dravidian architecture

Specifications
- Temple: One
- Elevation: 38.41 m (126 ft)

Adhinarayana Perumal Temple is a Perumal temple situated at Engan neighbourhood in Tiruvarur district of Tamil Nadu state in India.

== Location ==
This temple is located with the coordinates of (10.813271°N 79.542385°E) in Tiruvarur district.

== Significance ==
Vishnu appeared here in this temple sitting on a Garuda to give darshan to a Chollha king and hence thereafter He posed as such in this temple for the devotees also.

== Mythical importance ==
It was a myth that long long ago, Sage Bruhu was in deep meditation. Suddenly, the tranquility was shattered with loud noises of a Chollha king who was hunting a lion. Disturbed by this, the sage cursed the king to bear a lion's face. Regretting the intrusion, the king sought for a remedy. The sage advised him to take bath in the river Vettraru (also known as Vruddha Cauvery) and to pray Vishnu at this place for his goodness. The king did so and it worked to regain his human features. After that this place got importance.

== Festivals ==
Vaikuntha Ekadashi and Gokulashtami, Garuda Panchami, Rama Navami are the important festivals celebrated in this temple.
