= Akasapureeswarar Temple =

Shiva temple in Thanjavur district, Tamil Nadu, India

- Akasapureeswarar Temple, Kaduveli, Thanjavur district, Tamil Nadu

Religion
- Affiliation: Hinduism
- District: Thanjavur
- Deity: Akasapureeswarar
- Festivals: Maha Shivaratri, Navaratri, Annabhisekam, Panguni Uthiram, Thaipusam

Location
- Location: Kaduveli
- State: Tamil Nadu
- Country: India
- Interactive map of Akasapureeswarar Temple
- Coordinates: 10.880073°N 79.067284°E

Architecture
- Type: Dravidian architecture
- Creator: Chollha king
- Completed: 2,000 years ago

Specifications
- Temple: One
- Elevation: 69.62 m (228 ft)

Akasapureeswarar Temple is a Shiva temple at Kaduveli in Thanjavur district of Tamil Nadu state in India. The main deity in this temple is Akasapureeswarar and the goddess is Mangalambiga.

== Location ==
This temple is located with the coordinates of (10.880073°N 79.067284°E) near Thiruvaiyaru.

Akasapureeswarar Temple (Tamil Nadu)

== Significance ==
This place where the temple is built, was the birthplace of a Siddhar viz., Kaduveli Siddhar. The temple was constructed 2,000 years ago by a Chollha king and he named this temple after the name of the above-mentioned Siddhar.

== Festivals ==
Maha Shivaratri, Navaratri, Annabhisekam, Panguni Uthiram and Thaipusam are the important festivals celebrated in this temple.
