= Amritvarshini (raga) =

- Thaat: Kalyan
- Arohana: S G M P N Ṡ
- Avarohana: Ṡ N P M G S
- Vadi: P
- Samavadi: S

Amritvarshini is a Hindustani classical raga. It is performed between 7 and 10 p.m.

== Theory ==
The raga contains five notes each in Arohana and Avarohana; Sa Shuddha Ga and Shuddha Ni; TeevraMadhyama and Pa. It is classified as an Audava/Audava pentatonic raga.

=== Arohana and Avarohana ===
Aroha (Ascent): S G M P N Ṡ

Avaroha (Descent): Ṡ N P M G S

=== Vadi and Samavadi ===
Vadi: P

Samvadi: S

=== Pakad or Chalan ===
Pakad: SGmPNmPmG, mG->S

Chalan: SGmG, mGS, GmPN, NPmG, GmPNPmG, mG->S;

GmPNS, PNSGmGS, NS NP, NmPmG, mG->S

=== Organisation and relationships ===
Thaat: Kalyan

The Raga is based on Carnatic Raga Amritavarshini which is considered a janya rāga of the 66th Melakartha Chitrambari, though it can be derived from other Melakarthas Kalyani, Gamanashrama or Vishwambari by dropping both Rishabh and Dhaivat.

=== Samay (Time) ===
Nomenclature: Nomenclature for Notation- ‘D ‘n ‘N ; S r R g G M m P d D n N; S’ r’ R’ /

P, RS – Halt between P and RS/Meenda (Glissando)- P->m /Kana swara (Grace note) RG

== Film Songs ==
- Thoongatha vizhigal rendu (Agninakshatram) (Tamil), Composer: Ilayaraja, Singers: KJ Yesudas, Janaki
- Vanin Devi Varuga (Oruvar vazhum Alayam) (Tamil), Composer: Ilayaraja, Singers: Spb, Janaki
- Malaikoru Devane (Sri Raghavendra) (Tamil), Composer: Ilayaraja, Singers: KJ Yesudas
- Unathu Kalai (Sasanam) (Tamil), Composer: Balabharathi, Singers: KS Chitra
- Kathiruntha malli (Mallu veeti minor) (Tamil), Composer: Ilayaraja, Singers: P Susheela
- Azhagiya Megangal (Ganga Gowri) (Tamil), Composer: MS Viswanathan, Singers: S. Janaki
- Sivagami Aada Vanthaal (Paattum Bharathum), Composer: MSV, Singer: P. Susheela, TMS
- Ippothenna Thevai (Makkal Aatchi), Composer: Ilayaraja, Singer: Lekha
