= Chandeshvara Nayanar =

Nayanar saint

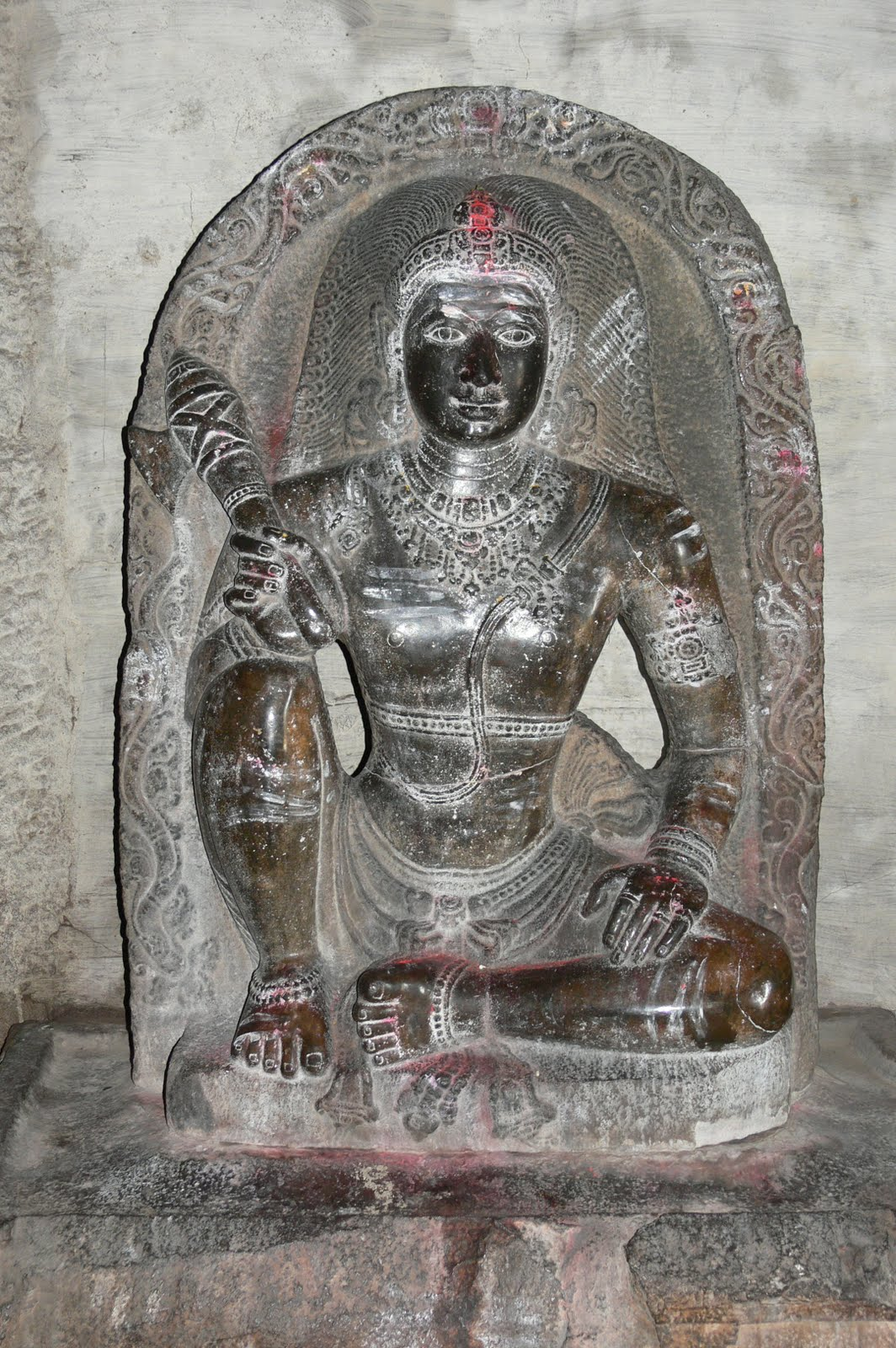
Chandeshvara

Chandesha or Canda or Chandikeshwara is one of the 63 Nayanars. Processional bronze images of him generally show him as a boy, with entwined locks of hair, standing with his hands in Añjali Mudrā and with an axe in the crook of his arm. In the Shaiva temples of South India, his shrine is positioned within the first enclosure wall of the temple complex and to the North East of the lingam. He is there typically shown seated, with one leg dangling downwards, a hand on one thigh and an axe clasped in the other. He faces inwards towards the main temple wall. He is depicted as deeply lost in meditation, and devotees snap their fingers or clap their hands to attract his attention. Another explanation, since he is considered to be the guardian of the temple belongings, is that devotees clap their hands to show that they are leaving the temple empty-handed. It is also customary to leave even the sacred ash inside the temple itself.

His original role was probably that of recipient of nirmālya, that is to say of offerings of food and garlands that had originally been offered to Shiva.

== Legend ==
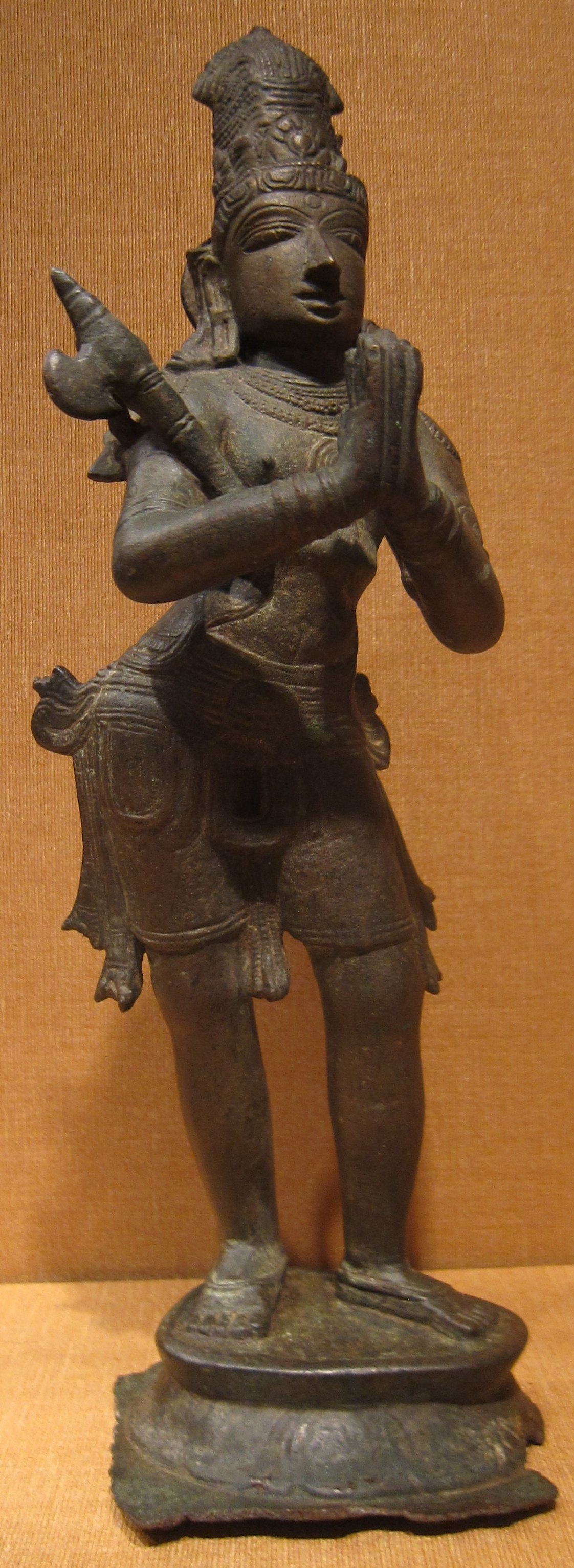
Chandeshvara, Tanjore

The South Indian legend, narrated, for instance, in the Periyapuranam, states that he was born into a Brahmin family and was called Visarasarman. When he was a young boy, he found that cows remain uncared for, and hence he himself commenced tendering and caring for the cows. While doing so, he would pour some milk on a lingam, which he made of sand. The news of this wastage of milk reached the ear of his father, Datta; and he himself came to the field to scold his son. Chandesha was deep in meditation in front of the sand lingam, and he did not see his father. The enraged father kicked the sand lingam. At this Chandesha’s meditation was interrupted, and he struck his father’s leg with a staff. The staff turned into an axe and his father’s leg was severed. At this point, Shiva manifested himself, and blessed Chandesha, declared that he would become a father to Chandesha; and restored the severed leg of Datta to normal state.

Shiva, pleased with the devotion of Chandesha also appointed him as the caretaker of his Wealth (caretaker of Ganas as per another version). While praying to Chandesha (or Chandikeshwara) in South Indian temples, devotees click their fingers or clap. This is to show to Chandikeshwara that their hands are empty and they are not taking away any wealth of Shiva. Since, Chandikeshwara is always in deep meditation, this clicking / clapping sound is also to awaken Him before confirming to Him that no wealth is being taken away.

In some Sanskrit works, however, Chandesha is instead said to be an incarnation of Shiva's anger. Chandesha is now often regarded as an exclusively South Indian figure, but he was once known in North India too, and probably also as far afield as Cambodia.

== Worship ==
All Shiva temples in South India have a separate shrine for Chandesa, usually located opposite to the shrine of Durga. He is usually sported in seated posture with his left leg folded and his right hand holding an axe. Chandesa also has an image among the image of 63 Nayanmars in large Shiva temples. A Chola bronze of Chandikeswara, dated from 11th century was found from Thiruvenkadu in Nagapattinam district. The image with a height of 66 cm (26 in) is sported with Chandesa in seated posture with his folded left leg. The figure is shown seated in Bhadra peetah. The right hand shows kataka posture indicating the presence of parasur. He wears Jatamakuta, with the design of honeycomb and seen wearing the sacred thread. The bronze image is stored in the Bronze Gallery in the Government Museum, Chennai.
