= Chandra =

Lunar deity in Hinduism

- God of the Moon, Night and Vegetation
- Member of Navagraha
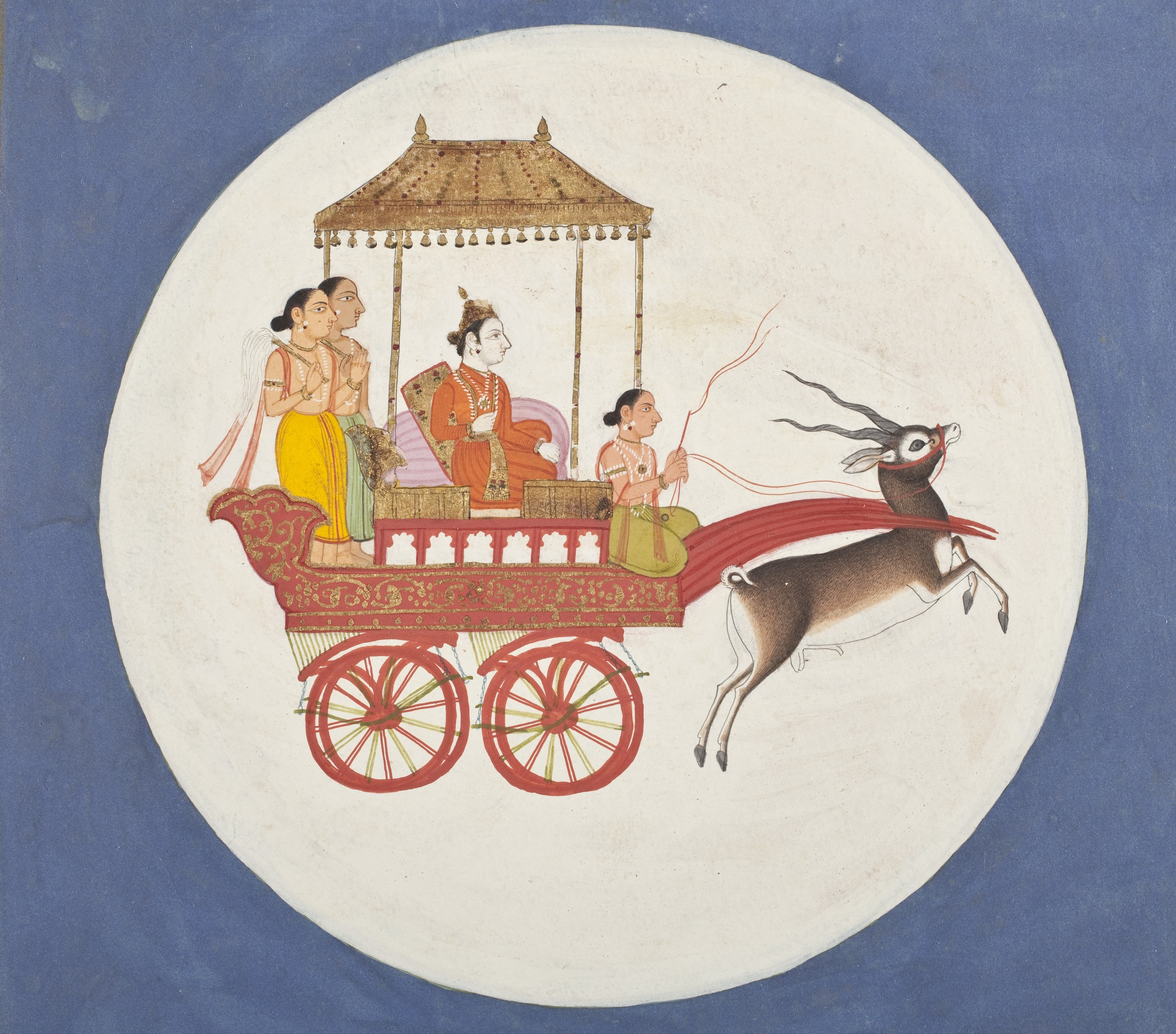
- A painting of Chandra from Mewar, Rajasthan, c. 18th century CE
- Other names: Soma, Chandrama, Shashank, Nishakara, Shashi, Mayank, Vidhu
- Devanagari: चंद्र
- Affiliation: Deva, Graha
- Abode: Chandraloka
- Planet: Moon
- Mantra: Om Chandramasē Namaha
- Weapon: Rope
- Day: Monday
- Color: Pale white
- Number: 2, 11, 20, 29
- Mount: Chariot pulled by an antelope
- Gender: Male

Genealogy
- Parents: Atri (father); Anasuya (mother)
- Siblings: Durvasa and Dattatreya
- Consort: Rohini (chief consort), and 26 other Nakshatra goddesses
- Children: Budha, Varchas, Bhadra, Jyotsnakali and other children

Equivalents
- Greek: Selene
- Roman: Luna

Chandra (Sanskrit: चन्द्र, romanized: Chandra, lit. 'shining' or 'moon'), also known as Soma (Sanskrit: सोम), is the Hindu god of the Moon, and is associated with the night, plants and vegetation. He is one of the Navagraha (nine planets of Hinduism).

== Etymology and other names ==
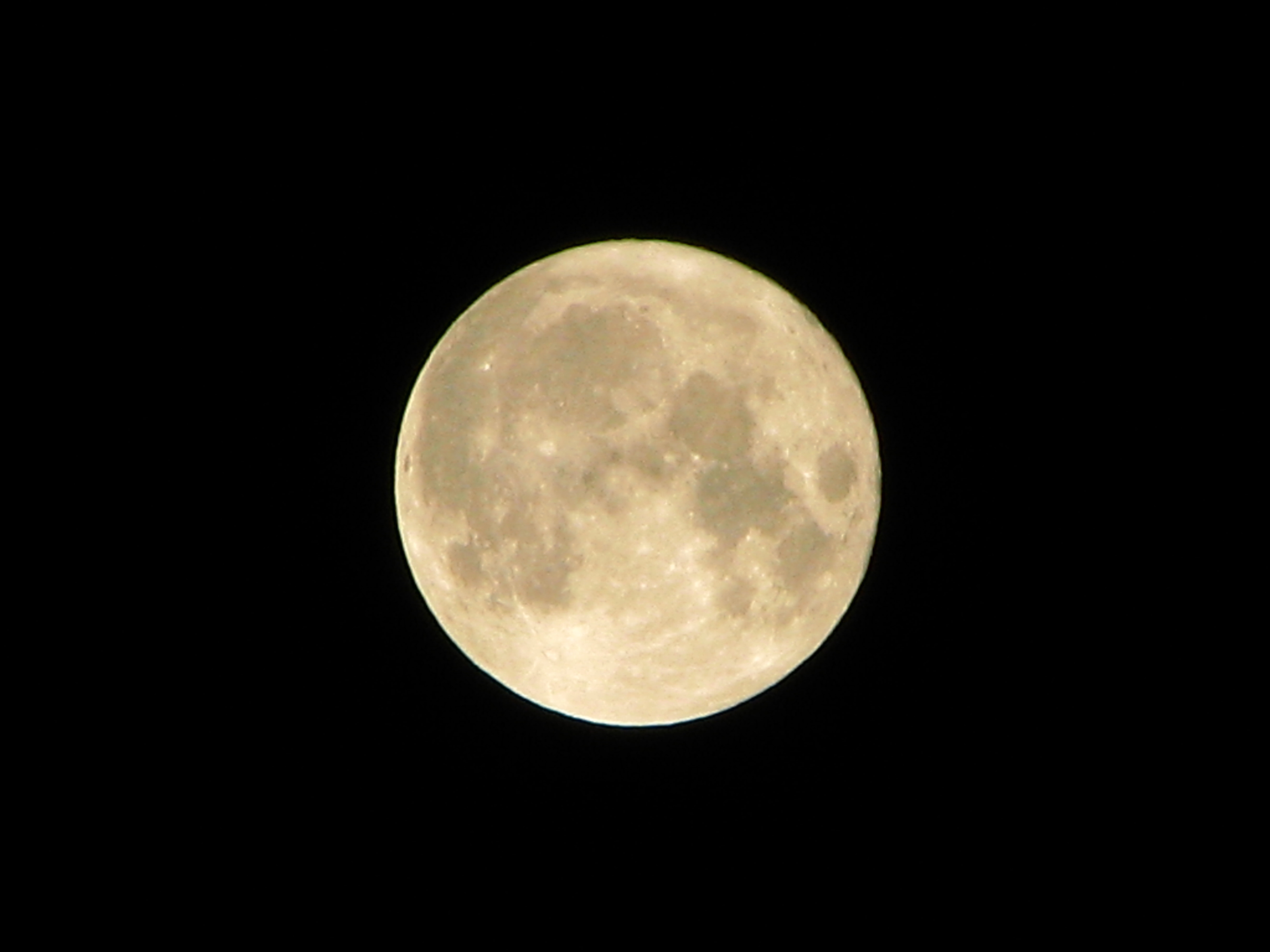
The scriptures compare the Moon to a white goose in the blue lake of sky.

The word "Chandra" literally means "bright, shining or glittering" and is used for the "Moon" in Sanskrit and other Indo-Aryan languages. It is also the name of various other figures in Hindu mythology, including an asura and a Suryavamsha king. It is also a common Indian name and surname. Both male and female name variations exist in many South Asian languages that originate from Sanskrit.

Some of the epithets of Chandra include Soma (distill), Indu (bright drop), Shashank (hare-marked), Atrisuta (son of Atri), Shashin or Shachin (the essence), Taradhipa (lord of stars), Nishakara (the night maker), Nakshatrapati (lord of the Nakshatra), Oshadhipati (lord of herbs), Uduraj or Udupati (water lord), Kumudanatha (lord of lotuses), and Udupa (boat).

=== Soma ===
Soma is one of the most common other names used for the deity; but the earliest use of the word to refer to the Moon is a subject of scholarly debate. Some scholars state that the word Soma is occasionally used for the Moon in the Vedas, while other scholars suggest that such usage emerged only in the post-Vedic literature.

In the Vedas, the word Soma is primarily used for an intoxicating and energizing/healing plant drink and the deity representing it. In post-Vedic Hindu mythology, Soma is used for Chandra, who is associated with the moon and the plant. The Hindu texts state that the Moon is lit and nourished by the Sun, and that it is Moon where the divine nectar of immortality resides. In Puranas, Soma is sometimes also used to refer to Vishnu, Shiva (as Somanatha), Yama and Kubera. In some Indian texts, Soma is the name of an apsara; alternatively it is the name of any medicinal concoction, or rice-water gruel, or heaven and sky, as well as the name of certain places of pilgrimage.

Inspired by his interest in Indian mysticism, Aldous Huxley took the name for the drug used by the state in his novel Brave New World to control the population after the Vedic ritual drink Soma.

== Legend ==
=== Vedas ===
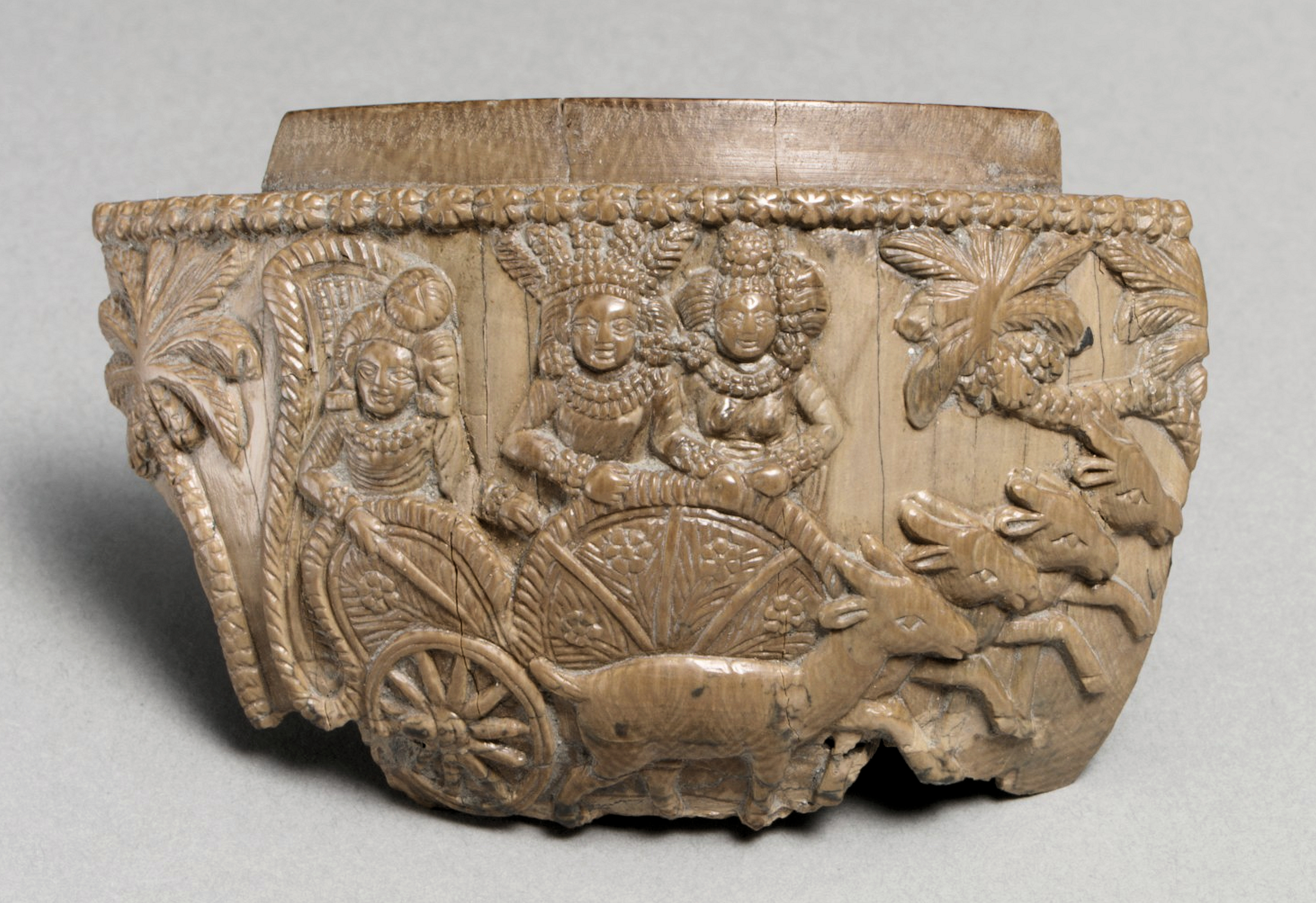
Possible depiction of the Moon God Chandra in his chariot with wife and attendant, 2nd-1st century BCE, Shunga period, West Bengal.

The origin of Soma is traced back to the Hindu Vedic texts, where he is the personification of a drink made from a plant with the same name. Scholars state that the plant had an important role in Vedic civilization and thus, the deity was one of the most important gods of the pantheon. In these Vedic texts, Soma is praised as the lord of plants and forests; the king of rivers and earth; and the father of the gods. The entire Mandala 9 of the Rigveda is dedicated to Soma, both the plant and the deity. The identification of Soma as a lunar deity in the Vedic texts is a controversial topic among scholars. According to William J. Wilkins, "In later years the name Soma was [...] given to the moon. How and why this change took place is not known; but in the later of the Vedic hymns there is some evidence of the transition. (Note: Wilkins states, "In the following passage Soma seems to be used in both senses—as god of the intoxicating juice, and as the moon ruling through the night. "By Soma the Adityas are strong; by Soma the earth is great; and Soma is placed in the midst of the stars. When they crush the plant, he who drinks regards it as Soma. Of him whom the priests regard as Soma (the moon) no one drinks." In another passage this prayer is found: "May the god Soma, he whom they call the Moon, free me.... Soma is the moon, the food of the gods. The sun has the nature of Agni, the moon of Soma.")

=== Epics and Puranas ===
In post Vedic texts like the Ramayana, the Mahabharata and the Puranas, Soma is mentioned as a lunar deity and has many epithets including Chandra. According to most of these texts, Chandra, along with his brothers Dattatreya and Durvasa, were the sons of the sage Atri and his wife Anasuya. The Devi Bhagavata Purana states Chandra to be the avatar of the creator god Brahma. Some texts contain varying accounts regarding Chandra's birth. According to one text, he is the son of Dharma; while another mention Prabhakar as his father. Many legends about Chandra are told in the scriptures.

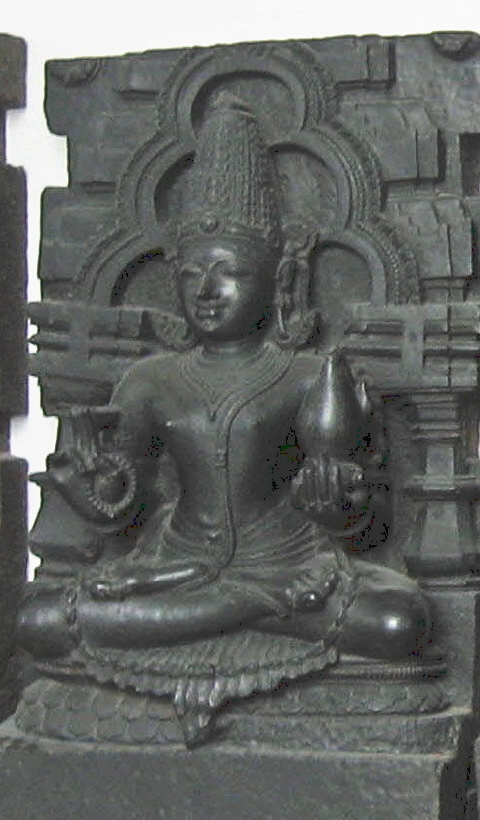
Chandra, British Museum, 13th century, Konark

One of the most prominent narratives involving Chandra centers on his illicit relationship with Tara, the wife of Brihaspati, the preceptor of the Devas. According to the story, Tara came to Chandra’s abode during her wanderings, and they fell in love with each other. Despite multiple attempts by Brihaspati to reclaim his wife, Tara remained with Chandra. Brihaspati’s disciples and even Brihaspati himself confronted Chandra, who argued that Tara had come of her own will and would leave when she desired. The situation escalated when Brihaspati sought the intervention of the Devas. Indra, the king of the Devas, threatened war to compel Chandra to return Tara. However, the Devas were divided in their opinions, and the Asuras, led by their preceptor Shukra, sided with Chandra. A fierce conflict ensued between the Devas and Asuras, resulting in cosmic turmoil. Eventually, Brahma, the creator, intervened to restore order. He admonished Chandra and Shukra, leading to the cessation of the battle. Chandra reluctantly returned Tara to Brihaspati. However, Tara was already pregnant, which gave rise to a dispute over the child's paternity. Brahma once again intervened, questioning Tara directly. She revealed that Chandra was the father. Consequently, Brahma ordered Brihaspati to hand over the child to Chandra. The child born from this union was named Budha, who later became an important deity associated with intellect and wisdom.

Chandra is traditionally married to the 27 daughters of the sage Daksha, who personify the 27 Nakshatras (lunar mansions). These daughters are named Ashvini, Bharani, Krittika, Rohini, Mrigashira, Ardra, Punarvasu, Pushya, Ashlesha, Magha, Purvaphalguni, Uttaraphalguni, Hasta, Chitra, Swati, Vishakha, Anuradha, Jyeshtha, Mula, Purvashadha, Uttara Ashadha, Shravana, Dhanishta, Shatabhisha, Purvabhadra, Uttarabhadra, and Revati. Chandra's movement through these Nakshatras reflects the lunar cycle and influences various astrological and ritual practices. Despite being married to all 27, Chandra showed special affection for Rohini, causing jealousy among his other wives. The preferential treatment of Rohini led the other wives to complain to their father, Daksha. Despite repeated warnings from Daksha, Chandra continued to favor Rohini. In anger, Daksha cursed Chandra to suffer from Kshayaroga (consumption or tuberculosis). This affliction impacted not just Chandra but also affected the medicinal plants and other living beings dependent on lunar influence. The Devas intervened, and after much pleading, Daksha modified his curse, allowing Chandra to be free from the disease for half of every month by bathing in the Sarasvati Tirtha. This mythological explanation accounts for the waxing and waning of the moon, with Chandra's periodic immersion in the sacred waters symbolizing his gradual recovery and decline (Mahabharata, Shalya Parva, Chapter 35).

In the mythological narrative of the Samudra Manthan (Churning of the Ocean), the Devas and Asuras sought the Amrita (nectar of immortality). A demon named Rahu disguised himself as a Brahmin and attempted to drink the nectar. Surya (the Sun) and Chandra recognized the deception and alerted Vishnu, who severed Rahu's head with his Sudarshana Chakra. However, because Rahu had consumed the nectar, his head and body became immortal, forming the entities Rahu and Ketu. Rahu and Ketu, bearing enmity toward Surya and Chandra for revealing their deception, periodically "swallow" the moon and the sun, leading to solar and lunar eclipses. This myth provides a symbolic representation of eclipses as moments of cosmic tension and conflict. During the reign of Emperor Prithu, Bhumidevi (Earth) was transformed into a cow to provide nourishment to all beings. When the sages milked Bhumidevi, Chandra served as the calf, an act which pleased Brahma. In recognition, Brahma crowned Chandra as the king of stars and medicines. This role signifies Chandra's influence over medicinal plants and the healing arts, linking his cycles to the growth and potency of herbs.

Chandra is one of the Ashta-vasus, a group of eight elemental deities. He had four sons—Varchas, Shishira, Prana, and Ramana—with his wife Manohara. Notably, his son Varchas was later reborn as Abhimanyu, the heroic son of Arjuna in the Mahabharata.

According to another legend, Ganesha was returning home on his mount Krauncha (a shrew) late on a full moon night after a mighty feast given by Kubera. On the journey back, a snake crossed their path and frightened by it, his mount ran away dislodging Ganesha in the process. An overstuffed Ganesha fell to the ground on his stomach, vomiting out all the Modaks he had eaten. On observing this, Chandra laughed at Ganesha. Ganesha lost his temper and broke off one of his tusks and flung it straight at the Moon, hurting him, and cursed him so that he would never be whole again. Therefore, It is forbidden to behold Chandra on Ganesh Chaturthi. This legend accounts for the Moon's waxing and waning including a big crater on the Moon, a dark spot, visible even from Earth.

Chandra holds a crucial place in Hindu astrology (Jyotisha) and is associated with the mind, emotions, and fertility. His phases are believed to influence human behavior, agriculture, and the timing of rituals. As the luminary of the night, Chandra embodies the reflective and nurturing aspects of the cosmos, balancing the solar energies represented by Surya.

== Iconography ==
Soma's iconography varies in Hindu texts. The most common is one where he is a white-coloured deity, holding a mace in his hand, riding a chariot with three wheels and three or more white horses (up to ten).

Soma as the Moon-deity is also found in Buddhism, and Jainism.

== Zodiac and calendar ==
Soma is the root of the word Somavara or Monday in the Hindu calendar. The word "Monday" in the Greco-Roman and other Indo-European calendars is also dedicated to the Moon. Soma is part of the Navagraha in the Hindu zodiac system. The role and importance of the Navagraha developed over time with various influences. Deifying the moon and its astrological significance occurred as early as the Vedic period and was recorded in the Vedas. The earliest work of astrology recorded in India is the Vedanga Jyotisha which began to be compiled in the 14th century BCE. The moon and various classical planets were referenced in the Atharvaveda around 1000 BCE.

The Navagraha was furthered by additional contributions from Western Asia, including Zoroastrian and Hellenistic influences. The Yavanajataka, or 'Science of the Yavanas', was written by the Indo-Greek named "Yavanesvara" ("Lord of the Greeks") under the rule of the Western Kshatrapa king Rudrakarman I. The Navagraha would further develop and culminate in the Shaka era with the Saka, or Scythian, people. Additionally the contributions by the Saka people would be the basis of the Indian national calendar, which is also called the Saka calendar.

The Hindu calendar is a lunisolar calendar which records both lunar and solar cycles. Like the Navagraha, it was developed with the successive contributions of various works.

== Astronomy ==
Soma was presumed to be a planet in Hindu astronomical texts. It is often discussed in various Sanskrit astronomical texts, such as the 5th century Aryabhatiya by Aryabhatta, the 6th century Romaka by Latadeva and Panca Siddhantika by Varahamihira, the 7th century Khandakhadyaka by Brahmagupta and the 8th century Sisyadhivrddida by Lalla. Other texts such as Surya Siddhanta dated to have been complete sometime between the 5th century and 10th century present their chapters on various planets with deity mythologies. However, they show that the Hindu scholars were aware of elliptical orbits, and the texts include sophisticated formulae to calculate its past and future positions:

The longitude of Moon = $m - \frac{P \times R \sin (m - a)}{360}$
– Surya Siddhanta II.39.43
where m is the Moon's mean longitude, a is the longitude at apogee, P is epicycle of apsis, R=3438'.

== Chandra temples ==
Besides worship in Navagraha temples, Chandra is also worshipped in the following temples (please help expand this partial list)

- Parimala Ranganatha Perumal temple: Vishnu temple with shrine for Chandra
- Kailasanathar Temple, Thingalur: Navagraha temple associated with Chandra; main deity being Shiva
- Chandramoulisvarar Temple, Arichandrapuram: Shiva temple with shrine for Chandra
- ThiruVaragunamangai Perumal Temple: Nava Tirupathi Vishnu temple associated with Chandra

== In popular culture ==
Chandra plays an important role in one of the first novel-length mystery stories in English, The Moonstone (1868).

The Sanskrit word Chandrayāna (Sanskrit: चन्द्रयान, Moon Vehicle) is used to refer to India's lunar orbiters.

== See also ==
- Ardha chandrasana, half-moon pose in yoga
- Navagraha
- Soma
- Somalamma
- List of lunar deities
- List of Hindu deities
- Agni
- Surya
- Lunar dynasty

== Bibliography ==
- Dalal, Roshen (2010a). Hinduism: An Alphabetical Guide. Penguin Books India. ISBN 978-0-14-341421-6.
- Monier-Williams, Monier (1872). A Sanskrit-English Dictionary. Clarendon. p. 315.
- Mani, Vettam (1975). Puranic Encyclopaedia: a Comprehensive Dictionary with Special Reference to the Epic and Puranic Literature. Motilal Banarsidass Publishers. ISBN 978-0-8426-0822-0.
- Edward Washburn Hopkins (1968). Epic Mythology. Biblo & Tannen Publishers. p. 90. ISBN 978-0-8196-0228-2.
- Stephanie Jamison (2015). The Rigveda –– Earliest Religious Poetry of India. Oxford University Press. ISBN 978-0190633394.
- Wilkins, William J. (1913). "Soma". Hindu Mythology – Vedic and Puranic. Thacker Spink London.
- Jones, Constance; Ryan, James D. (2006). Encyclopedia of Hinduism. Infobase Publishing. ISBN 978-0-8160-7564-5.
- Dowson, John (1870). A Classical Dictionary of Hindu Mythology and Religion, Geography, History, and Literature. Trübner & Company.
