= List of Nakshatras =

In Indian vedic astronomy, there are 27 nakshatras, or sectors along the ecliptic. A list of them is first found in the Vedanga Jyotisha, a text dated to the final centuries BCE. The nakshatra system predates the influence of Hellenistic astronomy on Vedic tradition, which became prevalent from about the 2nd century CE. There are various systems of enumerating the nakshatras; although there are 27–28 days to a sidereal month, by custom only 27 days are used. The following list gives the corresponding regions of sky. Months in the modern Indian national calendar, which is based on the traditional "nirayana" sidereal calendar, are named after twelve of the nakshatras, but do not coincide with the times when the sun is passing through these nakshatras - in fact, they are close to the opposite. It is possible that during the original naming of these months—whenever that happened—they were based on the position of the Full Moon (opposite the Sun). The modern Indian national calendar is a solar calendar, much like the Gregorian calendar, wherein solstices and equinoxes fall on the same date(s) every year.

Nakshatras
No.	Name	Associated stars	Description	Image
1	Ashvini -"physician to the Gods"	β "Sheratan" and γ "Mesarthim" Arietis	Lord: Ketu (South lunar node); Symbol : Horse's head; Deity : Ashvins, the horse-headed twins who are physicians to the gods; Indian zodiac: 0° – 13°20' Mesha; Western zodiac 23°46 Aries – 7°06' Taurus	
2	Bharani – "the bearer"	35, 39 "Lilii Borea", and 41 Arietis	Lord: Shukra (Venus); Symbol: Yoni, the female organ of reproduction; Deity: Yama, god of death or Dharma; Indian zodiac: 13° 20' – 26°40' Mesha; Western zodiac 7°06' – 20°26' Taurus	
3	Krittika – an old name of the Pleiades; personified as the nurses of Kārttikeya, a son of Shiva.	Pleiades	Lord: Surya (Sun); Symbol: Knife or spear; Deity : Agni, god of fire; Indian zodiac: 26°40' Mesha – 10° Vrishabha; Western zodiac 20°26' Taurus – 3°46’ Gemini	
4	Rohini – "the red one", a name of Aldebaran. Also known as brāhmī	Aldebaran	Lord: Chandra (Moon); Symbol: Cart or chariot, temple, banyan tree; Deity : Brahma or Prajapati, the Creator; Indian zodiac: 10° – 23°20' Vrishabha; Western zodiac 3°46 – 17°06' Gemini	
5	Mrigashira – "the deer's head". Also known as āgrahāyaṇī	λ "Meissa", φ Orionis	Lord: Mangala (Mars); Symbol: Deer's head; Deity: Soma, Chandra, the Moon god; Indian zodiac: 23° 20' Vrishabha – 6° 40' Mithuna; Western zodiac: 17°06' Gemini – 0°26' Cancer	
6	Ardra – "the storm god"	Betelgeuse	Lord: Rahu (North lunar node); Symbol: Teardrop, diamond, a human head; Deity : Rudra, the storm god; Indian zodiac: 6° 40' – 20° Mithuna; Western zodiac: 0°26' – 13°46 Cancer	
7	Punarvasu – "the two restorers of goods", also known as yamakau "the two chariots"	Castor and Pollux	Lord: Guru (Jupiter); Symbol : Bow and quiver; Deity : Aditi, mother of the gods; Indian zodiac: 20° Mithuna – 3°20' Karka; Western zodiac 13°46 – 27°06' Cancer	
8	Pushya – also known as sidhya or tiṣya	γ "Asellus Borealis", δ "Asellus Australis" and θ Cancri	Lord: Shani (Saturn); Symbol : Cow's udder, lotus, arrow and circle; Deity : Bṛhaspati, guru & priest of the gods; Indian zodiac: 3°20' −16°40' Karka; Western zodiac 27°06' Cancer – 10°26' Leo	
9	Āshleshā – "the embrace"	δ, ε "Āshleshā Nakshatra", η, ρ, and σ "Minchir" Hydrae	Lord: Budh (Mercury); Symbol: Serpent; Deity : Sarpas or Nagas, deified snakes; Indian zodiac: 16°40' – 30° Karka; Western zodiac 10°26' – 23°46 Leo	
10	Maghā -"the bountiful"	Regulus	Lord: Ketu (south lunar node); Symbol : Royal Throne; Deity : Pitrs, 'The Fathers', family ancestors; Indian zodiac: 0° – 13°20' Simha; Western zodiac 23°46 Leo – 7°06' Virgo	
11	Pūrva Phalgunī -"first reddish one"	δ "Zosma" and θ "Chertan" Leonis	Lord: Shukra (Venus); Symbol : Front legs of bed, hammock, fig tree; Deity : Bhaga, god of marital bliss and prosperity; Indian zodiac: 13°20' – 26°40' Simha; Western zodiac 7°06' – 20°26' Virgo	
12	Uttara Phalgunī -"second reddish one"	Denebola	Lord: Surya (Sun); Symbol: Four legs of bed, hammock; Deity : Aryaman, god of patronage and favours; Indian zodiac: 26°40' Simha- 10° Kanya; Western zodiac 20°26' Virgo – 3°46 Libra	
13	Hasta – "the hand"	α "Alchiba", β "Kraz", γ, δ "Algorab" and ε "Minkar" Corvi	Lord: Chandra (Moon); Symbol: Hand or fist; Deity : Savitri or Surya, the Sun god; Indian zodiac: 10° – 23°20' Kanya; Western zodiac 3°46 – 17°06' Libra	
14	Chitra – "the bright one", a name of Spica	Spica	Lord: Mangala (Mars); Symbol: Bright jewel or pearl; Deity : Tvastar or Vishvakarman, the celestial architect; Indian zodiac: 23°20' Kanya – 6°40' Tula; Western zodiac: 17°06' Libra – 0°26' Scorpio	
15	Svati -"Su-Ati (Sanskrit) Very good" name of Arcturus	Arcturus	Lord: Rahu (north lunar node); Symbol: Shoot of plant, coral; Deity : Vayu, the Wind god; Indian zodiac: 6°40' – 20° Tula; Western zodiac 0°26' – 13°46 Scorpio	
16	Vishakha -"forked, having branches"; also known as rādhā "the gift"	α "Zubenelgenubi", β "Zubeneschamali", γ and ι Librae	Lord: Guru (Jupiter); Symbol : Triumphal arch, potter's wheel; Deity : Indra, chief of the gods; Agni, god of Fire; Indian zodiac: 20° Tula – 3°20' Vrishchika; Western zodiac 13°46 – 27°06' Scorpio	
17	Anuradha -"following rādhā"	β "Acrab", δ "Dschubba" and π "Fang" Scorpionis	Lord: Shani (Saturn); Symbol : Triumphal archway, lotus; Deity : Mitra, one of Adityas of friendship and partnership; Indian zodiac: 3°20' – 16°40' Vrishchika; Western zodiac 27°06' Scorpio – 10°26' Sagittarius	
18	Jyeshtha – "the eldest, most excellent"	α "Antares", σ, and τ "Paikauhale" Scorpionis	Lord: Budh (Mercury); Symbol : circular amulet, umbrella, earring; Deity : Indra, chief of the gods; Indian zodiac: 16°40' – 30° Vrishchika; Western zodiac 10°26' – 23°46 Sagittarius	
19	Mula – "the root"	ε "Larawag", ζ, η, θ "Sargas", ι, κ, λ "Shaula", μ and ν "Jabbah" Scorpionis	Lord: Ketu (south lunar node); Symbol : Bunch of roots tied together, elephant goad; Deity : Nirrti, goddess of dissolution and destruction; Indian zodiac: 0° – 13°20' Dhanus; Western zodiac 23°46 Sagittarius – 7°06' Capricorn	
20	Purva Ashadha – "first of the āṣāḍhā", āṣāḍhā "the invincible one" being the name of a constellation	δ "Kaus Media" and ε "Kaus Australis" Sagittarii	Lord: Shukra (Venus); Symbol: Elephant tusk, fan, winnowing basket; Deity : Apah, god of Water; Indian zodiac: 13°20' – 26°40' Dhanus; Western zodiac 7°06' – 20°26' Capricorn	
21	Uttara Ashadha – "Later invincible"	ζ "Ascella" and σ "Nunki" Sagittarii	Lord: Surya (Sun); Symbol : Elephant tusk, small bed; Deity : Visvedevas, universal gods; Indian zodiac: 26°40' Dhanus – 10° Makara; Western zodiac 20°26' Capricorn – 3°46 Aquarius	
22	Shravana –	α "Altair", β and γ Aquilae	Lord: Chandra (Moon); Symbol : Ear or Three Footprints; Deity : Vishnu, preserver of universe; Indian zodiac: 10° – 23°20' Makara; Western zodiac 3°46 – 17°06' Aquarius	
23	Dhanishta – "most famous", also Shravishthā "swiftest"	α "Sualocin" to δ Delphini	Lord: Mangala (Mars); Symbol : Drum or flute; Deity : Eight vasus, deities of earthly abundance; Indian zodiac: 23°20' Makara – 6°40' Kumbha; Western zodiac 17°06' Aquarius – 0°26' Pisces	
24	Shatabhisha Nakshatra – "requiring a hundred physicians"	γ Aquarii "Sadachbia"	Lord: Rahu (north lunar node); Symbol : Empty circle, 1,000 flowers or stars; Deity : Varuna, god of cosmic waters, sky and earth; Indian zodiac: 6°40' – 20° Kumbha; Western zodiac 0°26' – 13°46 Pisces	
25	Purva Bhadrapada – "the first of the blessed feet"	α "Markab" and β Pegasi	Lord: Guru (Jupiter); Symbol : Swords or two front legs of funeral cot, man with two faces; Deity : Ajaikapada, one-footed aspect of Shiva; Indian zodiac: 20° Kumbha – 3°20' Meena; Western zodiac 13°46 – 27°06' Pisces	
26	Uttara Bhādrapadā – "the second of the blessed feet"	γ "Algenib" Pegasi and α "Alpheratz" Andromedae	Lord: Shani (Saturn); Symbol : Twins, back legs of funeral cot, snake in the water; Deity : Ahirbudhnya, serpent or dragon of the deep; Indian zodiac: 3°20' – 16°40' Meena; Western zodiac 27°06' Pisces – 10°26' Aries	
27	Revati – "prosperous"	ζ Piscium "Revati"	Lord: Budh (Mercury); Symbol : Fish or a pair of fish, drum; Deity : Pushan, nourisher, the protective deity; Indian zodiac: 16°40' – 30° Meena; Western zodiac 10°26' – 23°46 Aries	
28	Abhijit – "Invincible"	Lyra	Lord: vishnu (preserver); Symbol : shaligram, lotus; delight in : Swathi (15th Nakshatra); Indian zodiac: 06°40' – 10°53'20 Makara; Western zodiac	

== Padas (quarters) ==
The 27 Nakshatras cover 13°20’ of the ecliptic each. Each Nakshatra is also divided into quarters or padas of 3°20’, and the below table lists the appropriate starting sound to name the child. The 27 nakshatras, each with 4 padas, give 108, which is the number of beads in a Japa mala, indicating all the elements (ansh) of Lord Brahma

#	Name	Pada 1	Pada 2	Pada 3	Pada 4
1	Ashwini (अश्विनि)	चु Chu	चे Che	चो Cho	ला La
2	Bharani (भरणी)	ली Li	लू Lu	ले Le	लो Lo
3	Krittika (कृत्तिका)	अ A	ई I	उ U	ए E
4	Rohini (रोहिणी)	ओ O	वा Vaa/Baa	वी Vi/Bi	वु Vu/Bu
5	Mrigashīrsha(मृगशीर्ष)	वे Ve/Be	वो Vo/Bo	का Ka	की Kii
6	Ārdrā (आर्द्रा)	कु Ku	घ Gha	ङ Ng/Na	छ Chha
7	Punarvasu (पुनर्वसु)	के Ke	को Ko	हा Ha	ही Hii
8	Pushya (पुष्य)	हु Hu	हे He	हो Ho	ड ḍa
9	Āshleshā (अश्लेषा)	डी ḍi	डू ḍu	डे ḍe	डो ḍo
10	Maghā (मघा)	मा Ma	मी Mi	मू Mu	मे Me
11	Pūrva or Pūrva Phalgunī (पूर्व फल्गुनी)	मो Mo	टा ṭa	टी ṭii	टू ṭuu
12	Uttara or Uttara Phalgunī (उत्तर फल्गुनी)	टे ṭe	टो ṭo	पा Pa	पी Pi
13	Hasta (हस्त)	पू Pu	ष Sha	ण Na	ठ ṭha
14	Chitra (चित्रा)	पे Pe	पो Po	रा Ra	री Ri
15	Svātī (स्वाति)	रू Ru	रे Re	रो Ro	ता Ta
16	Viśākhā (विशाखा)	ती Ti	तू Tu	ते Te	तो To
17	Anurādhā (अनुराधा)	ना Na	नी Ni	नू Nu	ने Ne
18	Jyeshtha (ज्येष्ठा)	नो No	या Ya	यी Yi	यू Yu
19	Mula (मूल)	ये Ye	यो Yo	भा Bha	भी Bhi
20	Pūrva Āshādhā (पूर्व आषाढ़)	भू Bhu	धा Dha	फा Bha/Pha	ढा Da
21	Uttara Āṣāḍhā (उत्तर आषाढ़)	भे Bhe	भो Bho	जा Ja	जी Ji
22	Śrāvaṇa (श्र‌ावण)	खी Ju/Khii	खू Je/Khu	खे Jo/Khe	खो Gha/Kho
23	Śrāviṣṭha (श्रविष्ठा) or Dhanishta	गा Ga	गी Gii	गु Gu	गे Ge
24	Shatabhisha (शतभिषा)or Śatataraka	गो Go	सा Sa	सी Si	सू Su
25	Pūrva Bhādrapadā (पूर्व भाद्रपद)	से Se	सो So	दा Da	दी Di
26	Uttara Bhādrapadā (उत्तर भाद्रपद)	दू Du	थ Tha	झ Jha	ञ ña
27	Revati (रेवती)	दे De	दो Do	च Cha	ची Chi

== Names in Indian and Asian languages ==
The names of nakshatras in other languages are adapted from the Sanskrit variation (apabhramsa) through Pali or Prakrit. The variations evolved for easier pronunciation in popular usage.

#	Sanskrit संस्कृतम्	Odia ଓଡିଆ	Malayalam മലയാളം	Tamil தமிழ்	Saurashtra ꢱꣃꢬꢵꢯ꣄ꢡ꣄ꢬ	Sinhala සිංහල	Dhivehi ދިވެހި	Telugu తెలుగు	Kannada ಕನ್ನಡ	Bengali বাংলা	Mongolian	Chinese 宿	Tibetan བོད་སྐད། རྒྱུ་སྐར་ཉེ་བདུན།	Thai ไทย	Khmer ខ្មែរ	Burmese နက္ခတ်
1	Ashvinī अश्विनी	Aswini ଅଶ୍ଵିନୀ	Ashvati അശ്വതി	Asvini அஸ்வினி	Assuni	Aswida අස්විද	A'sidha އައްސިދަ	Ashwini అశ్విని	Ashwini ಅಶ್ವಿನಿ	Ashwini অশ্বিনী	Шийдэм	婁	ཐ་སྐར།	Asawini อัศวินี	អឝ្វិនី	အသဝနီ
2	Bharanī भरणी	Dwijaa ଦ୍ଵିଜା	Bharaṇi ഭരണി	Baraṇi பரணி	Bhorṇi	Berana බෙරණ	Burunu ބުރުނު	Bharani భరణి	Bharani ಭರಣಿ	Bharaṇi ভরণী	Гоё хүүхэн	胃	བྲ་ཉེ།	Bhorani ภรณี	ភរណី	ဘရဏီ
3	Kṛttikā कृत्तिका	Krutikaa କୃତିକା	Kārttika കാർത്തിക	Kārthigai கார்த்திகை	Katyo	Kethi කැති	Kethi ކެތި	Krittika కృత్తిక	Kritika ಕೃತಿಕ	Krittika কৃত্তিকা	Нэг эхт зургаан хөвгүүн	昴	སྨིན་དྲུག	Kritika กฤติกา	ក្ឫតិកា	ကြတ္တီကာ
4	Rohiṇī रोहिणी	Rohini ରୋହିଣୀ	Rōhiṇi രോഹിണി	Rōgiṇi ரோகிணி	Rhoyiṇi	Rehena රෙහෙණ	Roanu ރޯނު	Rohini రోహిణి	Rohini ರೋಹಿಣಿ	Rohiṇi রোহিণী	Чөлөөт эх	畢	སྣར་མ།	Rohini โรหิณี	រោហិណី	ရောဟဏီ
5	Mrigashīrsha मृगशीर्ष	Mrugasiraa ମୃଗଶିରା	Makayiram മകയിരം	Mirugasīriḍam/Mirugaḻi மிருகசீரிடம்/மிருகழி	Mrugasiro	Muwasirasa මුවසිරස	Miyaheli މިޔަހެލި	Mrugashira మృగశిర	Mrigashira ಮೃಗಶಿರ	Mrigashira মৃগশিরা	Гөрөөсөн толгой	觜	མགོ	Marukasira มฤคศิระ	ម្ឫគឝីឞ៍	မိဂသီ
6	Ārdrā आर्द्रा	Adra ଆଦ୍ରା	Ātira or Tiruvātira ആതിര (തിരുവാതിര)	Tiruvādirai திருவாதிரை	Adro	Ada අද	Adha އަދަ	Arudra ఆరుద్ర	Ardra ಆರ್ದ್ರ	Ardra আর্দ্রা	Хэрцгий охин	參	ལག	Ārathrā อารทรา	អាទ្រ៍ា	အဒြ
7	Punarvasu पुनर्वसु	punarbasu ପୁନର୍ବସୁ	Puṇartam പുണർതം	Puṉarpūsam புனர்பூசம்	Punarosu	Punavasa පුනාවස	Funoas ފުނޯސް	Punarvasu పునర్వసు	Punarvasu ಪುನರ್ವಸು	Punarbasu পুনর্বসু	Өглөгт охин	井	ནབས་སོ།	Punappasu ปุนัพพสุ	បុនវ៌សុ	ပုဏ္ဏဗသု
8	Pushya पुष्य	Pushyaa ପୁଷ୍ୟା	Pūyam പൂയം	Pūsam பூசம்	Pusse	Pusha පුෂ	Fus ފުސް	Pushya పుష్య	Pushyami ಪುಷ್ಯ	Pushya পুষ্যা	Найралт эх	鬼	རྒྱལ།	Pusaya ปุษยะ	បុឞ្យ	ဖုသျှ
9	Āshleshā आश्ळेषा / आश्लेषा	Ashleshaa ଆଶ୍ଳେଷା	Āyilyam ആയില്യം	Āyilyam ஆயில்யம்	Aslēṣo	Aslisa අස්ලිස	Ahuliha އަހުލިހަ	Ashlesha ఆశ్లేష	Ashlesha ಆಶ್ಲೇಷ	Ashleshā অশ্লেষা	Үнэг	柳	སྐག	Assalesa อัสสเลสะ	អាឝ្លោឞា	အသလိဿ
10	Maghā मघा	Magaa ମଘା	Makam മകം	Magam மகம்	Mhago	Maa මා	Maa މާ	Makha మఖ	Magha ಮಘ	Magha মঘা	Их морь	星	མཆུ།	Mākha มาฆะ	មធា	မာဃ
11	Pūrva or Pūrva Phalgunī पूर्व फल्गुनी	Purba Falguni ପୂର୍ବ ଫାଲ୍ଗୁନୀ	Pūram പൂരം	Pūram பூரம்	Puva Phaguṇi	Puwapal පුවපල්	Fura ފުރަ	Pubba పుబ్బ	Poorva ಪೂರ್ವ	Purbaphālguni পূর্বফাল্গুনী	Бага морь	張	གྲེ།	Burapa Pholkuni บุรพผลคุณี	បូវ៌ផាផាល្គុនី	ပြုဗ္ဗဖလရုနီ
12	Uttara or Uttara Phalgunī उत्तर फल्गुनी	Uttara falguni ଉତ୍ତର ଫାଲ୍ଗୁନୀ	Utram ഉത്രം	Uttiram உத்திரம்	Uttar Phaguni	Uttrapal උත්රපල්	Uthura އުތުރަ	Uttara ఉత్తర	Uttara ಉತ್ತರ	Uttar Phālguni উত্তরফাল্গুনী	Харцага	翼	དབོ།	Utra Pholkuni อุตรผลคุณี	ឧត្តរផាល្គុនី	ဥတ္တရဖလရုနီ
13	Hasta हस्त	Hastaa ହସ୍ତା	Attam അത്തം	Asttam அஸ்தம்	Hāt	Hatha හත	Atha އަތަ	Hasta హస్త	Hastaa ಹಸ್ತ	Hastā হস্তা	Тугчин	軫	མེ་བཞི།	Hattha หัตถะ	ហស្ត	ဟဿတ
14	Chitrā चित्रा	Citraa ଚିତ୍ରା	Cittira ചിത്തിര (ചിത്ര)	Cittirai சித்திரை	chito	Sitha සිත	Hitha ހިތަ	Chitta చిత్త	Chitra ಚಿತ್ರ	Chitrā চিত্রা	Тэргүүн дагуул	角	ནག་པ།	Chitrā จิตรา	ចិត្រា	စိတြ
15	Svātī स्वाती	Swati ସ୍ଵାତୀ	Chōti ചോതി	Suvāti சுவாதி	Svādi	Saa සා	Hey ހޭ	Swathi స్వాతి	Swathi ಸ್ವಾತಿ	Swāti স্বাতী	Салхины эх	亢	ས་རི།	Svātī สวาติ	ស្វាតិ	သွာတိ
16	Vishākhā विशाखा	Bishakha ବିଶାଖା	Vishākham വിശാഖം	Visākam விசாகம்	Visāho	Wisa විසා	Vihaa ވިހާ	Vishakha విశాఖ	Vishakha ವಿಶಾಖ	Bishakha বিশাখা	Эрхтний тэнгэрт	氐	ས་ག	Vishākha วิสาขะ	វិឝាខា	ဝိသာခါ
17	Anurādhā अनुराधा	Anuradha ଅନୁରାଧା	Anizham അനിഴം	Anusham அனுஷம்	Anrādo	Anura අනුර	Nora ނޮރަ	Anuradha అనురాధ	Anuradha ಅನುರಾಧಾ	Anuradha অনুরাধা	Гар од	房	ལྷ་མཚམས།	Anuratha อนุราธะ	អនុរាធា	အနုရာဓ
18	Jyeshtha ज्येष्ठा	Jyosthaa ଜ୍ୟୋଷ୍ଠା	Kēṭṭa (Trikkēṭṭa) തൃക്കേട്ട	Kēṭṭai கேட்டை	Jheṭṭo	Deta දෙට	Dhosha ދޮށަ	Jyeshtha జ్యేష్ఠ	Jyeshtha ಜ್ಯೇಷ್ಠ	Jyestha জ্যেষ্ঠা	Хонгорцог	心	སྣྲོན།	Shettha เชฏฐะ	ជេ្យឞ្ឋា	ဇေဋ္ဌ
19	Mūla मूल	Mulaa ମୂଳା	Mūlam മൂലം	Mūlam மூலம்	Mūļ	Moola මුල	Mula މުލަ	Moola మూల	Moola ಮೂಲ	Mula মূলা	Онгоц	尾	སྣུབས།	Mula มูละ	មូល	မူလ
20	Pūrva Ashādhā पूर्वाषाढा	Purbasaadhaa ପୂର୍ବାଷାଢା	Pūrāṭam പൂരാടം	Pūrāṭam பூராடம்	Pūr Hasaḍo	Puwasala පුවසල	Furahalha ފުރަހަޅަ	Poorvashadha పూర్వాషాఢ	Poorvashadha ಪುರ್ವಾಷಾಡ	Poorbashada পূর্বাষাঢ়া	Суулга	箕	ཆུ་སྟོད།	Burapasādh บุรพษาฒ	បូវ៌ាឞាឍា	ပြုဗ္ဗာသာဠ်
21	Uttara Ashādhā उत्तराषाढा	Uttarasaadha ଉତ୍ତରଷାଢା	Utrāṭam ഉത്രാടം	Uttirāṭam உத்திராடம்	Uttar Hasaḍo	Uttrasala උත්රසල	Uthurahalha އުތުރަހަޅަ	Uttarashadha ఉత్తరాషాఢ	Uttarashadha ಉತ್ತರಾಷಾಡ	Uttarashada উত্তরাষাঢ়া	Элдэв тэнгэртэн	斗	ཆུ་སྨད།	Utrāsādh อุตราษาฒ	ឧត្តរឞាឍា	ဥတ္တရာသာဠ်
22	Shravana श्रवण	Sravana ଶ୍ରବଣା	Tiruvōnam ഓണം (തിരുവോണം)	Tiruvōnam திருவோணம்	Sravaṇ	Suvana සුවණ	Huvan ހުވަން	Shravana శ్రవణ	Shravana ಶ್ರವಣ	Shraban শ্রবণা	Булаагч/Яруу эгшигт	女	གྲོ་བཞིན།	Saravana ศรวณะ	ឝ្រវណ	သရဝဏ်
23	Shravishthā or Dhanishta श्रविष्ठा or धनिष्ठा	Dhanishathaa ଧନିଷ୍ଠା	Aviṭṭam അവിട്ടം	Aviṭṭam அவிட்டம்	Dhaniṭṭo	Denata දෙණට	Dhinasha ދިނަށަ	Dhanishta ధనిష్ఠ	Dhanishta ಧನಿಷ್ಠ	Dhanishta ধনিষ্ঠা	Тооно	虛	མོན་གྲེ།	Thanistha ธนิษฐะ	ធនិឞ្ធា	ဓနသိဒ္ဓ
24	Shatabhishā or Shatataraka शतभिषक् / शततारका	Satavisaa ସତଭିଷା	Chatayam ചതയം	Sadayam சதயம்	Sōhiso	Siyawasa සියාවස	Hiyavihaa ހިޔަވިހާ	Shatabhisha శతభిష	Shatabhisha ಶತಭಿಷ	Shatabhisha শতভিষা	Чөдөр	危	མོན་གྲུ	Satabhisat ศตภิษัต	ឝតភិឞក៑	သတဘိသျှ
25	Pūrva Bhādrapadā पूर्वभाद्रपदा / पूर्वप्रोष्ठपदा	Purba vadrapada ପୂର୍ବଭାଦ୍ରପଦ	Pūruruṭṭāti പൂരുരുട്ടാതി	Pūraṭṭādi பூரட்டாதி	Pūra Bhoddurpado	Puvaputupa පුවපුටුප	Furabadhuruva ފުރަބަދުރުވަ	Poorvabhadra పూర్వాభాద్ర	Poorva Bhadrapada ಪೂರ್ವ ಭಾದ್ರಪದ	Poorbabhadra পূর্বভাদ্রপদ	Шувуун хошуут	室	ཁྲུམས་སྟོད།	Burapa Pattrabot บุรพภัทรบท	បូវ៌ភាទ្របទា	ပြုဗ္ဗဘဒြပိုဒ်
26	Uttara Bhādrapadā उत्तरभाद्रपदा / उत्तरप्रोष्ठपदा	Uttara vadrapada ଉତ୍ତରାଭାଦ୍ରପଦ	Uttṛṭṭāti ഉത്രട്ടാതി	Uttiraṭṭādi உத்திரட்டாதி	Uttar Bhoddurpado	Uttraputupa උත්රපුටුප	Fasbadhuruva ފަސްބަދުރުވަ	Uttarabhadra ఉత్తరాభాద్ర	Uttara Bhadrapada ಉತ್ತರ ಭಾದ್ರಪದ	Uttarbabhadra উত্তরভাদ্রপদ	Могой хүлэгч	壁	ཁྲུམས་སྨད།	Utra Pattrabot อุตรภัทรบท	ឧត្តរភាទ្របទា	ဥတ္တဘဒြပိုဒ်
27	Revati रेवती	Revati ରେବତୀ	Rēvati രേവതി	Rēvati ரேவதி	Rēvati	Revathi රේවතී	Reyva ރޭވަ	Revati రేవతి	Revati ರೇವತಿ	Rebati রেবতী	Дэлгэрүүлэгч	奎	ནམ་གྲུ།	Revadi เรวดี	រេវតី	ရေဝတီ
