= Ashlesha =

9th lunar mansion in Hindu astronomy

Ashlesha (Sanskrit: आश्लेषा or Āśleṣā; Tibetan: སྐར་མ་སྐག), meaning "the embrace", is the 9th of the 27 nakshatras (lunar mansions) in Indian astronomy and astrology. It corresponds to a group of stars in the constellation Hydra: δ, ε, η, ρ, and σ Hydrae. The main star (yogatara) is ε Hydrae, which has the modern name Ashlesha after the nakshatra.

It is also known as Ayilyam in Tamil and Malayalam (Tamil: ஆயில்யம், Malayalam: ആയില്യം, Āyilyaṃ). Ashlesha is also known as the Clinging Star or Nāga. It extends from 16:40 to 30:00 in Cancer.

The nakshatra's symbol is a coiled serpent. It is a Trikshana or Three eyed. Its animal symbol is the male Cat, Gana Rakshasa, Dosha (Kapha).

== See also ==
- List of Nakshatras
- Hydra
