= Zeta Hydrae =

Star in the constellation Hydra

ζ Hydrae
- Location of ζ Hydrae (circled)

Observation data Epoch J2000.0 Equinox ICRS
- Constellation: Hydra
- Right ascension: 08^{h} 55^{m} 23.62614^{s}
- Declination: +05° 56′ 44.0354″
- Apparent magnitude (V): 3.10

Characteristics
- Spectral type: G9 II-III
- U−B color index: +0.82
- B−V color index: +1.00

Astrometry
Radial velocity (R_{v})	+22.8 km/s
Proper motion (μ)	RA: –100.06 mas/yr Dec.: +15.46 mas/yr
Parallax (π)	19.51±0.18 mas
Distance	167 ± 2 ly (51.3 ± 0.5 pc)
Absolute magnitude (M_{V})	–0.24

Details
Mass	3.09±0.1 M_{☉}
Radius	17.61±0.19 R_{☉}
Luminosity	174.2±9.3 L_{☉}
Surface gravity (log g)	2.48 cgs
Temperature	4,996±30 K
Metallicity [Fe/H]	–0.21 dex
Rotational velocity (v sin i)	2.5 km/s
Age	370±40 Myr

Other designations
- 16 Hydrae, BD+06 2060, FK5 334, HD 76294, HIP 43813, HR 3547, SAO 117264

Database references
SIMBAD	data

Zeta Hydrae (ζ Hya, ζ Hydrae) is a solitary star in the equatorial constellation of Hydra. This is a generally faint constellation, so, at an apparent visual magnitude of +3.10, this is the third-brightest member after Alphard and Naga.

== Distance ==
The distance to this star has been measured using the parallax technique, yielding a value of roughly 167 light-years (51 parsecs). At this distance, the visual magnitude of the star is diminished by 0.03 as a result of extinction from intervening gas and dust. Delta Hydrae is about 12.9 light-years (4.0 parsecs) from Zeta Hydrae and may be a largely co-moving object. The star has one of the lower-error margin readings among those of the Gaia spacecraft which computes a parallax of 20.7182 ± 0.3925 mas and, if correct, a distance of 157 ± 3 light years.

== Characteristics ==
With a stellar classification of G9 II-III, this is an evolved giant star that is radiating 174 times the luminosity of the Sun from its outer envelope at an effective temperature of around 5,000 K. At this heat, the star glows with the yellow hue of a G-type star. The radius of this star, measured using interferometry, is 17.6 times the Sun's radius. It has an estimated 3.1 times the mass of the Sun and is around 370 million years old.

== Name and etymology ==
This star, along with δ Hya (Lisan al Sudja), ε Hya, η Hya, ρ Hya and σ Hya (Minchir), were Ulug Beg's Min al Azʽal, "Belonging to the Uninhabited Spot". According to the catalogue of stars in the Technical Memorandum 33-507 - A Reduced Star Catalog Containing 537 Named Stars, Min al Azʽal or Minazal were the title for five stars:δ Hya as Minazal I, η Hya as Minazal II, ε Hya as Minazal III, ρ Hya as Minazal IV and ζ Hya as Minazal V (exclude σ Hya).

In Chinese, 柳宿 (Liǔ Sù), meaning Willow, refers to an asterism consisting of ζ Hydrae, δ Hydra, σ Hydrae, η Hydrae, ρ Hydrae, ε Hydrae, ω Hydrae and θ Hydrae Consequently, ζ Hydrae itself is known as 柳宿六 (Liǔ Sù liù, English: the Sixth Star of Willow).

The people of Groote Eylandt called Unwala, "The Crab", for the star cluster including this star, δ Hya (Lisan al Sudja), ε Hya (Ashlesha), η Hya, ρ Hya and σ Hya (Minchir).
