= Eta Hydrae =

Star in the constellation Hydra

η Hydrae
- Location of η Hydrae (circled)

Observation data Epoch J2000.0 Equinox J2000.0 (ICRS)
- Constellation: Hydra
- Right ascension: 08^{h} 43^{m} 13.47499^{s}
- Declination: +03° 23′ 55.1867″
- Apparent magnitude (V): 4.294

Characteristics
- Evolutionary stage: main sequence
- Spectral type: B3 V
- U−B color index: −0.726
- B−V color index: −0.187
- Variable type: Candidate β Cep

Astrometry
Proper motion (μ)	RA: −19.39 mas/yr Dec.: −1.08 mas/yr
Parallax (π)	5.56±0.24 mas
Distance	590 ± 30 ly (180 ± 8 pc)
Absolute magnitude (M_{V})	−1.48

Details
Mass	7.0±0.1 M_{☉}
Radius	3.9 R_{☉}
Luminosity (bolometric)	2,680 L_{☉}
Surface gravity (log g)	3.933 cgs
Temperature	18,630±411 K
Rotational velocity (v sin i)	101±5 km/s
Age	31.6±3.9 Myr

Other designations
- η Hya, 7 Hydrae, BD+03°2039, FK5 2687, HD 74280, HIP 42799, HR 3454, SAO 117050

Database references
SIMBAD	data

Eta Hydrae (η Hydrae) is a star in the equatorial constellation of Hydra. With an apparent visual magnitude of 4.3, it is visible to the naked eye. However, it is the faintest of the five stars that form the "head" of the hydra. Based upon an annual parallax shift of 5.56 mas, it is located roughly 590 light years from the Sun.

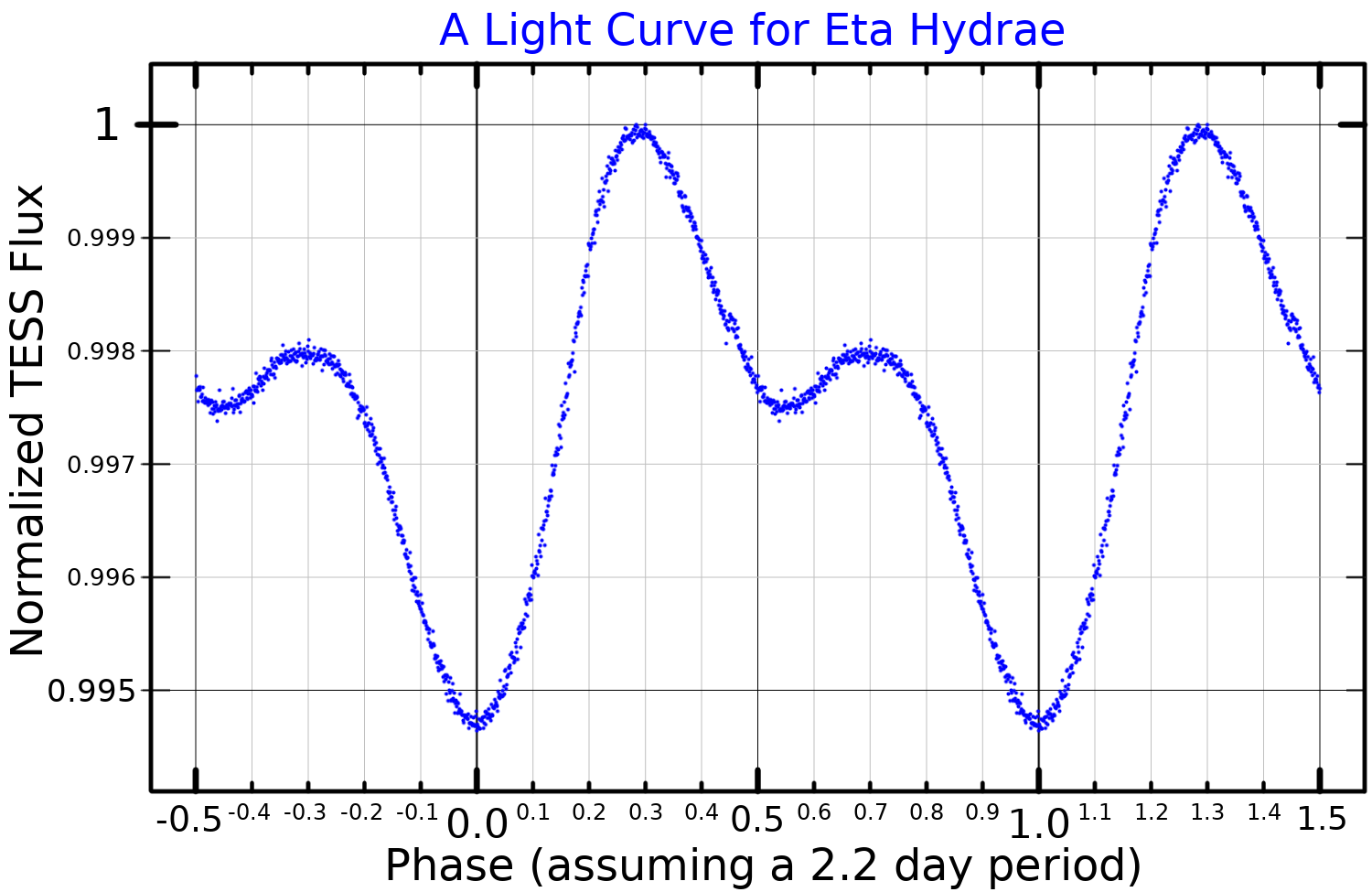
A light curve for Eta Hydrae, plotted from TESS data

This is a B-type main sequence star with a stellar classification of B3V. It has been classified as a candidate Beta Cephei variable with a period of 2.2 days, although this designation was rejected by Stankov and Handler (2005). The spectrum shows a slight underabundance of carbon, compared to the Sun. The star is around 32 million years old and is spinning with a projected rotational velocity of 101 km/s. It has an estimated seven times the mass of the Sun and nearly four times the Sun's radius. Eta Hydrae radiates 2,680 times the solar luminosity from its outer atmosphere at an effective temperature of 18,630 K.

== Name and etymology ==
This star, along with δ Hya (Lisan al Sudja), ε Hya, ζ Hya, ρ Hya and σ Hya (Minchir), were Ulug Beg's Min al Azʽal, "Belonging to the Uninhabited Spot". According to the catalogue of stars in the Technical Memorandum 33-507 - A Reduced Star Catalog Containing 537 Named Stars, Min al Azʽal or Minazal were the title for five stars:δ Hya as Minazal I, η Hya as Minazal II, ε Hya as Minazal III, ρ Hya as Minazal IV and ζ Hya as Minazal V (exclude σ Hya).

In Chinese, 柳宿 (Liǔ Sù), meaning Willow, refers to an asterism consisting of η Hydrae, δ Hydra, σ Hydrae, ρ Hydrae, ε Hydrae, ζ Hydrae, ω Hydrae and θ Hydrae Consequently, η Hydrae itself is known as 柳宿三 (Liǔ Sù sān, English: the Third Star of Willow).

The people of Groote Eylandt called Unwala, "The Crab", for the star cluster including this star, δ Hya (Lisan al Sudja), ε Hya (Ashlesha), ζ Hya, ρ Hya and σ Hya (Minchir).
