= Rho Hydrae =

Binary star in the constellation Hydra

- Location of ρ Hydrae (circled)

Observation data Epoch J2000.0 Equinox J2000.0 (ICRS)
- Constellation: Hydra
- Right ascension: 08^{h} 48^{m} 25.97057^{s}
- Declination: +05° 50′ 16.1283″
- Apparent magnitude (V): 4.34

Characteristics
- Evolutionary stage: subgiant
- Spectral type: A0 Vn
- U−B color index: −0.04
- B−V color index: −0.04

Astrometry
Radial velocity (R_{v})	+32.8 km/s
Proper motion (μ)	RA: −17.33 mas/yr Dec.: −29.41 mas/yr
Parallax (π)	9.21±0.21 mas
Distance	354 ± 8 ly (109 ± 2 pc)
Absolute magnitude (M_{V})	−0.83

Details
Mass	3.24±0.05 M_{☉}
Radius	5.04 R_{☉}
Luminosity	242 L_{☉}
Temperature	9,795 K
Rotational velocity (v sin i)	128 km/s
Age	350 Myr

Other designations
- ρ Hya, 13 Hya, BD+06°2040, HD 75137, HIP 43234, HR 3492, SAO 117146

Database references
SIMBAD	data

Rho Hydrae, equally written ρ Hydrae, is a binary star in the equatorial constellation of Hydra. It is visible to the naked eye with an apparent visual magnitude of 4.34. The distance to this system, based upon an annual parallax shift of 9.21 mas, is about 354 light years. At that distance, the visual magnitude is diminished by an interstellar extinction of 0.06 magnitudes, due to intervening dust.

The primary component has an stellar classification of A0 Vn, suggesting that it is an A-type main sequence star, but stellar evolution models indicate it has left the main sequence and is thus a subgiant star. It has 5.04 the radius of the Sun and 3.2 times the Sun's mass. Rho Hydrae is around 350 million years old and has a high rate of spin, with a projected rotational velocity of 128 km/s. It radiates 242 times the solar luminosity from its outer atmosphere at an effective temperature of 9,795 K. The companion is a magnitude 11.9 star at an angular separation of 12.1 arc seconds along a position angle of 146°, as of 2000.

== Name and etymology ==
This system appears among bright stars in a compact pentagon, resembling a quadrilateral due to the suggestive proximity (close arc distance) to Epsilon Hydrae (ε Hya). This shape in the Greco-Roman tradition, which draws on trading and navigation histories shared with nearby older-recorded astrologies is an asterism that represents the head of the water snake.

This light source, along with comparable strength (apparent magnitude) Epsilon, δ Hya (Lisan al Sudja), ζ Hya, η Hya, and σ Hya (Minchir), were Ulug Beg's Min al Azʽal, "Belonging to the Uninhabited Spot". According to the catalogue of stars in the Technical Memorandum 33-507 - A Reduced Star Catalog Containing 537 Named Stars, Min al Azʽal or Minazal were the title for five stars: δ Hya as Minazal I, η Hya as Minazal II, ε Hya as Minazal III, ρ Hya as Minazal IV and ζ Hya as Minazal V (exclude σ Hya).

In Chinese, 柳宿 (Liǔ Sù), meaning Willow, refers to an asterism consisting of ρ Hydrae, δ Hydra, σ Hydrae, η Hydrae, ε Hydrae, ζ Hydrae, ω Hydrae and θ Hydrae Consequently, ρ Hydrae itself is known as 柳宿四 (Liǔ Sù sì, English: the Fourth Star of Willow).

The people of Groote Eylandt called Unwala, "The Crab", for the star cluster including this star, δ Hya (Lisan al Sudja), ε Hya (Ashlesha), η Hya, ζ Hya and σ Hya (Minchir).
