= Delta Hydrae =

Double star system in the constellation Hydra

- Location of δ Hydrae (circled in red)

Observation data Epoch J2000.0 Equinox J2000.0 (ICRS)
- Constellation: Hydra
- Right ascension: 08^{h} 37^{m} 39.36627^{s}
- Declination: +05° 42′ 13.6057″
- Apparent magnitude (V): 4.146

Characteristics

δ Hydrae Aa
- Spectral type: A1 Vnn
- U−B color index: +0.003
- B−V color index: +0.008

Astrometry
Radial velocity (R_{v})	4.10 km/s
Proper motion (μ)	RA: −70.19 mas/yr Dec.: −7.90 mas/yr
Parallax (π)	20.34±0.63 mas
Distance	160 ± 5 ly (49 ± 2 pc)
Absolute magnitude (M_{V})	+0.68

Position (relative to δ Hydrae A)
Component	δ Hydrae B
Angular distance	2.6±0.1″
Position angle	265.1±1.0°
Projected separation	147 AU

Orbit
Primary	Aa
Name	Ab
Period (P)	~200 days
Semi-major axis (a)	0.9 AU

Details

δ Hydrae Aa
Mass	2.43 M_{☉}
Radius	3.1 R_{☉}
Luminosity	42.7 L_{☉}
Temperature	8,995 K
Rotational velocity (v sin i)	285 km/s
Age	500 Myr

δ Hydrae Ab
Mass	0.58 M_{☉}
Radius	0.54 R_{☉}
Temperature	3,973 K
Age	500 Myr

δ Hydrae B
Mass	0.44 M_{☉}

Other designations
- δ Hya, 4 Hydrae, BD+06°2001, FK5 1223, HD 73262, HIP 42313, HR 3410, SAO 116965

Database references
SIMBAD	data

Delta Hydrae, Latinized from δ Hydrae, is a triple star in the equatorial constellation of Hydra. It is visible to the naked eye with an apparent visual magnitude of 4.146. Based upon an annual parallax shift of 20.34 mas, it is located about 160 light years distant.

== Characteristics ==
This is a hierarchical triple system. δ Hydrae Aa and δ Hydrae Ab form a close binary system with an orbital separation of 0.9 astronomical units, taking about 200 days to complete an orbit. The outer companion, δ Hydrae B, has an angular separation of 2.6±0.1 arc second from the Aa–Ab pair, along a position angle of 265.1°±1.0°, as of 2003. At the system's distance, this separation translates in a physical projected separation of 147 AU.

The brighter component, δ Hydrae Aa, is an A-type main sequence star with a stellar classification of A1 Vnn. It is spinning rapidly with a projected rotational velocity of 285 km/s. This is giving the star an oblate shape with an equatorial bulge that is 20% larger than the polar radius. It has an estimated 2.43 times the mass of the Sun and 3.1 times the Sun's radius. The star radiates 42.7 times the solar luminosity from its photosphere at an effective temperature of 8,995 K.

Its inner companion, δ Hydrae Ab, is a red dwarf star, with 0.58 times the mass, 0.54 times the Sun's radius, and an effective temperature of 3,973 K. It may form a common envelope system when the primary evolve into a red giant.

The outer companion has a visual magnitude of 11.15. X-ray emissions have been detected from this location in space, which may be coming from a companion star.

== Name and etymology ==
In the catalogue of stars in the Calendarium of Al Achsasi Al Mouakket, this star was designated Lisan al Shudja, which was translated into Latin as Lingua Hydri, meaning the snake's tongue. This star, along with ε Hya, ζ Hya, η Hya, ρ Hya and σ Hya (Minchir), were Ulugh Beg's Min al Azʽal, "Belonging to the Uninhabited Spot".

According to the catalogue of stars in the Technical Memorandum 33-507 - A Reduced Star Catalog Containing 537 Named Stars, Min al Azʽal or Minazal were the title for five stars: δ Hya as Minazal I, η Hya as Minazal II, ε Hya as Minazal III, ρ Hya as Minazal IV and ζ Hya as Minazal V (exclude σ Hya)

In Chinese, 柳宿 (Liǔ Sù), meaning Willow (asterism), refers to an asterism consisting of δ Hydrae, σ Hydrae, η Hydrae, ρ Hydrae, ε Hydrae, ζ Hydrae, ω Hydrae and θ Hydrae Consequently, δ Hydrae itself is known as 柳宿一 (Liǔ Sù yī, English: the First Star of Willow.)

The people of Groote Eylandt called Unwala, "The Crab", for the star cluster including this star, ε Hya (Ashlesha), ζ Hya, η Hya, ρ Hya and σ Hya (Minchir).

== See also ==
- Lambda Muscae, another A star with two low-mass companions
