= Pushya =

8th lunar mansion in Hindu astronomy

Pushya (Sanskrit: पुष्य), meaning "the nourisher", is the 8th nakshatra (lunar mansion) in Indian astronomy. Some texts refer to it as Tishya, meaning "to look". It corresponds to the stars γ, δ, and θ Cancri in the constellation Cancer, which surround the Beehive Cluster (Praesepe, M44). Its appearance is described in Indian star catalogs as meghavt "cloudy", referring to the star cluster. Pushya is known as Pushyami (పుష్యమి) in Telugu, Poosam (பூசம்) in Tamil, and Pooyam (പൂയം) in Malayalam.
