= Delta Cancrids =

Meteor shower

The Delta Cancrids is a medium strength meteor shower lasting from December 14 to February 14, the main shower from January 1 to January 24. The radiant is located in the constellation of Cancer, near Delta Cancri. It peaks on January 17 each year, with only four meteors per hour. It was first discovered in 1872, but the first solid evidence of this phenomenon came in 1971. The source of this meteor shower is unknown, it has been suggested that it is similar to the orbit of asteroid 2001 YB5.
