= Shashenk =

Shashenk may be a misspelling of:

- Shashank
- Shawshank

== See also ==
- Shoshenq
