= D Cancri =

The Bayer designation d Cancri is shared by two star systems in the constellation Cancer:

- d^{1} Cancri (20 Cancri)
- d^{2} Cancri (25 Cancri)

== See also ==
- δ Cancri
