= Sigma Hydrae =

Star in the constellation Hydra

- Location of σ Hydrae (circled in red)

Observation data Epoch J2000.0 Equinox J2000.0 (ICRS)
- Constellation: Hydra
- Right ascension: 08^{h} 38^{m} 45.43747^{s}
- Declination: +03° 20′ 29.1701″
- Apparent magnitude (V): 4.48

Characteristics
- Evolutionary stage: Horizontal branch
- Spectral type: K2 III
- U−B color index: +1.23
- B−V color index: +1.21

Astrometry
Radial velocity (R_{v})	27.28±0.19 km/s
Proper motion (μ)	RA: −19.48 mas/yr Dec.: −15.92 mas/yr
Parallax (π)	8.75±0.25 mas
Distance	370 ± 10 ly (114 ± 3 pc)
Absolute magnitude (M_{V})	−0.84

Details
Mass	2.83+0.65 −0.73 M_{☉}
Radius	27.8+2.2 −1.8 R_{☉}
Luminosity	288+37 −35 L_{☉}
Surface gravity (log g)	2.21±0.13 cgs
Temperature	4,491±51 K
Metallicity [Fe/H]	0.13±0.06 dex
Age	440+400 −180 Myr

Other designations
- Minchir, σ Hya, 5 Hydrae, BD+03°2026, FK5 1224, HD 73471, HIP 42402, HR 3418, SAO 116988

Database references
SIMBAD	data

Sigma Hydrae (σ Hydrae, abbreviated Sigma Hya, σ Hya), also named Minchir /ˈmɪŋkər/, is a solitary star in the equatorial constellation of Hydra. It is visible to the naked eye with an apparent visual magnitude of 4.48. The estimated distance to this star from the Sun, based upon an annual parallax shift of 8.75 mas, is around 370 light-years. At that distance, the visual magnitude of the star is diminished by an interstellar extinction factor of 0.16, due to intervening dust.

== Nomenclature ==
σ Hydrae (Latinised to Sigma Hydrae) is the system's Bayer designation.

It bore the traditional name Minchir, appearing as Minchir es-schudscha in Bode's large star atlas, Uranographia. The name which derived from the Arabic appelationمنخر الشجاع minkhar ash-shujāʽ "the nostril brave one" (the hydra) for this star. The name is erroneously spelt as Al Minliar al Shuja in the Yale Bright Star Catalogue. In 2016, the IAU organized a Working Group on Star Names (WGSN) to catalog and standardize proper names for stars. The WGSN approved the name Minchir for this star on 5 September 2017 and it is now so included in the List of IAU-approved Star Names.

This star, along with Delta Hydrae (Lisan al Shudja), Epsilon Hydrae, Zeta Hydrae, Eta Hydrae and Rho Hydrae, were Ulug Beg's Min al Azʽal, "Belonging to the Uninhabited Spot". (According to a 1971 NASA memorandum, Min al Azʽal or Minazal were the title for five stars: Delta Hydrae as Minazal I, Eta Hydrae as Minazal II, Epsilon Hydrae as Minazal III, Rho Hydrae as Minazal IV and Zeta Hydrae as Minazal V.)

In Chinese, 柳宿 (Liǔ Sù), meaning Willow (asterism), refers to an asterism consisting of Sigma Hydrae, Delta Hydrae, Eta Hydrae, Rho Hydrae, Epsilon Hydrae, Zeta Hydrae, Omega Hydrae and Theta Hydrae. Consequently, Sigma Hydrae itself is known as 柳宿二 (Liǔ Sù èr, English: the Second Star of Willow).

The people of Groote Eylandt, used the name Unwala ("The Crab") for the star cluster including this star, Delta Hydrae (Lisan al Shudja), Epsilon Hydrae (Ashlesha), Zeta Hydrae, Eta Hydrae and Rho Hydrae.

== Properties ==
This is an evolved K-type giant star with a stellar classification of K2 III. It is likely on the horizontal branch, generating energy by the thermonuclear fusion of helium. It has 2.8 times the mass of the Sun, 28 times the Sun's radius and radiates 290 times the solar luminosity from its photosphere at an effective temperature of 4,491 K. Sigma Hydrae is around 440 million years old.
