= Somalamma =

Hindu Devi that protects Soma

- Soma
- Other names: Somanayaki Amma
- Consort: Somanātha

Somalamma, also called Somanalamma and Somanayaki Amma, is a Hindu devi (goddess) who protects soma and gives soma to her devotees to relieve their health and mental symptoms.

== Soma ==
Soma (Sanskrit: सोम), or Haoma (Avestan), from Proto-Indo-Iranian *sauma-, was an important ritual drink for early Indo-Iranian peoples, and the later Vedic and greater Persian cultures. It is frequently mentioned in the Rigveda, which contains many hymns praising its energising qualities. In the Avesta, haoma has an entire Yasht dedicated to it.

In the Vedas, soma is personified as sacred and divine (deva). The god, the drink, and the plant probably referred to the same entity, or at least the difference was ambiguous. In this aspect, soma is similar to the Greek ambrosia (cognate to amrita); it is what the gods drink and what makes them deities. Indra and Agni are portrayed as consuming Soma in copious quantities. The consumption of soma by human beings was probably under the belief that it bestowed divine qualities on them.

== Temples ==
The goddess Somalamma temples are mainly governed by the Goud communities. Every year, there is a gathering of many of her devotees in various temples in Andhra Pradesh.

- Somalamma temple, Gaigalapadu, Kakinada
- Somalamma temple Rajamundry-533103
- Somalamma temple Jangareddy Gudem, West Godavari
- Somalamma temple Undrajavaram,Denduluru Mandal,Eluru District
- Somajiguda, Hyderabad
- Somaram, Somavaram, Warangal
- Somaram, Somavaram, Nalgonda
- Somarajapuram, Kothuru, Srikakulam
- Somavaram, Chatrai mandal, Krishna dt
- Somavaram Nandigama mandal
- Somavarappadu, Pedaparupudi mandal
- Somasundarapalem, Tenali, Guntur dt
- Somavaram, Wyra mandal, Khammam
- Somaram, Saidapur mandal, Karim Nagar
- Somanpalle, Jagityal mandal
- Somaram Tidwai, Nizamabad dt
- Somapuram, Gadivemula, Kurnool
- Somalavandlapalli, Talupula, Ananthapur
- Somalapuram, Dhirehal
- Somaghtta, Chilamattu
- Somapuram, Pedduru, Chittoor
- Somanadhapuram, Penumur mandal
- Somalagadda village, Madanapalle mandal
- Somarajulapalle, Kvpalle mandal

== See also ==
- Renuka
