= Ardra (nakshatra) =

6th lunar mansion in Hindu astrology

Orion constellation map; Betelgeuse and γ Geminorum are labeled

Ardra (आर्द्रा), meaning "wetness", is the sixth nakshatra (lunar mansion) in Hindu astronomy, also called Rudra. It is represented by the star γ Geminorum (Alhena) in the constellation Gemini, but is frequently misidentified as Betelgeuse in Orion. The nakshatras are evenly spaced 13°20 apart, corresponding to the mean daily motion of the Moon, but Betelgeuse is only 5° from the neighboring nakshatra Mrigashira (λ Orionis). Alhena is a better match for Ardra's position.

The Sun is near Ardra in May to June, the beginning of the monsoon season of intense rain in India. A traditional proverb says, "A good Ardra rain is a boon, there is no famine."

== Astrology ==
Ardra Nakshatra is governed by Rahu, the North Node of the Moon, which adds intensity and transformative qualities to the influence of this Nakshatra. The ruling deity of Ardra Nakshatra is Rudra, a form of Lord Shiva known for his destructive yet regenerative powers. This Nakshatra is considered to be of a Tamasic nature, representing the darker aspects of existence.

=== Symbolism and Characteristics ===
The symbol of Ardra Nakshatra is a teardrop, signifying emotional depth and sensitivity. According to Vedic astrology, people born under this Nakshatra may be often characterized by their intense emotions and the ability to experience profound transformations. They possess a deep sense of compassion, empathy, and understanding, but can also be prone to mood swings and emotional turmoil.

Ardra in Tamil Vedic Astrology

Ardra Nakshatra is known as Thiruvathirai in Tamil. In traditional astrology, Thirvathirai is associated with Rudra as presiding deity and Rahu as its Ruling Planet. Its conventional symbols include a teardrop and a diamond.It is also called as Betelgeuse or Alpha Orionis in English. It is the Sixth nakshatra in the traditional tamil hindu astrological system. In Tamil tradition, the nakshatra is asociated with Lord Shiva, who is referred to as Athiraiyan in tamil. Thiruvathirai is also asociated with Arudra Darisanam, a Shaiva observance celebrated during tamil month of Marghazhi (December- January), particularly at the Nataraja Temple in Chidambaram. The Tamil Literary work Kalithogai (one of the works in Ettuthokai, the eight anthologies of classical tamil sangam literature) contains a reference to Athiraiyan in a verse describing the beauty of champak (Senbagam in tamil) flower.

== See also ==
- List of Nakshatras
