= Eta Cancri =

Star in the constellation Cancer

η Cancri
- Location of η Cancri (circled)

Observation data Epoch J2000 Equinox ICRS
- Constellation: Cancer
- Right ascension: 08^{h} 32^{m} 42.496^{s}
- Declination: +20° 26′ 28.18″
- Apparent magnitude (V): 5.34

Characteristics
- Evolutionary stage: red giant branch
- Spectral type: K3 III
- U−B color index: +1.40
- B−V color index: +1.25

Astrometry
Radial velocity (R_{v})	+22.46 km/s
Proper motion (μ)	RA: −46.573 mas/yr Dec.: −44.296 mas/yr
Parallax (π)	10.258±0.088 mas
Distance	318 ± 3 ly (97.5 ± 0.8 pc)
Absolute magnitude (M_{V})	+0.44

Details
Mass	1.51 M_{☉}
Radius	17 R_{☉}
Luminosity	87 L_{☉}
Surface gravity (log g)	2.1 cgs
Temperature	4,415±57 K
Metallicity [Fe/H]	0.07±0.21 dex
Rotational velocity (v sin i)	2.7 km/s
Age	3.92 Gyr

Other designations
- η Cnc, 33 Cnc, BD+20°2109, FK5 321, GC 11687, HD 72292, HIP 41909, HR 3366, SAO 80243

Database references
SIMBAD	data

Eta Cancri is a single, orange-hued star in the zodiac constellation of Cancer. Its name is a Bayer designation that is Latinied from η Cancri, and abbreviated Eta Cnc or η Cnc. This is a faint star but visible to the naked eye with an apparent visual magnitude of 5.34. The annual parallax shift of 10.93 mas as seen from Earth yields a distance estimate of 318 light-years (97 pc) from the Sun. It is moving further away with a radial velocity of +22 km/s. Due to its proximity to the ecliptic, it is subject to lunar occultations.

A stellar classification of K3 III for Eta Cancri indicates that, at the estimated age of 3.9 billion years old, it has left the main sequence and become an evolved giant star. The spectrum shows unusually strong absorption lines of cyanogen. It has 1.5 times the mass of the Sun and has expanded to 17 times the Sun's radius. The star is radiating 87 times the Sun's luminosity from its photosphere at an effective temperature of around 4,415 K.

In Chinese astronomy, Ghost (Chinese: 鬼宿; pinyin: Guǐ Xiù) refers to an asterism consisting of Theta Cancri, Eta Cancri, Gamma Cancri and Delta Cancri. Eta Cancri itself is the second star of Ghost (Chinese: 鬼宿二; pinyin: Guǐ Xiù èr), following the designation from its determinative star (θ Cnc) from east to west.
