= Shashank =

Indian given name

- Gender: Male
- Language: Sanskrit

Origin
- Origin: Sanskrit
- Meaning: "Hare-marked" (referring to the Moon)
- Region of origin: Indian subcontinent

Other names
- Alternative spelling: Shashanka, Sasanka, Śaśāṅka
- Related names: Chandra, Soma, Indu
- A poetic epithet of the Moon in classical Sanskrit literature

Shashank (also spelled Shashanka, Sasanka, or Śaśāṅka, Sanskrit: शशाङ्क) is a masculine given name of Sanskrit origin, widely used in the Indian subcontinent. Beyond its use as a personal name, Shashank functions as a poetic and mythological epithet of the Moon in Hindu religious and literary traditions.

The name derives from the Sanskrit words śaśa (शश, 'hare') and aṅka (अङ्क, 'mark' or 'spot'), reflecting the ancient Indian belief that the Moon bears the image of a hare.

== Etymology and mythological significance ==
In Hindu cosmology and literature, Shashank refers to the Moon as “the one marked by a hare”. The association appears in Vedic hymns, epic poetry, and Shaiva theological texts. The deity Shiva is often depicted with a crescent moon on his matted locks, earning him the epithet Shashankashekhara (शशाङ्कशेखर), or 'He who wears the Moon (Shashank) as a crest'.

== Scriptural references ==
Scriptural references include:

- Rigveda 10.85.4: चन्द्रं हि प्रथमजा ऋतावरी दधाति शशाङ्कं वसुधां प्रवाहम्। ('She, born of cosmic order, sets Shashank in motion across the earth').
- Rigveda 10.85.18: अपश्यदस्य शशाङ्कस्य नीलोत्पलध्वजस्य च। ('He beheld Shashank, bannered with the blue lotus').
- Atharvaveda 10.2.31: शशाङ्को देवदेवानां दिवः पतिः पृथिव्याः पतिः। ('Shashank, lord of the gods, ruler of heaven and earth'.)
- Mahābhārata, Vana Parva 42.8: नीलोत्पलध्वजः शशाङ्कः शितेन्दुः पुण्यशालिनः। ('Shashank, bearer of the blue lotus emblem, radiant and auspicious'.”
- Rāmāyaṇa, Sundarakāṇḍa 15.28: सीता चन्द्रप्रभा यथा शशाङ्कं शोभयत्यपि। ('Sītā, radiant as moonlight, surpasses even Shashank in brilliance'.)
- Śiva Purāṇa: शशाङ्कशेखरं देवं शूलपाणिं त्रिलोचनम्। ('To the god adorned with Shashank on his head, wielder of the trident and three-eyed').

== Cultural and symbolic dimensions ==
In Jyotisha (Hindu astrology), the Moon governs emotions, the mind, and maternal qualities.

In classical Sanskrit literature, Shashank evokes serenity, beauty, and romantic imagery.

In Tantric and Kundalini yogic traditions, Shashank symbolizes meditative and cooling energy.

In Shaiva theology, the crescent moon worn by Shiva represents the cyclical nature of time and the regulation of cosmic rhythms. Shashank thus becomes a symbol of divine control over time, transformation, and inner consciousness.

== People with the name ==
- Shashanka, 7th-century ruler of Gauda (Bengal)
- Shashank (actor) (born 1979), Indian Telugu actor
- Shashank (diplomat) (born 1944), Indian ambassador and former foreign secretary
- Shashank (director) (born 1972), Indian Kannada-language film director, screenwriter and lyricist
- Shashank Arora (born 1989), Indian actor, musician and writer
- Shashanka Ghosh (fl. from 1990s), Indian film director and screenwriter
- Shashank Khaitan (born 1982), Indian film director and screenwriter
- Shashanka Koirala (born 1958), Nepali ophthalmologist and politician
- Shashank Manohar (born 1957), Indian lawyer and cricket administrator
- Shashank Shende (fl. from 2001), Indian actor, screenwriter, director and producer
- Shashank Singh (born 1991), Indian cricketer
- Shashank Subramanyam (born 1978), Indian flautist
- Shashank Vyas (born 1986), Indian actor

== See also ==
- Chandra, Hindu Moon god
- Hindu astrology
- Shoshenq, Ancient Egyptian royal name with similar phonetic sound
- Shawshank State Prison, a fictional location from The Shawshank Redemption
