= Mrigashira =

5th lunar mansion in Hindu astronomy

Mṛgaśirā (also spelled Mr̥gaśīrṣa; Devanagari: मृगशीर्ष) is the 5th nakṣatra or lunar mansion as used in Hindu astronomy and astrology, in the constellation Orion. It corresponds to the stars λ, φ^{1}, and φ^{2} Orionis. Its position is described in the Surya Siddhānta.

The asterism's names in various languages are:

- Telugu: మృగశిర
- Tamil: மிருகசீரிடம்
- Sinhalese: මුවසිරස
- Kannada: ಮೃಗಶಿರ
- Malayalam: മകയിരം

The first two pada (quarters) of this nakṣatra are part of Vṛṣabha Rāśi (Devanagari: वृषभ), which is Taurus. The latter two pada of this star belong to Mithuna Rāśi (Devanagari: मिथुन), which is Gemini (from 23°20’ Taurus to 6°40’ Gemini).

== Etymology ==
The term Mṛgaśira (मृगशिर) means "the deer's head"; it is a composite of two Sanskrit words, mṛga (मृग) meaning deer and śiras (शिर) meaning head or precisely, the top of the head.

The names Mṛgaśira (मृगशिर) and Mārgaśīrṣa/Mṛgaśīrṣa (मार्गशीर्ष) are sometimes used interchangeably. Grammatically, Mārgaśīrṣa (मार्गशीर्ष) means "of Mṛgaśira" or "related to Mṛgaśira". Thus Mṛgaśira (मृगशिर) is the correct name of the asterism, while Mārgaśīrṣa (मार्गशीर्ष) is the name of the month related to Mṛgaśira, i.e., the month in which the Moon is in conjunction with the Mṛgaśira nakṣatra. In Malayalam it is called Makayeeram.

== Naming principles ==
Under the traditional Hindu principle of naming individuals according to their nakṣatras, the following Sanskrit syllables correspond with this nakṣatra, and would belong at the beginning of a first name:

- Ve (Devanagari: वे)
- Vo (Devanagari: वो)
- Ka (Devanagari: क)
- Ki (Devanagari: कि)

Mṛgaśira nakṣatra extends from after 23°20' in Vṛṣabha Rāśi up to 6°40' in Mithuna. This Star is ruled by Mangala and the presiding deity is Chandra, the Moon God. He holds Amrita (nectar of immortality) and his mount is a chariot drawn by horses. He rules the following parts of the human body: the face, chin, cheeks, larynx, palate, throat, vocal chord, arms, shoulders, thymus gland, upper ribs.

The word mṛga represents forests, gardens, a search, a seeking to find, to roam about in forests and a hunter, to seek to blaze the trail, a guide and preceptor. Mṛgaśirṣa is partly in Vṛṣabha and partly in Mithuna. It conveys the ideas of searching for beautiful faces, visit or request a girl in marriage. People born in this nakṣatra have a strong body and moderate complexion.

== See also ==
- List of Nakshatras
