= Punarvasu =

7th lunar mansion in Hindu astrology

Gemini (constellation) map showing Castor and Pollux stars, a.k.a. Punarvasu

Punarvasu, meaning "the twin restorers of goods", is the 7th nakshatra (lunar mansion) in Indian astronomy. It corresponds to the two brightest stars in the constellation of Gemini, Castor and Pollux, plus two fainter stars, possibly ε and ζ Geminorum.

== Astrology ==
Punarvasu extends from 20 degrees 00 minutes of Mithun (Gemini) to 03 degrees 20 minutes of Karka (Cancer).

=== Astrological significance ===
In Hindu astrology, Punarvasu is ruled by Jupiter (Guru) and symbolized by a quiver of arrows, signifying renewal, restoration, and return. Its presiding deity is Aditi, the mother of the gods, representing nurturing, abundance, and universal support. This nakshatra is associated with optimism, resilience, and the ability to recover from adversity.

== Ramayana ==
Punarvasu is the birth nakshatra of Lord Rama:

“On completion of the ritual, six seasons have passed by and then in the twelfth month, on the ninth day of Chaitra month [April–May,] when the presiding deity of ruling star of the day is Aditi, where the ruling star of day is Punarvasu (Nakshatra), the asterism is in the ascendant, and when five of the nine planets viz., Sun, Mars, Jupiter, Saturn, and Venus are at their highest position, when Jupiter with Moon is ascendant in Cancer, and when day is advancing, then Queen Kausalya gave birth to a son with all the divine attributes like lotus-red eyes, lengthy arms, roseate lips, voice like drumbeat, and who took birth to delight the Ikshwaku dynasty, who is adored by all the worlds, and who is the greatly blessed epitome of Vishnu, namely Rama.”
- Book I : Bala Kanda, Ramayana by Valmiki, Chapter (Sarga) 18, Verse 8, 9, 10 and 11

The word Punarvasu is derived from Puna+ Vasu, which means return, renewal, restoration or repetition. The 12 Adityas were born of Kashyapa in the womb of Aditi. The 12 Adityas are Indra, Vaga, Vayu, Twasta, Varuna, Aryama, Pusa, Mitra, Agni, Parjyanya, Vivaswan and Dinakar. The mother Aditi of whom the Gods are born is the repository of everything good-truth, generosity, magnanimity, purity, aristocracy, beauty and renown. It follows that this star is the cause for these virtues. To start afresh after having once broken off, to start a new life, to come back from a distant land-all. Punarvasu signifies these. It stands for freedom from restriction and limitation, and boundless space.

== Naming convention ==
By the traditional Hindu principle of naming babies according to their Ascendant/Lagna nakshatra, the first names should start with the following Sanskrit letters for those who are born under the Nakshatra: Punarvasu or Punarpoosam.

- Ke (pronounced as in "Kesari")
- Ko (pronounced as in "Kopperuncholan")
- Ha (pronounced as in Ha-ra) for example Harika, Harini, Harshitha, Harish, Haritha, etc.
- Hi (pronounced as in "Hiranyakashipu")

== See also ==
- List of Nakshatras
