= 2001 YB5 =

Near-Earth asteroid

2001 YB_{5}
Designations
- Minor planet category: Apollo; NEO; PHA

Orbital characteristics
- Epoch 21 November 2025 (JD 2461000.5)
- Uncertainty parameter 7
- Aphelion: 4.36243 AU (652.610 Gm)
- Perihelion: 0.318856 AU (47.7002 Gm)
- Semi-major axis: 2.340642 AU (350.1551 Gm)
- Eccentricity: 0.863774
- Orbital period (sidereal): 3.58 yr (1308 d)
- Mean anomaly: 226.183°
- Mean motion: 0° 16^{m} 30.842^{s} / day
- Inclination: 5.55131°
- Longitude of ascending node: 108.212°
- Argument of perihelion: 115.487°
- Earth MOID: 0.0029099 AU (435,310 km)
- Jupiter MOID: 0.698308 AU (104.4654 Gm)

Physical characteristics
- Synodic rotation period: 2.5 h (0.10 d)
- Absolute magnitude (H): 20.74

2001 YB_{5} is a sub-kilometer B-type near-Earth asteroid that belongs to the Apollo group. It is also a potentially hazardous asteroid. The asteroid measures approximately 300 meters in diameter. It has a Minimum Orbit Intersection Distance (MOID) from the Earth of 0.0038 AU (570,000 km; 350,000 mi). Based on limited observations, the asteroid may have a rotation period of 2.5 hours.

It passed at a nominal distance of 0.0043767 AU (654,750 km; 406,840 mi) from the Moon and 0.0055633 AU (832,260 km; 517,140 mi) from Earth on 7 January 2002.

== Discovery ==
The asteroid was small enough to only be discovered after a close flyby on 26 December 2001 by NASA's Near-Earth Asteroid Tracking program (NEAT).

The asteroid came within 830,000 kilometres from Earth – approximately twice the distance to the Moon – on 7 January. Similarly close flybys from other 2001 YB_{5}-sized asteroids happen about once per year, and one impacts Earth about once every 20,000 to 30,000 years.
