= Svati =

15th lunar mansion in Hindu astronomy

Svati (Sanskrit: स्वाति, romanized: svāti) is a feminine Hindu name that is a compound of su + ati ('great goer', in reference to its remoteness) meaning 'very beneficent'. It was the name of one of the wives of the Moon in Hindu epics and the Sanskrit name of Arcturus as well as of the nakshatra (lunar mansion) associated with Arcturus in Hindu astrology. Probably referring to its brightness, it is called "the real pearl" in Bhartṛhari's kāvyas.

Svati (also Malayendu's Svati, Anila) is the 15th of the 27 nakshatras, and corresponds to Arcturus along with two other, fainter stars, identified as ζ and η Boötis.

== See also ==
- Hindu calendar
- List of Nakshatras
