= Theta Cancri =

Star system in the constellation Cancer

- Location of θ Cancri (circled)

Observation data Epoch J2000.0 Equinox J2000.0 (ICRS)
- Constellation: Cancer
- Right ascension: 08^{h} 31^{m} 35.730^{s}
- Declination: +18° 05′ 39.91″
- Apparent magnitude (V): +5.323

Characteristics
- Evolutionary stage: red giant branch
- Spectral type: K5 III
- U−B color index: +1.949
- B−V color index: +1.565

Astrometry
Radial velocity (R_{v})	+44.47±0.19 km/s
Proper motion (μ)	RA: −59.639 mas/yr Dec.: −56.615 mas/yr
Parallax (π)	7.5577±0.1008 mas
Distance	432 ± 6 ly (132 ± 2 pc)
Absolute magnitude (M_{V})	−0.19

Details
Mass	1.3 M_{☉}
Radius	67 R_{☉}
Luminosity	949 L_{☉}
Surface gravity (log g)	1.82 cgs
Temperature	3,998 K
Metallicity [Fe/H]	−0.19 dex

Other designations
- θ Cnc, 31 Cancri, BD+18°1963, FK5 2667, HD 72094, HIP 41822, HR 3357, SAO 97881

Database references
SIMBAD	data

Theta Cancri, is a binary star system in the zodiac constellation of Cancer. Its name is a Bayer designation that is Latinised from θ Cancri, and abbreviated Theta Cnc or θ Cnc. This star is visible to the naked eye as a dim point of light with an apparent visual magnitude of +5.32. The system is located at a distance of approximately 432 light-years (132 pc) from the Sun, based on parallax, and is drifting further away with a radial velocity of +44 km/s. Since it is near the ecliptic, it can be occulted by the Moon and, very rarely, by planets.

The primary, designated component A, is K-type giant star with a stellar classification of K5 III, having exhausted the supply of hydrogen at its core, then cooled and expanded. At present it has 67 times the girth of the Sun. It is radiating 949 times the luminosity of the Sun at an effective temperature of 3,998 K.

In Chinese astronomy, Ghost (Chinese: 鬼宿; pinyin: Guǐ Xiù) refers to an asterism consisting of Theta Cancri, Eta Cancri, Gamma Cancri and Delta Cancri. Theta Cancri is the first star of Ghost (Chinese: 鬼宿一; pinyin: Guǐ Xiù yī), as it is also the determinative star for that asterism.
