= Gamma Cancri =

Star system in the constellation Cancer

γ Cancri
- Location of γ Cancri (circled)

Observation data Epoch J2000.0 Equinox J2000.0 (ICRS)
- Constellation: Cancer
- Right ascension: 08^{h} 43^{m} 17.147^{s}
- Declination: +21° 28′ 06.60″
- Apparent magnitude (V): 4.673

Characteristics
- Evolutionary stage: main sequence
- Spectral type: A1IV
- U−B color index: +0.03
- B−V color index: +0.010

Astrometry
Radial velocity (R_{v})	28.7 km/s
Proper motion (μ)	RA: −105.760 mas/yr Dec.: −39.157 mas/yr
Parallax (π)	18.6431±0.1900 mas
Distance	175 ± 2 ly (53.6 ± 0.5 pc)
Absolute magnitude (M_{V})	+1.1

Details
Mass	2.35±0.42 M_{☉}
Radius	2.53±0.23 R_{☉}
Luminosity	43.3±7.9 L_{☉}
Surface gravity (log g)	4.00±0.25 cgs
Temperature	9,311 K
Rotational velocity (v sin i)	86±6 km/s
Age	171 Myr

Other designations
- Asellus Borealis, γ Cnc, Gamma Cnc, 43 Cnc, BD+21°1895, FK5 1228, GC 11982, HD 74198, HIP 42806, HR 3449, SAO 80378, CCDM 08433+2128

Database references
SIMBAD	data

Gamma Cancri is a star in the northern constellation of Cancer. Its name is a Bayer designation that is Latinized from γ Cancri, and abbreviated Gamma Cnc or γ Cnc. This star is formally named Asellus Borealis, pronounced /əˈsɛləs bɒriˈælɪs/, the traditional name of the system. Based on parallax measurements, it is located at a distance of approximately 175 light-years (54 pc) from the Sun. The star is drifting further away with a radial velocity of 29 km/s.

In 1910 this star was reported to be a spectroscopic binary by O. J. Lee, but is now considered a single star. Since it is near the ecliptic, it can be occulted by the Moon.

== Nomenclature ==
γ Cancri (Latinised to Gamma Cancri) is the star's Bayer designation. It bore the traditional name Asellus Borealis (Latin for "northern donkey"). In 2016, the International Astronomical Union organized a Working Group on Star Names (WGSN) to catalogue and standardize proper names for stars. The WGSN decided to attribute proper names to individual stars rather than entire multiple systems. It approved the name Asellus Borealis for the star on 6 November 2016 and it is now so included in the List of IAU-approved Star Names. Together with Delta Cancri, it formed the Aselli, flanking Praesepe.

In Chinese astronomy, Ghost (Chinese: 鬼宿; pinyin: Guǐ Xiù) refers to an asterism consisting of Theta Cancri, Eta Cancri, Gamma Cancri and Delta Cancri. Gamma Cancri itself is known as the third star of Ghost (Chinese: 鬼宿三; pinyin: Guǐ Xiù sān).

== Properties ==
Gamma Cancri presents as a white A-type subgiant with an apparent magnitude of +4.67. The star is an estimated 171 million years old and is spinning with a projected rotational velocity of 86 km/s. It has 2.35 times the mass of the Sun, 2.53 times the Sun's radius, and shines with a luminosity approximately 43 times greater at an effective temperature of 9,311 K.

It has been included as a member of the Hyades Stream based on its distance, space motion, and estimated age.
