= Delta Cancri =

Orange giant star in the constellation Cancer

δ Cancri
- Location of δ Cancri (circled)

Observation data Epoch J2000.0 Equinox ICRS
- Constellation: Cancer
- Right ascension: 08^{h} 44^{m} 41.099^{s}
- Declination: +18° 09′ 15.51″
- Apparent magnitude (V): +3.94

Characteristics
- Evolutionary stage: red clump
- Spectral type: K0 III
- U−B color index: +0.99
- B−V color index: +1.08

Astrometry
Radial velocity (R_{v})	16.39±0.25 km/s
Proper motion (μ)	RA: −18.435 mas/yr Dec.: −227.813 mas/yr
Parallax (π)	23.8271±0.1853 mas
Distance	137 ± 1 ly (42.0 ± 0.3 pc)
Absolute magnitude (M_{V})	+0.843

Details
Mass	1.71 M_{☉}
Radius	11.7±0.13 R_{☉}
Luminosity	59.5±1.4 L_{☉}
Surface gravity (log g)	2.59 cgs
Temperature	4,684±27 K
Metallicity [Fe/H]	−0.03 dex
Rotational velocity (v sin i)	2.8 km/s
Age	2.45 Gyr

Other designations
- Asellus Australis, δ Cnc, 47 Cnc, BD+18°2027, FK5 326, GC 12022, HD 74442, HIP 42911, HR 3461, SAO 98087, ADS 6967, CCDM 08447+1809

Database references
SIMBAD	data

Delta Cancri is a star in the constellation of Cancer. It has the proper name Asellus Australis, Delta Cancri is its Bayer designation. This star is visible to the naked eye with an apparent visual magnitude of +3.94. Based on parallax measurements, it is located at a distance of 137 light-years (42 pc) from Earth. It is drifting further away with a line of sight velocity of 16 km/s.

The star is 0.08 degree north of the ecliptic, so it can be occulted by the Moon and more rarely by planets; it is occulted (eclipsed) by the sun from about 31 July to 2 August. Thus the star can be viewed the whole night, crossing the sky at the start of February.

== Properties ==
The spectrum of this star matches a spectral class of K0 III, with the luminosity class III indicating that it is a giant star that has exhausted the hydrogen at its core. With an estimated age of 2.45 billion years and 1.71 times the mass of the Sun, this star has expanded to 11.7 times the Sun's radius. It is radiating 60 times the luminosity of the Sun from its enlarged photosphere at an effective temperature of 4,684 K. The temperature gives it the orange hue typical of K-type stars.

This star has an optical companion, named Delta Cancri B. This companion appears close to Delta Cancri A along the line of sight, in reality, it is much farther away than Delta Cancri A and has a different proper motion.

Component A was believed to be itself a binary star system whose components are Delta Cancri Aa and Ab. This companion would be separated by roughly 0.1" and be 0.96 magnitudes fainter. However, subsequent observations and modern studies suggest the companion does not exist.

== Nomenclature ==
Delta Cancri is the star's Bayer designation. This designation is Latinized from δ Cancri, and abbreviated Delta Cnc or δ Cnc.

It bore the traditional name Asellus Australis which is Latin for "southern donkey colt". In 2016, the International Astronomical Union organized a Working Group on Star Names (WGSN) to catalogue and standardize proper names for stars. The WGSN decided to attribute proper names to individual stars rather than entire multiple systems. It approved the name Asellus Australis for the component Delta Cancri Aa on 6 November 2016 and it is now so included in the List of IAU-approved Star Names. Together with Gamma Cancri, it formed the Aselli, flanking Praesepe.

As Arkū-sha-nangaru-sha-shūtu, which means "the southeast star in the Crab", it marked the 13th ecliptic station of the ancient Babylonians.

In Chinese astronomy, Ghost (Chinese: 鬼宿; pinyin: Guǐ Xiù) refers to an asterism consisting of Theta Cancri, Eta Cancri, Gamma Cancri and Delta Cancri. Delta Cancri itself is known as the fourth star of Ghost (Chinese: 鬼宿四; pinyin: Guǐ Xiù sì).

== Observations ==
Delta Cancri was involved in the first recorded occultation by Jupiter:

"The most ancient observation of Jupiter which we are acquainted with is that reported by Ptolemy in book X, chap. iii (sic), of the Almagest, ...when the planet eclipsed the star known as (Delta) Cancri. This observation was made on September 3, B.C. 240, about 18h on the meridian of Alexandria."

— Allen, 1898, quoting from Hind's The Solar System).

Delta Cancri also marks the famous open star cluster Praesepe (or the Beehive Cluster, also known as Messier 44). In ancient times M44 was used as a weather gauge as the following Greek rhyme from Aratos' Prognostica reveals:

A murky manger with both stars

Shining unaltered is a sign of rain.

While if the northern Ass is dimmed

By vaporous shroud, he of the south gleam radiant,

Expect a south wind: the vaporous shroud and radiance

Exchanging stars harbinger Boreas.

— Allen, 1898

The meaning of this verse is that if Asellus Borealis or Gamma Cancri is hidden by clouds, the wind will be from the south and that situation will be reversed if Asellus Australis is obscured. There is some doubt however as to the accuracy of this as Allen notes: "Our modern Weather Bureau would probably tell us that if one of these stars were thus concealed, the other also would be." (Allen, 1898)

But Delta Cancri also acts as more than just a dubious weather guide: it is a reliable signpost for finding the vividly red star X Cancri as Patrick Moore notes in his guidebook Stars of the Southern Skies:

“In the same binocular field with Delta [Cancri] you will find one of the reddest stars in the sky: X Cancri. It is a semi-regular variable; at maximum it rises to magnitude 5 and it never falls below 7.3 so that it can always be seen with binoculars. It looks rather like a tiny glowing coal.”

— Page 146, Moore, 1994.

Delta Cancri also marks the radiant of the Delta Cancrids meteor shower.

In 1876, the possibility of Delta Cancri having a companion star was proposed.
