= Omega Hydrae =

Star in the constellation Hydra

- Location of ω Hydrae (circled in red)

Observation data Epoch J2000.0 Equinox J2000.0 (ICRS)
- Constellation: Hydra
- Right ascension: 09^{h} 05^{m} 58.36642^{s}
- Declination: +05° 05′ 32.3360″
- Apparent magnitude (V): 5.00

Characteristics
- Evolutionary stage: horizontal branch
- Spectral type: K2 II-III
- U−B color index: +1.22
- B−V color index: +1.22

Astrometry
Radial velocity (R_{v})	+24.3±0.8 km/s
Proper motion (μ)	RA: −19.58 mas/yr Dec.: −11.07 mas/yr
Parallax (π)	3.64±0.31 mas
Distance	900 ± 80 ly (270 ± 20 pc)
Absolute magnitude (M_{V})	−2.19

Details
Mass	4.32±0.37 M_{☉}
Radius	48.49±5.55 R_{☉}
Luminosity	944.3±178.3 L_{☉}
Surface gravity (log g)	1.74±0.12 cgs
Temperature	4,789 K
Metallicity [Fe/H]	−0.12±0.10 dex
Rotational velocity (v sin i)	2.3 km/s
Age	180±70 Myr

Other designations
- ω Hya, 18 Hydrae, BD+05°2116, HD 77996, HIP 44659, HR 3613, SAO 117420

Database references
SIMBAD	data

Omega Hydrae, Latinised from ω Hydrae, is a golden-hued star in the equatorial constellation of Hydra, located to the west-southwest of the brighter star Zeta Hydrae. Based upon an annual parallax shift of just 3.64 mas as seen from Earth, it is located roughly 900 light-years from the Sun. It is faintly visible to the naked eye with an apparent visual magnitude of 5.00.

This is an evolved K-type star with a stellar classification of K2 II-III, which indicates a spectrum showing traits intermediate between the giant and bright giant stages. It is most likely (98% chance) on the horizontal branch, indicating that the star is generating energy through the thermonuclear fusion of helium at its core. With 4.32 times the Sun's mass, it has expanded to around 48 times the radius of the Sun. Omega Hydrae is about 180 million years old and spinning with a leisurely projected rotational velocity of 2.3 km/s. The star is radiating roughly 944 times the solar luminosity from its photosphere at an effective temperature of 4,789 K.
