= Theta Hydrae =

Binary star system in the constellation Hydra

- Location of θ Hydrae (circled in red)

Observation data Epoch J2000.0 Equinox J2000.0 (ICRS)
- Constellation: Hydra
- Right ascension: 09^{h} 14^{m} 21.866^{s}
- Declination: +02° 18′ 51.64″
- Apparent magnitude (V): 3.888

Characteristics
- Spectral type: B9.5 V + DA 1.6
- U−B color index: −0.118
- B−V color index: −0.065

Astrometry
Radial velocity (R_{v})	−10.7±0.3 km/s
Proper motion (μ)	RA: +128.152 mas/yr Dec.: −327.709 mas/yr
Parallax (π)	28.4019±0.3682 mas
Distance	115 ± 1 ly (35.2 ± 0.5 pc)
Absolute magnitude (M_{V})	+0.92

Details

θ Hya A
Mass	2.52 M_{☉}
Luminosity	52 L_{☉}
Surface gravity (log g)	3.80±0.08 cgs
Temperature	10,099±145 K
Metallicity [Fe/H]	−0.42±0.09 dex
Rotational velocity (v sin i)	95 km/s

θ Hya B
Mass	0.68 or 1.21 M_{☉}
Temperature	30,700 K

Other designations
- θ Hya, 22 Hydrae, BD+02°2167, FK5 347, HD 79469, HIP 45336, HR 3665, SAO 117527

Database references
SIMBAD	data

Theta Hydrae, Latinized from θ Hydrae, is a binary star system in the constellation Hydra. It is visible to the naked eye with an apparent visual magnitude of 3.9. The star system has a high proper motion with an annual parallax shift of 28.4 mas, indicating a distance of about 115 light years. Theta Hydrae forms a double with a magnitude 9.9 star located at an angular separation of 29 arcseconds.

The primary component of this system is a B-type main sequence star with a stellar classification of B9.5 V. It is a candidate Lambda Boötis star, indicating it displays an underabundance of iron peak elements. However, it is also underabundant in oxygen, a characteristic not shared by other Lambda Boötis stars. Instead, it may be a peculiar B star.

An orbiting white dwarf companion was discovered in 1998 from its X-ray emission. This degenerate star must have evolved from a progenitor that was once more massive than the current primary. Burleigh and Barstow (1999) gave a mass estimate of 0.68 times the mass of the Sun, whereas Holberg et al. (2013) put it as high as 1.21 times the Sun's mass. The latter would put it beyond the theoretical upper limit for white dwarf remnants of typical single stars that did not undergo a merger or mass loss.
