= Willow (Chinese constellation) =

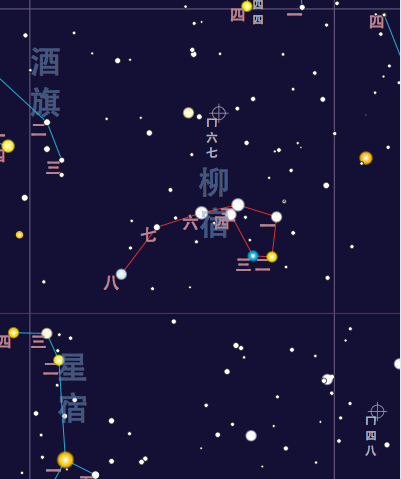
Liǔ Xiù map

The Willow mansion (柳宿, pinyin: Liǔ Xiù) is one of the Twenty-eight mansions of the Chinese constellations. It is one of the southern mansions of the Vermilion Bird.

== Asterisms ==
English name	Chinese name	European constellation	Number of stars
Willow	柳	Hydra	8
Banner of a Wine Shop	酒旗	Leo	3
