= List of largest stars =

The sizes of large stars, with the orbits of Earth and Jupiter for comparison

Below are lists of the largest stars currently known, ordered by radius and separated into categories by galaxy. The unit of measurement used is the radius of the Sun (approximately 695,700 km; 432,300 mi).

== Overview ==
Although red supergiants are often considered the largest stars, some other star types have been found to temporarily increase significantly in radius, such as during LBV eruptions or luminous red novae. Luminous red novae appear to expand extremely rapidly, reaching thousands to tens of thousands of solar radii within only a few months, significantly larger than the largest red supergiants.

Some studies use models that predict high-accreting Population III or Population I supermassive stars (SMSs) in the very early universe could have evolved "red supergiant protostars". These protostars are thought to have accretion rates larger than the rate of contraction, resulting in lower temperatures but with radii reaching up to many tens of thousands of R_{☉}, comparable to some of the largest known black holes.

=== Angular diameters ===
The angular diameters of stars can be measured directly using stellar interferometry. Other methods can use lunar occultations or from eclipsing binaries, which can be used to test indirect methods of finding stellar radii. Only a few supergiants can be occulted by the Moon, including Antares and 119 Tauri. Examples of eclipsing binaries are Epsilon Aurigae (Almaaz), VV Cephei, and V766 Centauri (HR 5171). Angular diameter measurements can be inconsistent because the boundary of the very tenuous atmosphere (opacity) differs depending on the wavelength of light in which the star is observed.

Uncertainties remain with the membership and order of the lists, especially when deriving various parameters used in calculations, such as stellar luminosity and effective temperature. Often stellar radii can only be expressed as an average or be within a large range of values. Values for stellar radii vary significantly in different sources and for different observation methods.

=== Radius limits ===
The current theoretical stellar evolutionary models place the largest possible normal and single red supergiants in our galaxy at approximately 1,500 R_{☉} (1×10^{9} km; 7 au; 0.6×10^{9} mi). This theoretical upper radius limit was based on the combination of Hayashi and modern Humphreys-Davidson limits, which place the coolest, most luminous, and hence initially most massive cool supergiants at roughly 3,500 K, 320,000 L_{☉}, and roughly 25–30 M_{☉} (or up to 32–40 M_{☉} assuming zero initial rotation) respectively, in which the former lies close to around M4. Supergiants exceeding those limits are expected to be catastrophically unstable, with cooler stars falling inside the Hayashi forbidden zone, where stars cannot be in hydrostatic equilibrium. As a result, stars violating these limits, such as being later than M4, were sometimes called into question and even sometimes classified as a different stellar type, such as smaller giant stars.

Like many other physical properties, the exact radius limit is expected to depend on metallicity. In these lists are some examples of distant extragalactic stars, such as notably red supergiants in the Magellanic Clouds, which are suspected to have slightly different properties and natures than the currently largest known stars in the Milky Way, including different limiting temperatures and luminosities. Low-metallicity stars are expected to be more compact, with both higher temperature and luminosity limits; the latter is due to lower mass-loss rates than their high-metallicity counterparts, including those in the Milky Way and Andromeda Galaxy. As such, those stars with an initial mass over 30 M_{☉} could evolve into cool supergiants, with 50 M_{☉} stars reaching up to 1,800 R_{☉} while maintaining hydrostatic equilibrium, while stars within young globular clusters and the early universe (with metallicity 0.02 times lower than the Sun's) with around 260 M_{☉} could reach as extreme as 5,000 R_{☉} as red supergiants. However, recent observations of extragalactic red supergiants in the Local Group show that most have luminosity estimates comparable to the most luminous known galactic red supergiants, suggesting the Humphreys-Davidson limit may not depend on stellar metallicity as previously thought.

Despite these limits, exceptions may exist among unusual and binary supergiants, such as VV Cephei-type stars and stars in unique evolutionary states. A small population of red supergiant stars within the Magellanic Clouds has been observed to have properties very unusual for their kind overall, including spectral variability of at least a type and unusually low temperatures, such as HV 11423 and WOH G64, and these may be indicative of an unstable and likely short-lived evolutionary phase. This unusual behavior challenges the current stellar evolutionary models and suggests that low-metallicity stars may exceed accepted limits by undergoing large eruptions or changing their spectral types over just a few months (or potentially years), due to the warmer limits of hydrostatic equilibrium. However, many luminous galactic dust-enshrouded red supergiants have also been observed with similar behaviour, including very high mass-loss phases, most notably VY Canis Majoris, and very late spectral types and significant spectral variability, such as VX Sagittarii, Westerlund 1 W26, and S Persei. Named as "S Per et al." after the latter, these stars are known as "extreme red supergiants" or "red hypergiants"; they are sometimes compared to less massive and unstable AGB and OH/IR stars due to their similarities, including in terms of maser activity. Those characteristics led several studies to suggest that these stars lie at or even beyond the Humphreys-Davidson and Hayashi limits, hence out of hydrostatic equilibrium in the Hayashi forbidden zone. As such, some of these stars may occasionally exceed the maximum radius limit, possibly due to strong pulsation, as demonstrated for VX Sagittarii.

The true explanation for the nature of these peculiar red supergiants currently remains unknown, but several scenarios have been proposed, such as the evolution towards cooler-than-expected temperatures of stars up to 40 M_{☉}, analogous to the brightest and most massive normal red supergiants, the last or brief stage of stars with an initial mass of 15–20 M_{☉} with higher-than-expected luminosities, the product of binary evolution, or a redward evolution from a post-red supergiant yellow hypergiant to a second and more extreme red supergiant phase. Although another explanation suggests underestimation of spectral types due to interference from dusty circumstellar nebulae, this has been shown to be not the case for NML Cygni, implying it may have remained no earlier than M6 and in a non-equilibrium state for decades.

=== Largest star ===
Examples of some of the largest red hypergiant stars with accurately measured radii.

In the late 20th century, various papers and studies measured occasionally extreme properties that suggested or implied very large radius values above 2,500 R_{☉} among a few late-type red supergiants, such as EV Carinae and AH Scorpii. Particularly, VY Canis Majoris and NML Cygni used to have estimates well above 3,000 R_{☉}, sometimes as extreme as over 4,000 R_{☉}.

In the early 21st century, both Mu Cephei and VV Cephei A were both described as the largest stars at 1,450–1,650 R_{☉} and 1,600–1,900 R_{☉} respectively, and as well as the largest of the four classical red supergiants, including Betelgeuse and Antares. A 2005 study led by Emily Levesque studied a sample of 74 galactic red supergiants, with four stars identified with the largest radii (i.e Mu Cephei, KY Cygni, KW Sagittarii, and V354 Cephei), all having comparable sizes of very roughly 1,500 R_{☉}, consistent with at least the largest possible radii for galactic red supergiants. However, the authors noted the possibility of exceeding the upper size limit due to binary interaction or a unique evolutionary state, as stated for VV Cephei A and VY Canis Majoris to explain their suggested larger radius values. Despite that, a follow-up paper by the same authors found a rather much lower radius of 600 R_{☉} for VY CMa, but it was ruled out by an almost immediate study led by different authors, publishing a size estimate of 1,800–2,100 R_{☉}. Later in 2008 and 2009, WOH G64, one of the very few extragalactic supergiants recognized for its extreme properties in excess of 2,000 R_{☉}, was precisely measured to be around 1,540–1,730 R_{☉}. Although consistent with the four largest galactic red supergiants found by the said 2005 study, its properties are still considered extreme per stellar evolutionary theory and for a red supergiant within the Large and Small Magellanic Clouds, which are typically found to be up to 1,200–1,300 R_{☉}. As such, it was considered to be potentially the largest known star, at least within the LMC.

Currently, sizes and distances of many red supergiants have been calculated more accurately, but often with somewhat lower estimates, such as 1,009 R_{☉} for KW Sagittarii. Many of those new values place the largest measured red supergiants or hypergiants at, very close to, or slightly above the commonly used upper size limit of 1,500 R_{☉}, most notably S Persei, VY Canis Majoris, VX Sagittarii, Westerlund 1 W26, and WOH G64 A. Some of these were hence described as the largest known stars, at least with well-determined (mean) estimates. Despite that, other red supergiants and extreme asymptotic giant branch stars with potentially larger radii (hence possible candidates) have been published once and in date, such as UY Scuti, MY Cephei, and Stephenson 2 DFK 1, although with still considerable variation.

== Caveats ==
Various issues exist in determining accurate radii of the largest stars, which in many cases do display significant errors. The following lists are generally based on various considerations or assumptions; these include:

- Stellar radii or diameters are usually derived only approximately using the Stefan–Boltzmann law for the deduced stellar luminosity and effective surface temperature.
- Stellar distances, and their errors, for most stars, remain uncertain or poorly determined.
- Many extended supergiant atmospheres also significantly change in size over time, regularly or irregularly pulsating over several months or years as variable stars. This makes adopted luminosities poorly known and may significantly change the quoted radii.
- Other direct methods for determining stellar radii rely on lunar occultations or from eclipses in binary systems. This is only possible for a very small number of stars.
- Many distance estimates for red supergiants come from stellar cluster or association membership, because it is difficult to calculate accurate distances for red supergiants that are not part of any cluster or association.
- In these lists are some examples of extremely distant extragalactic stars, which may have slightly different properties and natures than the currently largest known stars in the Milky Way. For example, some red supergiants in the Magellanic Clouds are suspected to have slightly different limiting temperatures and luminosities. Such stars may exceed accepted limits by undergoing large eruptions or changing their spectral types over just a few months (or potentially years).

== Lists ==
The following lists show the largest known stars based on the host galaxy.

=== Milky Way ===
List of the largest known stars in the Milky Way
Star name	Solar radius (R_{☉})	Method (Note: Methods for calculating the radius: AD: radius calculated from angular diameter and distance; L/T_{eff}: radius calculated from bolometric luminosity and effective temperature; SEIS: radius obtained from seismic data; OD: radius obtained from optical depth)	Notes
Orbit of Saturn	2,047–2,049.9 (Note: At the J2000 epoch)		Reported for reference
Stephenson 2 DFK 1 (St2-18)	1,840+310 −360	L/T_{eff}	Spectrum cannot accurately be reproduced by models at the distance to Stephenson 2, which may indicate that it is a foreground star considering that its radial velocity of 93.4±0.2 km s^{-1} deviates from that of the cluster, which is 109 km s^{-1}. However, decreasing the distance up to 4 kpc does not solve the issue, so the star is still considered to be a member of the cluster, with only spectra at the smallest beam being considered.
Theoretical limit of star size (Milky Way)	1,690+800 −610	L/T_{eff}	Estimated by measuring the fraction of red supergiants at higher luminosities in a large sample of supernova progenitor candidates. Valid for M3-type red supergiants. Reported for reference
NML Cygni	1,590±40	L/T_{eff}	Surrounding dusty region is very complex making the radius hard to determine.
V538 Carinae	1,503	L/T_{eff}	
RSGC1-F01	1,470 ± 230	L/T_{eff}	
VX Sagittarii	1,456±108 – 1,556±110	AD	Widely recognized as being among the largest known stars. The lower value is the mean radius during quiescent pulsation cycle, with an amplitude of 60 R_{☉}, while the higher value is the mean radius during the active pulsation cycle, with an amplitude of 197 R_{☉}. Reached a maximum radius of 1,798±127 R_{☉} in September 2019. During 2020 to 2021, the star underwent a great dimming event similar to Betelgeuse.
Stephenson 2 DFK 2 (St2-3)	1,420 ± 250	L/T_{eff}	
VY Canis Majoris	1,420±120	AD	An extreme oxygen-rich red hypergiant that has experienced two dimming periods in the 20th century, where the star became dimmer by up to 2.5 magnitudes. Potentially the largest known star. There is a possibility that this size might be a bit overestimated (on the order of 1 sigma). Hence, the quoted radius might be just an upper limit.
AH Scorpii	1,411±124	AD	Its angular diameter was re-measured at 5.05 ± 0.5 mas in 2023, which would yield a smaller radius of 1,227 R_{☉}.
CD–34°11794	1,409	L/T_{eff}	Oxygen-rich red supergiant and OH/IR star.
RSGC1-F06	1,380 ± 330	L/T_{eff}	
S Persei	1,364±6	AD	Oxygen-rich red supergiant. Also called a hypergiant.
HR 5171 (V766 Centauri A)	1,315±260 – 1,575±400	AD	V766 Centauri Aa is a rare variable yellow hypergiant.
RSGC1-F02	1,290 ± 210	L/T_{eff}	
HD 143183 (V558 Normae)	1,261	L/T_{eff}	
PZ Cassiopeiae	1,260 – 1,340	L/T_{eff}	
RSGC1-F10	1,250 ± 290	L/T_{eff}	
V354 Cephei	1,245	L/T_{eff}	
Westerlund 1 W237 (Westerlund 1 BKS B)	1,241±70	L/T_{eff}	
ST Cephei	1,218	L/T_{eff}	
IRC -30312	1,204	L/T_{eff}	
IRC -10414	~1,200	L/T_{eff}	
V517 Monocerotis	1,196+80 −159 – 1,208	L/T_{eff}	
RSGC1-F05	1,190 ± 280	L/T_{eff}	
GCIRS 7	1,170±60, 1,359, 1,368	AD & L/T_{eff}	
Westerlund 1 W26 (Westerlund 1 BKS AS)	1,165±58–1,221±120	L/T_{eff}	
[A72c] 16	1,157	L/T_{eff}	
WY Velorum A	1,157	L/T_{eff}	A symbiotic binary.
RSGC1-F08	1,150 ± 260	L/T_{eff}	
IRC -30303	1,147	L/T_{eff}	
RSGC1-F03	1,140 ± 180	L/T_{eff}	
Orbit of Jupiter	1,114.5–1,115.8		Reported for reference
V582 Cassiopeiae	1,111	L/T_{eff}	
RW Cephei	1,105+49 −46	AD	A K-type hypergiant star that experienced a "great dimming" event in 2022, similar to Betelgeuse.
RW Cygni	1,103+251 −177	AD	
RSGC1-F04	1,100 ± 180	L/T_{eff}	
RT Carinae	1,090	L/T_{eff}	
RSGC1-F13	1,080 ± 170	L/T_{eff}	
UU Persei	1,079+9 −8	L/T_{eff}	
LL Pegasi	1,070	L/T_{eff}	
HD 126577	1,066+9 −32	L/T_{eff}	
HaroChavira 1	1,058	L/T_{eff}	
EV Carinae	1,057	L/T_{eff}	Red supergiant. An older study suggests an extremely high radius of 2,877 R_{☉}.
CM Velorum	1,048 – 1,416.24+0.40 −0.96	L/T_{eff}	
AG Camelopardalis	1,048	L/T_{eff}	
SU Persei	1,044+31 −21 – 1,139+34 −23,	AD	
SW Cephei	1,035+75 −120	AD	
KY Cygni	1,032	L/T_{eff}	
BC Cygni	1,031 – 1,187+34 −37, 1,062	L/T_{eff}	A more detailed but older study gives values of 1,081 R_{☉} (856–1,375) for the year 2000, and 1,303 R_{☉} (1,021–1,553) for the year 1900.
RSGC1-F11	1,030 ± 230	L/T_{eff}	
Stephenson 2 DFK 3 (St2-4)	1,030 ± 190	L/T_{eff}	
MY Cephei	1,028 ± 169 – 1,138 ± 387 (Note: Luminosities are calculated using the apparent bolometric magnitude and distances in the following equation: 10^{0.4 • (4.74−(m_{bol}+5−5 • log(dist)))})	L/T_{eff}	
V346 Puppis	1,025	L/T_{eff}	
V530 Cassiopeiae	1,017	L/T_{eff}	
V602 Carinae	1,015	AD	
VV Cephei A	1,015	AD	A red supergiant star orbited by a smaller B-type main-sequence star with a radius estimated between 13 and 25 R_{☉}. Widely recognised as being among the largest known stars. Another estimate give a radius of 660 R_{☉} based on the Gaia DR3 distance of 1 kpc.
U Lacertae A	1,013	L/T_{eff}	
RSGC1-F07	1,010 ± 240	L/T_{eff}	
KW Sagittarii	1,009±142	AD	
Ve 4-64	1,007	L/T_{eff}	
V349 Carinae	1,002+12 −74	L/T_{eff}	
RSGC1-F09	1,000 ± 230	L/T_{eff}	
V674 Cephei	999	L/T_{eff}	
CZ Hydrae	990	L/T_{eff}	
IRAS 18111-2257	~990 – 1,180	L/T_{eff}	Estimated based on the bolometric luminosity (14,000–20,000 L_{☉}) and assumed effective temperature of 2,000 K. Another period-luminosity-derived luminosity for this star results in a radius of 1,730 R_{☉}.
CIT 11 (V3060 Cygni)	982	L/T_{eff}	
V381 Cephei Aa	977	L/T_{eff}	
MSX6C G086.5890–00.7718	(975+175 −183 – 1,035+186 −158) – 1,196.91+6.31 −6.35	L/T_{eff}	Lower values based on the Gaia DR3 effective temperature and the luminosity of Levesque et al. (2005) and that of Messineo & Brown (2019). Higher value based on the GSP Phot-Aeneas library using BR/RP spectra in Gaia DR3.
V3953 Sagittarii (IRC −30398)	970	L/T_{eff}	
V396 Centauri	965	L/T_{eff}	
UW Aquilae	964	L/T_{eff}	
RSGC1-F12	950 ± 230	L/T_{eff}	
V398 Cassiopeiae (HD 240275)	941	L/T_{eff}	
IRC +60342	940	L/T_{eff}	
ψ^{1} Aurigae	934 – 1,004+369 −234	L/T_{eff}	
GX Monocerotis	931	L/T_{eff}	
NR Vulpeculae	923+62 −50	AD	
V645 Cephei	920	L/T_{eff}	
S Cassiopeiae	920	L/T_{eff}	One of the coolest known stars, at an effective temperature of 1,800 K (1,500 °C).
NV Aurigae (IRC +50137)	918	L/T_{eff}	
UY Scuti	909	L/T_{eff}	Once thought to have a radius of 1,708±192 R_{☉}.
KU Andromedae (IRC +40004)	900 – 1,040	L/T_{eff}	
V1417 Aquilae	900	L/T_{eff}	
V774 Sagittarii	889	L/T_{eff}	
V923 Centauri	881	L/T_{eff}	
IRAS 20341+4047	880	L/T_{eff}	
IRAS 17418−2713	880	L/T_{eff}	
V540 Sagittarii	880	L/T_{eff}	
V386 Cephei	879	L/T_{eff}	
Trumpler 27-1 (CD–33°12241)	876+5 −12	?	
T Lyrae	880	L/T_{eff}	
TYC 3996-552-2	870	L/T_{eff}	
V1300 Aquilae (IRC −10529)	860 – 1,100	L/T_{eff}	
Westerlund 1 W20 (Westerlund 1 BKS D)	858±48	L/T_{eff}	
FX Serpentis	857	L/T_{eff}	
AZ Cygni	856+20 −14 – 927+21 −15	AD	Estimated based on data from the CHARA array. Other radii of 890+21 −15 R_{☉} (2014), 895+21 −15 R_{☉} (2015) and 890+21 −15 R_{☉} (2016) are calculated based on the same data.
V348 Velorum	855	L/T_{eff}	
BI Cygni	852+12 −9 – 908+12 −10	AD	
TW Carinae	835	L/T_{eff}	
V358 Cassiopeiae	835	L/T_{eff}	
VLH96 A	833	L/T_{eff}	
DO 26226	826	L/T_{eff}	
HD 155737	823	L/T_{eff}	
6 Geminorum	821	L/T_{eff}	
RW Leonis Minoris	820 – 1,000	L/T_{eff}	
HaroChavira 2	813	L/T_{eff}	
HD 300933	806	L/T_{eff}	
[W61c] R 53	801	L/T_{eff}	
RT Ophiuchi	801±217	AD	
HD 95687	797	L/T_{eff}	
BO Carinae	790±158	L/T_{eff}	
HD 62745	790	L/T_{eff}	
WX Piscium	790 – 1,000	L/T_{eff}	
VR5–7	775 ± 65	L/T_{eff}	
T Cancri	770	L/T_{eff}	
V Cygni	770	L/T_{eff}	
BD+63 3	770	L/T_{eff}	
CL Carinae	770	L/T_{eff}	
RS Persei	770±30, 775+110 −85	AD	
V355 Cephei	770±154 – 790	L/T_{eff}	
BD+63 270	769	L/T_{eff}	
V644 Cephei	765	L/T_{eff}	
Garnet Star (μ Cephei)	762	AD	Widely recognised as being among the largest known stars.
BM VIII 11	754	L/T_{eff}	
[SLN74] 2130	752	L/T_{eff}	
IRAS 10176-5802	751.2+0.4 −0.6 – (793+281 −152–849+172 −133)	L/T_{eff}	Lower value based on the GSP Phot-Aeneas library using BR/RP spectra in Gaia DR3. Higher values based on the Gaia DR3 effective temperature and the luminosity of Levesque et al. (2005) and that of Messineo & Brown (2019).
HD 303250	750±150	L/T_{eff}	
V384 Persei	750 – 940	L/T_{eff}	
V466 Persei	750	L/T_{eff}	
V Coronae Borealis	750	L/T_{eff}	
GY Aquilae	748 – 920	AD	
UU Pegasi	742±193	AD	
IM Cassiopeiae	740	L/T_{eff}	
GY Camelopardalis	740	L/T_{eff}	
R Andromedae	730	L/T_{eff}	
RSGC3-S3	730 ± 150	L/T_{eff}	
Stephenson 2 DFK 5 (St2-14)	740 ± 130	L/T_{eff}	
TT Centauri	740	L/T_{eff}	
Stephenson 2 DFK 10 (St2-5)	730	L/T_{eff}	
V1259 Orionis	730	L/T_{eff}	
RSGC3-S15	730 ± 140	L/T_{eff}	
VdBH 222#566	725	L/T_{eff}	May be larger at 912 R_{☉}, however this is unlikely due to the luminosity not matching with the H-R diagram where the temperature was calculated.
HD 105563 A	723	L/T_{eff}	
Westerlund 1 W75 (Westerlund 1 BKS E)	722±36	L/T_{eff}	
AI Volantis	720	L/T_{eff}	
V1111 Ophiuchi (IRC +10365)	720 – 900	L/T_{eff}	
XX Persei	718+80 −56	AD	
RX Telescopii	716	L/T_{eff}	
V Camelopardalis	716±185	AD	
CD–61°3575	716	L/T_{eff}	
S Cephei	715	L/T_{eff}	
AS Cephei	713	L/T_{eff}	
V770 Cassiopeiae (BD+60 299)	713	L/T_{eff}	
AZ Cephei	712	L/T_{eff}	
R Leporis (Hind's Crimson Star)	710 – 910	AD	
MZ Puppis	708	L/T_{eff}	
GP Cassiopeiae	707 – 771.74+0.23 −0.86	L/T_{eff}	
GCIRS 12N	703 ± 107	L/T_{eff}	
RU Herculis	700 ± 90	L/T_{eff}	
V528 Carinae	700±140	L/T_{eff}	
The following well-known stars are listed for the purpose of comparison.
Antares (α Scorpii A)	680	AD	Fourteenth brightest star in the night sky. Widely recognised as being among the largest known stars.
Betelgeuse (α Orionis)	640, 764+116 −62, 782 ± 55, 812	AD & SEIS	Tenth brightest star in the night sky. Widely recognised as being among the largest known stars, radius decreased to ~500 R_{☉} during the 2020 great dimming event.
ρ Cassiopeiae	634±24	AD	A yellow hypergiant star, similar to V382 Carinae, that is also visible to the naked eye.
R Horologii	630	L/T_{eff}	A red giant star with one of the largest ranges in brightness known of stars in the night sky visible to the unaided eye. Despite its large radius, it is less massive than the Sun.
V382 Carinae	616±69	AD	A yellow hypergiant, one of the rarest types of stars.
119 Tauri (CE Tauri, Ruby Star)	587 – 593	AD	
CW Leonis	560	L/T_{eff}	The nearest carbon star.
V838 Monocerotis	464	L/T_{eff}	During the 2002 Red Nova, the star's radius may have increased up to 3,190 R_{☉}.
V509 Cassiopeiae	433±17	AD	A variable yellow hypergiant whose size varied from around 680 R_{☉} in 1950–1970 to 910 R_{☉} in 1977, and later decreased to 390 R_{☉} in the 1990s.
Mira (ο Ceti A)	332–402	AD	Prototype of the Mira variables.
Orbit of Mars	322–323.1		Reported for reference
La Superba (Y Canum Venaticorum)	315	L/T_{eff}	
Pistol Star (V4647 Sagittarii)	308	L/T_{eff}	One of the most luminous stars known.
R Doradus	298 ± 21	AD	The extrasolar star with the largest apparent size.
Rasalgethi (α Herculis A)	284±60 (264–303)	L/T_{eff}	
Cygnus OB2#12	246	?	One of the most massive and luminous stars known.
Orbit of Earth (~1 AU)	214		Reported for reference
Suhail (λ Velorum)	211±6	AD	
Wezen (δ Canis Majoris)	188	L/T_{eff}	Thirty-sixth brightest star in the night sky.
Enif (ε Pegasi)	178	L/T_{eff}	
Orbit of Venus	158.6		Reported for reference
η Carinae A	128 – 742	OD	During the 1843 Great Eruption, the star's radius may have increased up to 4,319–6,032 R_{☉}.
Deneb (α Cygni)	107 (Note: Calculated using a distance of 432 parsecs and an angular diameter of 2.31 milliarcseconds.) – 203±17	AD & ?	Eighteenth brightest star in the night sky.
Orbit of Mercury	82.9–84.6		Reported for reference
Rigel (β Orionis A)	74.1+6.1 −7.3	AD	Seventh brightest star in the night sky.
Canopus (α Carinae)	73.3	AD	Second brightest star in the night sky.
Gacrux (γ Crucis)	73	L/T_{eff}	Twenty-sixth brightest star in the night sky.
Polaris (α Ursae Minoris Aa)	46.27±0.42	AD	The current star in the North Pole. It is a Classical Cepheid variable, and the brightest example of its class.
Aldebaran (α Tauri A)	45.1±0.1	AD	Fourteenth brightest star in the night sky.
Arcturus (α Boötis)	25.4 ± 0.2	AD	This is the nearest red giant to the Earth, and the fourth brightest star in the night sky.
Pollux (β Geminorum)	9.06 ± 0.03	AD	The nearest giant star to the Earth.
Spica (α Virginis A)	7.47±0.54		One of the nearest supernova candidates and the sixteenth-brightest star in the night sky.
Regulus (α Leonis A)	4.16 × 3.14		The nearest B-type star to the Earth.
Vega (α Lyrae)	2.726±0.006 × 2.418±0.012	AD	Fifth brightest star in the night sky.
Altair (α Aquilae)	2.01 × 1.57		Twelfth brightest star in the night sky.
Sirius (α Canis Majoris A)	1.713	AD	The brightest star in the night sky.
Rigil Kentaurus (α Centauri A)	1.2175	AD	Third brightest star in the night sky.
Sun	1		The largest object in the Solar System.

=== Magellanic Clouds ===
List of the largest known stars in the Magellanic Clouds
Star name	Solar radius (R_{☉})	Galaxy	Method	Notes
Theoretical limit of star size (Large Magellanic Cloud)	≳1,550		L/T_{eff}	Estimated by measuring the fraction of red supergiants at higher luminosities in a large sample of stars. Assumes an effective temperature of 3,545 K. Reported for reference
WOH G64 A	1,540 ± 77	Large Magellanic Cloud	L/T_{eff}	Once thought to have become a smaller yellow hypergiant, due to its transition from semi-regular to irregular variability in 2014. Recent data show it remains a red supergiant, affected by a companion star. Possibly the largest known star.
MSX LMC 839	1,526	Large Magellanic Cloud	L/T_{eff}	
HV 888 (WOH S140)	1,509	Large Magellanic Cloud	L/T_{eff}	
W60 A27	1,444–1,665	Large Magellanic Cloud	L/T_{eff}	
HD 269551	1,439	Large Magellanic Cloud	L/T_{eff}	
HV 12463	1,420	Large Magellanic Cloud	L/T_{eff}	
IRAS 05280–6910 (NGC 1984-IRS1)	1,367	Large Magellanic Cloud	L/T_{eff}	The most reddened object in the Large Magellanic Cloud.
OGLE BRIGHT-LMC-LPV-52	1,275–1,384	Large Magellanic Cloud		
IRAS 05346-6949	1,211	Large Magellanic Cloud	L/T_{eff}	It has an estimated mass-loss rate of 0.0017 M_{☉} (566 Earths) per year, the highest for any star.
W60 B90 (WOH S264)	1,210	Large Magellanic Cloud	L/T_{eff}	Has an unusually high metallicity and velocity.
IRAS 04509–6922	1,187 - 1,339	Large Magellanic Cloud	L/T_{eff}	
HV 5618	1,163	Large Magellanic Cloud	L/T_{eff}	
HV 2242	1,160 – 1,180	Large Magellanic Cloud	L/T_{eff}	
LMC 25320	1,156	Large Magellanic Cloud	L/T_{eff}	
SMC 18592	1,129	Small Magellanic Cloud	L/T_{eff}	
MSX SMC 018	1,119	Small Magellanic Cloud	L/T_{eff}	
LMC252	1,117–1,164	Large Magellanic Cloud		
LMC045	1,112	Large Magellanic Cloud	L/T_{eff}	
SP77 21-12	1,103	Large Magellanic Cloud	L/T_{eff}	
MSX LMC 810	1,104	Large Magellanic Cloud	L/T_{eff}	
WOH S338	1,100	Large Magellanic Cloud	L/T_{eff}	
LMC 136042	1,092	Large Magellanic Cloud	L/T_{eff}	
LMC 175188	1,090–1,317	Large Magellanic Cloud		
WOH S274	1,071	Large Magellanic Cloud	L/T_{eff}	
W60 D44	1,063	Large Magellanic Cloud	L/T_{eff}	
HV 12233	1,057	Large Magellanic Cloud	L/T_{eff}	
MSX LMC 589	1,051	Large Magellanic Cloud	L/T_{eff}	
Theoretical limit of star size (Small Magellanic Cloud)	≳1,050		L/T_{eff}	Estimated by measuring the fraction of red supergiants at higher luminosities in a large sample of stars. Assumes an effective temperature of 3,850 K. Reported for reference
MSX LMC 947	1,050	Large Magellanic Cloud	L/T_{eff}	
LMC 144217	1,039	Large Magellanic Cloud		
SP77 31-18	1,038	Large Magellanic Cloud	L/T_{eff}	
IRAS 05402-6956	1,032	Large Magellanic Cloud	L/T_{eff}	
HV 2255	1,027–1,236	Large Magellanic Cloud		
TRM 36	1,019	Large Magellanic Cloud	L/T_{eff}	
Sk -69 148	1,006	Large Magellanic Cloud	L/T_{eff}	A yellow hypergiant.
LMC 175549	1,005	Large Magellanic Cloud	L/T_{eff}	
HV 2450	1,000+2 −1–1,071	Large Magellanic Cloud	L/T_{eff}	A yellow hypergiant.
LMC 149767	994	Large Magellanic Cloud	L/T_{eff}	
UCAC2 2674864 (HV 2834)	990+115 −100	Large Magellanic Cloud	L/T_{eff}	
HV 996	988–1,176	Large Magellanic Cloud		
W61 8–88	986	Large Magellanic Cloud	L/T_{eff}	
HV 2362	982 – 1,030	Large Magellanic Cloud	L/T_{eff}	
MG73 59	979	Large Magellanic Cloud	L/T_{eff}	A yellow supergiant.
HD 268757	979	Large Magellanic Cloud	L/T_{eff}	A G8 yellow hypergiant.
SMC 56389	976	Small Magellanic Cloud	L/T_{eff}	
LMC 136404	974	Large Magellanic Cloud	L/T_{eff}	
SP77 46-32	973–1,133	Large Magellanic Cloud		
HV 2084	967–1,083	Small Magellanic Cloud		
WOH S74	965–1,014	Large Magellanic Cloud	L/T_{eff}	
SMC 10889	963	Small Magellanic Cloud	L/T_{eff}	
TRM 67	951	Large Magellanic Cloud	L/T_{eff}	
LHA 120-S 26	951	Large Magellanic Cloud	L/T_{eff}	
LMC 139413	951	Large Magellanic Cloud	L/T_{eff}	
TRM 87	947	Large Magellanic Cloud	L/T_{eff}	
LMC 148035	947	Large Magellanic Cloud	L/T_{eff}	
HV 12802	946–1,377	Large Magellanic Cloud		
SMC 018136	945	Small Magellanic Cloud	L/T_{eff}	
LMC 142202	943	Large Magellanic Cloud	L/T_{eff}	
LMC 147199	939 – 990	Large Magellanic Cloud	L/T_{eff}	
SP77 37-24	936	Large Magellanic Cloud	L/T_{eff}	
LMC 148381	932	Large Magellanic Cloud	L/T_{eff}	
LMC 23095	926 – 1,280	Large Magellanic Cloud	L/T_{eff}	
SP77 31–16	923±28	Large Magellanic Cloud	L/T_{eff}	A yellow hypergiant.
LMC 170452	920	Large Magellanic Cloud	L/T_{eff}	
SP77 44-5	918	Large Magellanic Cloud	L/T_{eff}	
LMC 66778	915 – 990	Large Magellanic Cloud	L/T_{eff}	
NGC371 R20	913	Small Magellanic Cloud	L/T_{eff}	
LMC 150040	911	Large Magellanic Cloud	L/T_{eff}	
HV 2236	911–971	Large Magellanic Cloud	L/T_{eff}	
TRM 108	906	Large Magellanic Cloud	L/T_{eff}	
LMC 169142	902	Large Magellanic Cloud	L/T_{eff}	
WOH S457	902±45	Large Magellanic Cloud	L/T_{eff}	
IRAS 04498-6842 (LI-LMC 60)	898 – 1,137 – 1,765, 1,224	Large Magellanic Cloud	L/T_{eff}	Lower value derived from fitting models that assume the star's effective temperature to be 3,400 K. Higher value based on the measured effective temperature from van Loon et al. (2005). A newer paper estimates parameters that would result in a radius of 1,765 R_{☉}.
LMC 135720	898	Large Magellanic Cloud	L/T_{eff}	
SMC 81961	892	Small Magellanic Cloud	L/T_{eff}	
SP77 44-19	891–1,297	Large Magellanic Cloud	L/T_{eff}	
SP77 45–49	890	Large Magellanic Cloud	L/T_{eff}	
LMC 175464	892–982	Large Magellanic Cloud		
SMC 49478	888	Small Magellanic Cloud	L/T_{eff}	
HV 12185	890+55 −65	Large Magellanic Cloud	L/T_{eff}	
SP77 45–53	885–981	Large Magellanic Cloud		
LMC 170079	882	Large Magellanic Cloud	L/T_{eff}	
SMC 5092	880	Small Magellanic Cloud	L/T_{eff}	
HV 12793	880+45 −65	Large Magellanic Cloud	L/T_{eff}	
W61 21–22	877	Large Magellanic Cloud	L/T_{eff}	
SP77 35-1	877	Large Magellanic Cloud	L/T_{eff}	
UCAC3 43-23216	873	Large Magellanic Cloud	L/T_{eff}	
HV 11423	872	Small Magellanic Cloud	L/T_{eff}	
WOH S57	875+70 −60	Large Magellanic Cloud	L/T_{eff}	
SP77 53-3	870	Large Magellanic Cloud	L/T_{eff}	
SP77 36-14	870	Large Magellanic Cloud	L/T_{eff}	
SP77 31-19	870	Large Magellanic Cloud	L/T_{eff}	
LMC 158646	865	Large Magellanic Cloud	L/T_{eff}	
SP77 31-20	864	Large Magellanic Cloud	L/T_{eff}	
LMC 113364	864	Large Magellanic Cloud	L/T_{eff}	
SMC 83202	864	Small Magellanic Cloud	L/T_{eff}	
LMC 175746	863	Large Magellanic Cloud	L/T_{eff}	
LMC207	863	Large Magellanic Cloud	L/T_{eff}	
SP77 29-8	858	Large Magellanic Cloud	L/T_{eff}	
SP77 54-38	859–911	Large Magellanic Cloud		
LMC 174714	855–965	Large Magellanic Cloud		
LMC 176135	854	Large Magellanic Cloud	L/T_{eff}	
LMC178	845	Large Magellanic Cloud	L/T_{eff}	
SP77 31-26	845	Large Magellanic Cloud	L/T_{eff}	
LMC 106201	844	Large Magellanic Cloud	L/T_{eff}	
SP77 48-13	838	Large Magellanic Cloud	L/T_{eff}	
MSX LMC 1318	837	Large Magellanic Cloud	L/T_{eff}	
SP77 28-13	835	Large Magellanic Cloud	L/T_{eff}	
LMC 143898	833	Large Magellanic Cloud	L/T_{eff}	
TYC 9161-866-1	833	Large Magellanic Cloud	L/T_{eff}	
SMC 59803	829	Small Magellanic Cloud	L/T_{eff}	
LMC 157401	828	Large Magellanic Cloud	L/T_{eff}	
SP77 39-22	828	Large Magellanic Cloud	L/T_{eff}	
WOH S52	828	Large Magellanic Cloud	L/T_{eff}	
SP77 30-22	826	Large Magellanic Cloud	L/T_{eff}	
LMC 145728	826	Large Magellanic Cloud	L/T_{eff}	
LMC 169049	825	Large Magellanic Cloud	L/T_{eff}	
SP77 46-34	825	Large Magellanic Cloud	L/T_{eff}	
LMC 177997	825–867	Large Magellanic Cloud		
SP77 28–2	825±60	Large Magellanic Cloud	L/T_{eff}	
SP77 22–9	823 – 850	Large Magellanic Cloud	L/T_{eff}	
Z Doradus	824±108–956	Large Magellanic Cloud	L/T_{eff}	
WOH S421	822–840	Large Magellanic Cloud		
LMC 72727	822	Large Magellanic Cloud	L/T_{eff}	
SP77 37-28	821	Large Magellanic Cloud	L/T_{eff}	
MSX LMC 575	816–933	Large Magellanic Cloud		
LMC 143035	815	Large Magellanic Cloud	L/T_{eff}	
WOH S49	815	Large Magellanic Cloud	L/T_{eff}	
SP77 52-28	812	Large Magellanic Cloud	L/T_{eff}	
SHV 0520422-693821	808	Large Magellanic Cloud	L/T_{eff}	
HD 268850	808–898	Large Magellanic Cloud		
SMC 20133	809–835	Small Magellanic Cloud		
SMC 25888	804	Small Magellanic Cloud	L/T_{eff}	
SP77 55-20	803	Large Magellanic Cloud	L/T_{eff}	
IRAS 04516–6902	801 - 1,502	Large Magellanic Cloud	L/T_{eff}	
PGMW 1058	800	Large Magellanic Cloud	L/T_{eff}	
LMC 145112	798	Large Magellanic Cloud	L/T_{eff}	
SMC 47757	795	Small Magellanic Cloud	L/T_{eff}	
LMC 175709	794	Large Magellanic Cloud	L/T_{eff}	
SMC 46497	794	Small Magellanic Cloud	L/T_{eff}	
WOH S60	789	Large Magellanic Cloud	L/T_{eff}	
WOH S102	789	Large Magellanic Cloud	L/T_{eff}	
LMC 164709	787	Large Magellanic Cloud	L/T_{eff}	
SP77 31-28	787	Large Magellanic Cloud	L/T_{eff}	
TRM 73	787–816	Large Magellanic Cloud		
SP77 31-21	784	Large Magellanic Cloud	L/T_{eff}	
SMC 8930	784	Small Magellanic Cloud	L/T_{eff}	
PMMR 62	784	Small Magellanic Cloud	L/T_{eff}	
SP77 46-31	782	Large Magellanic Cloud	L/T_{eff}	
LMC211	780	Large Magellanic Cloud	L/T_{eff}	
LMC 140403	778	Large Magellanic Cloud	L/T_{eff}	
LMC 134383	778–803	Large Magellanic Cloud	L/T_{eff}	
SP77 47-11	778	Large Magellanic Cloud	L/T_{eff}	
SP77 40–7	778 – 810	Large Magellanic Cloud	L/T_{eff}	
W61 19–24	780+50 −70	Large Magellanic Cloud	L/T_{eff}	
WOH S28	780	Large Magellanic Cloud	L/T_{eff}	
LMC 141568	776	Large Magellanic Cloud	L/T_{eff}	
SP77 51-2	776	Large Magellanic Cloud	L/T_{eff}	
SP77 31–43	773	Large Magellanic Cloud	L/T_{eff}	
MSX LMC 833	773–849	Large Magellanic Cloud		
SP77 52-32	772	Large Magellanic Cloud	L/T_{eff}	
SP77 22-10	767	Large Magellanic Cloud	L/T_{eff}	
SP77 48–6	768	Large Magellanic Cloud	L/T_{eff}	
SMC 12322	765	Small Magellanic Cloud	L/T_{eff}	
WOH S517	764	Large Magellanic Cloud	L/T_{eff}	
WOH S183	763	Large Magellanic Cloud	L/T_{eff}	
LMC256	762	Large Magellanic Cloud	L/T_{eff}	
LMC 154311	762	Large Magellanic Cloud	L/T_{eff}	
LMC 119219	762	Large Magellanic Cloud	L/T_{eff}	
WOH S452	762±275	Large Magellanic Cloud	L/T_{eff}	
MSX SMC 024	761	Large Magellanic Cloud	L/T_{eff}	
WOH S282	758	Large Magellanic Cloud	L/T_{eff}	
LMC 64048	758	Large Magellanic Cloud	L/T_{eff}	
PGMW 3160	758	Large Magellanic Cloud	L/T_{eff}	
WOH S438	757±211	Large Magellanic Cloud	L/T_{eff}	
LMC 61753	755	Large Magellanic Cloud	L/T_{eff}	
LMC 140296	754	Large Magellanic Cloud	L/T_{eff}	
WOH S478	753	Large Magellanic Cloud	L/T_{eff}	
LMC 139027	751 – 790	Large Magellanic Cloud	L/T_{eff}	
SP77 45–16	749 – 800	Large Magellanic Cloud	L/T_{eff}	
SP77 37-20	749	Large Magellanic Cloud	L/T_{eff}	
SP77 54–27	750 – 758 – 800	Large Magellanic Cloud	L/T_{eff}	
LMC 155529	747	Large Magellanic Cloud	L/T_{eff}	
LMC 143877	746	Large Magellanic Cloud	L/T_{eff}	
SMC 64663	745	Small Magellanic Cloud	L/T_{eff}	
WOH G302	745	Large Magellanic Cloud	L/T_{eff}	
TRM 65	743	Large Magellanic Cloud	L/T_{eff}	
HV 12149	741–767	Small Magellanic Cloud		
SMC 50840	740	Small Magellanic Cloud	L/T_{eff}	
SMC 46662	740–874	Small Magellanic Cloud		
SP77 29-11	738	Large Magellanic Cloud	L/T_{eff}	
SMC 30616	737	Small Magellanic Cloud	L/T_{eff}	
LMC 162635	736	Large Magellanic Cloud	L/T_{eff}	
SP77 39–17	736 – 760	Large Magellanic Cloud	L/T_{eff}	
LMC 163466	734	Large Magellanic Cloud	L/T_{eff}	
HV 2310	734	Large Magellanic Cloud	L/T_{eff}	
HD 269723	734±17, 814–829	Large Magellanic Cloud	L/T_{eff}	A yellow hypergiant.
SP77 44-17	732	Large Magellanic Cloud	L/T_{eff}	
SP77 38-5a	732	Large Magellanic Cloud	L/T_{eff}	
LMC 67982	730	Large Magellanic Cloud	L/T_{eff}	
LHA 120-S 129	730	Large Magellanic Cloud	L/T_{eff}	
PMMR 64	730+75 −65	Small Magellanic Cloud	L/T_{eff}	
SP77 51-15	727	Large Magellanic Cloud	L/T_{eff}	
LMC 168757	725	Large Magellanic Cloud	L/T_{eff}	
LMC 163007	725	Large Magellanic Cloud	L/T_{eff}	
W61 8–14	724	Large Magellanic Cloud	L/T_{eff}	
IRAS 05425-6914	724	Large Magellanic Cloud	L/T_{eff}	
SMC 55188	724	Small Magellanic Cloud	L/T_{eff}	
SP77 44-13	721	Large Magellanic Cloud	L/T_{eff}	
MSX LMC 905	719	Large Magellanic Cloud	L/T_{eff}	
LMC 147928	719	Large Magellanic Cloud	L/T_{eff}	
LH 43–15	719 – 740	Large Magellanic Cloud	L/T_{eff}	
PMMR 116	717	Small Magellanic Cloud	L/T_{eff}	
LMC 123778	715	Large Magellanic Cloud	L/T_{eff}	
WOH S314	714	Large Magellanic Cloud	L/T_{eff}	
SP77 61-23	713	Large Magellanic Cloud	L/T_{eff}	
WOH S230	713	Large Magellanic Cloud	L/T_{eff}	
LMC 150396	710	Large Magellanic Cloud	L/T_{eff}	
SP77 48-17	709	Large Magellanic Cloud	L/T_{eff}	
LMC 165242	707	Large Magellanic Cloud	L/T_{eff}	
SP77 51-19	707	Large Magellanic Cloud	L/T_{eff}	
LMC 170539	707	Large Magellanic Cloud	L/T_{eff}	
LMC 154729	705	Large Magellanic Cloud	L/T_{eff}	
OGLE BRIGHT-LMC-LPV-101	703	Large Magellanic Cloud	L/T_{eff}	
MSX SMC 055	702–1,557+215 −130	Small Magellanic Cloud	L/T_{eff}	A super-AGB candidate.
LMC 168290	702	Large Magellanic Cloud	L/T_{eff}	
LMC180	702	Large Magellanic Cloud	L/T_{eff}	
SP77 45-2	702	Large Magellanic Cloud	L/T_{eff}	
SP77 48–6	700+29 −28	Large Magellanic Cloud	L/T_{eff}	A yellow hypergiant.
The following well-known stars are listed for the purpose of comparison.
HV 2112	675 – 1,193	Small Magellanic Cloud	L/T_{eff}	It has been previously considered to be a possible Thorne–Żytkow object.
HV 11417	673–798	Small Magellanic Cloud	L/T_{eff}	Candidate Thorne-Zytkow object.
HD 269953	647–720	Large Magellanic Cloud	L/T_{eff}	A yellow hypergiant.
HD 271182	621	Large Magellanic Cloud	L/T_{eff}	A yellow hypergiant.
HD 33579	471	Large Magellanic Cloud	L/T_{eff}	The brightest star in the Large Magellanic Cloud.
S Doradus	100	Large Magellanic Cloud	L/T_{eff}	A luminous blue variable in the S Doradus instability strip.
HD 37974	99	Large Magellanic Cloud	L/T_{eff}	An unusual blue hypergiant with a large dusty disk.
R136a1	42.7+1.6 −0.9	Large Magellanic Cloud	L/T_{eff}	One of the most luminous and most massive stars.
BAT 99-98	37.5	Large Magellanic Cloud	L/T_{eff}	One of the most luminous and most massive stars.
HD 5980 A	24	Small Magellanic Cloud	L/T_{eff}	A luminous blue variable and one of the most luminous stars.

=== Andromeda (M31) and Triangulum (M33) galaxies ===
List of the largest known stars in Andromeda and Triangulum galaxies
Star name	Solar radius (R_{☉})	Galaxy	Method	Notes
Theoretical limit of star size (Andromeda Galaxy)	≳1,750		L/T_{eff}	Estimated by measuring the fraction of red supergiants at higher luminosities in a large sample of stars. Assumes an effective temperature of 3,625 K. Reported for reference
Theoretical limit of star size (Triangulum Galaxy)	≳1,500		L/T_{eff}	Estimated by measuring the fraction of red supergiants at higher luminosities in a large sample of stars. Assumes an effective temperature of 3,605 K. Reported for reference
LGGS J013414.27+303417.7	1,479	Triangulum Galaxy	L/T_{eff}	
LGGS J013418.56+303808.6	1,363	Triangulum Galaxy	L/T_{eff}	
LGGS J004514.91+413735.0	1,324	Andromeda Galaxy	L/T_{eff}	
LGGS J004125.23+411208.9	1,302	Andromeda Galaxy	L/T_{eff}	
LGGS J013350.62+303230.3	1,283	Triangulum Galaxy	L/T_{eff}	
LGGS J004312.43+413747.1	1,279	Andromeda Galaxy	L/T_{eff}	
LGGS J003951.33+405303.7	1,272	Andromeda Galaxy	L/T_{eff}	
M31-1775	1,254	Andromeda Galaxy	L/T_{eff}	
LGGS J013416.52+305155.4	1,227	Triangulum Galaxy	L/T_{eff}	
LGGS J004416.83+411933.2	1,209	Andromeda Galaxy	L/T_{eff}	
LGGS J004531.13+414825.7	1,201	Andromeda Galaxy	L/T_{eff}	
2MASS J01343365+3046547	1,196	Triangulum Galaxy	L/T_{eff}	
LGGS J013409.63+303907.6	1,182	Triangulum Galaxy	L/T_{eff}	
LGGS J004133.18+411217.2	1,180	Andromeda Galaxy	L/T_{eff}	
LGGS J004455.90+413035.2	1,172	Andromeda Galaxy	L/T_{eff}	
LGGS J013352.96+303816.0	1,163	Andromeda Galaxy	L/T_{eff}	
LGGS J004047.22+404445.5	1,162	Andromeda Galaxy	L/T_{eff}	
LGGS J004254.18+414033.6	1,154	Andromeda Galaxy	L/T_{eff}	
LGGS J004428.48+415130.9	1,130	Andromeda Galaxy	L/T_{eff}	
LGGS J013414.27+303417.7	1,129	Triangulum Galaxy	L/T_{eff}	
GAPO 111	1,122	Andromeda Galaxy	L/T_{eff}	
LGGS J013341.98+302102.0	1,119	Triangulum Galaxy	L/T_{eff}	
LGGS J013307.37+304543.2	1,119	Triangulum Galaxy	L/T_{eff}	
M31-1515	1,112	Andromeda Galaxy	L/T_{eff}	Within a binary star system with an OB companion.
LGGS J004218.33+412633.9	1,111	Andromeda Galaxy	L/T_{eff}	
LGGS J004102.54+403426.5	1,108	Andromeda Galaxy	L/T_{eff}	
LGGS J013335.90+303344.5	1,104	Triangulum Galaxy	L/T_{eff}	
LGGS J013358.54+303419.9	1,103	Triangulum Galaxy	L/T_{eff}	
LGGS J013414.49+303511.6	1,102	Triangulum Galaxy	L/T_{eff}	
LGGS J013336.64+303532.3	1,102–1,408	Triangulum Galaxy	L/T_{eff}	
LGGS J004259.34+413726.0	1,094	Andromeda Galaxy	L/T_{eff}	
LGGS J004509.98+414627.5	1,089	Andromeda Galaxy	L/T_{eff}	
LGGS J013241.94+302047.5	1,083	Triangulum Galaxy	L/T_{eff}	
LGGS J004034.74+404459.6	1,078	Andromeda Galaxy	L/T_{eff}	
LGGS J004059.50+404542.6	1,071	Andromeda Galaxy	L/T_{eff}	
LGGS J013430.75+303218.8	1,067	Triangulum Galaxy	L/T_{eff}	
LGGS J013412.27+305314.1	1,063–1,066	Triangulum Galaxy	L/T_{eff}	
LGGS J013328.17+304741.5	1,063	Triangulum Galaxy	L/T_{eff}	
LGGS J004524.97+420727.2	1,059	Andromeda Galaxy	L/T_{eff}	
LGGS J013233.77+302718.8	1,058–1,129	Triangulum Galaxy	L/T_{eff}	
LGGS J004125.72+411212.7	1,058	Andromeda Galaxy	L/T_{eff}	
LGGS J004114.18+403759.8	1,058	Andromeda Galaxy	L/T_{eff}	
M33-2747	1,057	Triangulum Galaxy	L/T_{eff}	
LGGS J013307.60+304259.0	1,051	Triangulum Galaxy	L/T_{eff}	
LGGS J004103.67+410211.8	1,047	Andromeda Galaxy	L/T_{eff}	
LGGS J013305.48+303138.5	1,046	Triangulum Galaxy	L/T_{eff}	
LGGS J004442.41+412649.5	1,040	Andromeda Galaxy	L/T_{eff}	
LGGS J013403.87+303753.2	1,040	Triangulum Galaxy	L/T_{eff}	
LGGS J013351.47+303640.3	1,034	Triangulum Galaxy	L/T_{eff}	
LGGS J004306.62+413806.2	1,028	Andromeda Galaxy	L/T_{eff}	
LGGS J013303.54+303201.2	1,027–1,131	Triangulum Galaxy	L/T_{eff}	
LGGS J004234.41+405855.9	1,023	Andromeda Galaxy	L/T_{eff}	
LGGS J004051.31+404421.7	1,022	Andromeda Galaxy	L/T_{eff}	
LGGS J004031.00+404311.1	1,011	Andromeda Galaxy	L/T_{eff}	
LGGS J013406.20+303913.6	1,009	Triangulum Galaxy	L/T_{eff}	
LGGS J013344.10+304425.1	1,007	Triangulum Galaxy	L/T_{eff}	
LGGS J004307.36+405852.2	1,007	Andromeda Galaxy	L/T_{eff}	
LGGS J013407.13+303929.5	994	Triangulum Galaxy	L/T_{eff}	
LGGS J013312.35+303033.9	993	Triangulum Galaxy	L/T_{eff}	
LGGS J013330.05+303145.9	988	Triangulum Galaxy	L/T_{eff}	
LGGS J013350.84+304403.1	984	Triangulum Galaxy	L/T_{eff}	
LGGS J013329.47+301848.3	981	Triangulum Galaxy	L/T_{eff}	
LGGS J004148.74+410843.0	981	Andromeda Galaxy	L/T_{eff}	
LGGS J004415.76+411750.7	977	Andromeda Galaxy	L/T_{eff}	
LGGS J004127.44+411240.7	977	Andromeda Galaxy	L/T_{eff}	
LGGS J013312.75+303946.1	975	Triangulum Galaxy	L/T_{eff}	
LGGS J004027.36+410444.9	973	Andromeda Galaxy	L/T_{eff}	
LGGS J013434.35+302627.3	973	Triangulum Galaxy	L/T_{eff}	
LGGS J013423.29+305655.0	993–972	Triangulum Galaxy	L/T_{eff}	
LGGS J013319.13+303642.5	970	Triangulum Galaxy	L/T_{eff}	
LGGS J004305.77+410742.5	969	Andromeda Galaxy	L/T_{eff}	
LGGS J013403.73+304202.4	965–1,032	Triangulum Galaxy	L/T_{eff}	
LGGS J004346.10+411138.8	962	Andromeda Galaxy	L/T_{eff}	
LGGS J004419.20+412343.7	959	Andromeda Galaxy	L/T_{eff}	
LGGS J013353.91+302641.8	959–1,008	Triangulum Galaxy	L/T_{eff}	
LGGS J013315.23+305329.0	958	Triangulum Galaxy	L/T_{eff}	
LGGS J013315.23+305329.0	956	Triangulum Galaxy	L/T_{eff}	
LGGS J004138.35+412320.7	954	Andromeda Galaxy	L/T_{eff}	
LGGS J004419.45+411749.5	950	Andromeda Galaxy	L/T_{eff}	
LGGS J013413.95+303339.6	948	Triangulum Galaxy	L/T_{eff}	
LGGS J013336.42+303530.9	947	Triangulum Galaxy	L/T_{eff}	
LGGS J004047.82+410936.4	943	Andromeda Galaxy	L/T_{eff}	
LGGS J013258.18+303606.3	943	Triangulum Galaxy	L/T_{eff}	
LGGS J004447.74+413050.0	938	Andromeda Galaxy	L/T_{eff}	
2MASS J01343131+3046088	938	Triangulum Galaxy	L/T_{eff}	
LGGS J004346.18+411515.0	936	Andromeda Galaxy	L/T_{eff}	
LGGS J004304.62+410348.4	936	Andromeda Galaxy	L/T_{eff}	
LGGS J004458.28+413154.3	933	Andromeda Galaxy	L/T_{eff}	
LGGS J004102.82+410422.3	933	Andromeda Galaxy	L/T_{eff}	
LGGS J013344.33+303636.0	932	Triangulum Galaxy	L/T_{eff}	
LGGS J004631.49+421133.1	932	Andromeda Galaxy	L/T_{eff}	
LGGS J013321.44+304045.4	932–1,015	Triangulum Galaxy	L/T_{eff}	
LGGS J013358.04+304900.1	931	Triangulum Galaxy	L/T_{eff}	
LGGS J013314.31+302952.9	1,067–930	Triangulum Galaxy	L/T_{eff}	
LGGS J013315.97+303153.7	929	Triangulum Galaxy	L/T_{eff}	
LGGS J004126.14+403346.5	927	Andromeda Galaxy	L/T_{eff}	
M31-1372	926	Andromeda Galaxy	L/T_{eff}	
LGGS J004347.31+411203.6	925	Andromeda Galaxy	L/T_{eff}	
LGGS J004252.78+405627.5	923	Andromeda Galaxy	L/T_{eff}	
LGGS J013411.54+303312.6	918	Triangulum Galaxy	L/T_{eff}	
LGGS J013357.08+303817.8	918	Triangulum Galaxy	L/T_{eff}	
LGGS J003943.89+402104.6	917	Andromeda Galaxy	L/T_{eff}	
LGGS J004503.35+413026.3	916	Andromeda Galaxy	L/T_{eff}	
LGGS J013338.97+303828.9	915	Triangulum Galaxy	L/T_{eff}	
LGGS J013330.27+303510.6	915	Triangulum Galaxy	L/T_{eff}	
LGGS J004033.06+404303.1	912	Andromeda Galaxy	L/T_{eff}	
LGGS J004357.15+411136.6	911	Andromeda Galaxy	L/T_{eff}	
LGGS J004406.60+411536.6	911	Andromeda Galaxy	L/T_{eff}	
LGGS J013312.38+302453.2	911–952	Triangulum Galaxy	L/T_{eff}	
LGGS J004451.76+420006.0	911	Andromeda Galaxy	L/T_{eff}	
LGGS J013322.82+301910.9	934–911	Triangulum Galaxy	L/T_{eff}	
M31-504	919	Andromeda Galaxy	L/T_{eff}	
LGGS J013355.56+304120.9	908	Triangulum Galaxy	L/T_{eff}	
LGGS J004034.40+403627.4	907	Andromeda Galaxy	L/T_{eff}	
LGGS J003910.56+402545.6	906	Andromeda Galaxy	L/T_{eff}	
LGGS J004142.43+411814.1	906	Andromeda Galaxy	L/T_{eff}	
LGGS J013316.57+303051.9	902	Triangulum Galaxy	L/T_{eff}	
LGGS J013245.59+303518.7	900	Triangulum Galaxy	L/T_{eff}	
LGGS J004034.67+404322.5	898	Andromeda Galaxy	L/T_{eff}	
LGGS J004027.65+405126.7	898	Andromeda Galaxy	L/T_{eff}	
LGGS J004322.75+411101.8	895	Andromeda Galaxy	L/T_{eff}	
LGGS J004116.47+410813.7	895	Andromeda Galaxy	L/T_{eff}	
LGGS J013306.33+303208.2	894	Triangulum Galaxy	L/T_{eff}	
LGGS J004039.12+404252.3	894	Andromeda Galaxy	L/T_{eff}	
LGGS J004433.96+415414.8	893	Andromeda Galaxy	L/T_{eff}	
M31-1414	893	Andromeda Galaxy	L/T_{eff}	
LGGS J013454.31+304109.8	891	Triangulum Galaxy	L/T_{eff}	
LGGS J004030.64+404246.2	890	Andromeda Galaxy	L/T_{eff}	
M33-113	890	Triangulum Galaxy	L/T_{eff}	
LGGS J004252.67+413615.2	889	Andromeda Galaxy	L/T_{eff}	
LGGS J013349.94+302928.8	888	Triangulum Galaxy	L/T_{eff}	
2MASS J01335010+3039106	886	Triangulum Galaxy	L/T_{eff}	
LGGS J013357.37+304558.7	886	Triangulum Galaxy	L/T_{eff}	
LGGS J013338.77+303532.9	885	Triangulum Galaxy	L/T_{eff}	
LGGS J013359.20+303212.1	884	Triangulum Galaxy	L/T_{eff}	
LGGS J013340.42+303131.3	880	Triangulum Galaxy	L/T_{eff}	
LGGS J004511.40+413717.8	880	Andromeda Galaxy	L/T_{eff}	
LGGS J013352.16+303902.2	880	Triangulum Galaxy	L/T_{eff}	
LGGS J004219.25+405116.4	880	Andromeda Galaxy	L/T_{eff}	
LGGS J004331.90+411145.0	880	Andromeda Galaxy	L/T_{eff}	
2MASS J01333718+3038206	879	Triangulum Galaxy	L/T_{eff}	
LGGS J013415.42+302816.4	876	Triangulum Galaxy	L/T_{eff}	
LGGS J013345.01+302105.1	876	Triangulum Galaxy	L/T_{eff}	
LGGS J004107.23+411636.8	870	Andromeda Galaxy	L/T_{eff}	
LGGS J013417.83+303356.0	867	Triangulum Galaxy	L/T_{eff}	
LGGS J004120.25+403838.1	867	Andromeda Galaxy	L/T_{eff}	
LGGS J004402.38+412114.9	866	Andromeda Galaxy	L/T_{eff}	
2MASS J01334194+3038565	866	Triangulum Galaxy	L/T_{eff}	
LGGS J013309.10+303017.8	865–933	Triangulum Galaxy	L/T_{eff}	
LGGS J004429.36+412307.8	862	Andromeda Galaxy	L/T_{eff}	
LGGS J013310.20+303314.4	861	Triangulum Galaxy	L/T_{eff}	
LGGS J004404.60+412729.8	860	Andromeda Galaxy	L/T_{eff}	
LGGS J003907.69+402859.5	860	Andromeda Galaxy	L/T_{eff}	
LGGS J004219.64+412736.1	859	Andromeda Galaxy	L/T_{eff}	
LGGS J003949.31+402049.1	859	Andromeda Galaxy	L/T_{eff}	
LGGS J013310.16+302726.3	855	Triangulum Galaxy	L/T_{eff}	
LGGS J004036.97+403412.4	855	Andromeda Galaxy	L/T_{eff}	
LGGS J013343.68+304450.7	855	Triangulum Galaxy	L/T_{eff}	
LGGS J013409.10+303351.8	854	Triangulum Galaxy	L/T_{eff}	
LGGS J013407.11+303918.7	854	Triangulum Galaxy	L/T_{eff}	
LGGS J004107.11+411635.6	854	Andromeda Galaxy	L/T_{eff}	
LGGS J013400.01+304622.2	852	Triangulum Galaxy	L/T_{eff}	
LGGS J013327.14+303917.4	851	Andromeda Galaxy	L/T_{eff}	
LGGS J013339.79+304032.2	850	Triangulum Galaxy	L/T_{eff}	
LGGS J004501.30+413922.5	850	Andromeda Galaxy	L/T_{eff}	
LGGS J004450.87+412924.3	850	Andromeda Galaxy	L/T_{eff}	
LGGS J004040.69+405908.1	850	Andromeda Galaxy	L/T_{eff}	
LGGS J003942.92+402051.1	850	Andromeda Galaxy	L/T_{eff}	
2MASS J01335092+3040481	850	Triangulum Galaxy	L/T_{eff}	
LGGS J013315.19+305319.8	847	Triangulum Galaxy	L/T_{eff}	
LGGS J013416.89+305158.3	845–920	Triangulum Galaxy	L/T_{eff}	
LGGS J004415.17+415640.6	845	Andromeda Galaxy	L/T_{eff}	
LGGS J004424.94+412322.3	844	Andromeda Galaxy	L/T_{eff}	
LGGS J013331.93+301952.9	838	Triangulum Galaxy	L/T_{eff}	
LGGS J004406.16+414846.4	836	Andromeda Galaxy	L/T_{eff}	
M33-453	836	Triangulum Galaxy	L/T_{eff}	
LGGS J013445.65+303235.4	835	Triangulum Galaxy	L/T_{eff}	
LGGS J004109.39+404901.9	834	Andromeda Galaxy	L/T_{eff}	
LGGS J004423.83+414928.6	833	Andromeda Galaxy	L/T_{eff}	
LGGS J013242.31+302113.9	833	Triangulum Galaxy	L/T_{eff}	
LGGS J004030.48+404051.1	833	Andromeda Galaxy	L/T_{eff}	
LGGS J004118.29+404940.3	832	Andromeda Galaxy	L/T_{eff}	
LGGS J013414.17+304701.9	831	Triangulum Galaxy	L/T_{eff}	
LGGS J013328.89+303058.0	831	Triangulum Galaxy	L/T_{eff}	
LGGS J004107.70+403702.3	831	Andromeda Galaxy	L/T_{eff}	
LGGS J003925.67+404111.8	831	Andromeda Galaxy	L/T_{eff}	
LGGS J004306.95+410038.2	826	Andromeda Galaxy	L/T_{eff}	
LGGS J013408.81+304637.8	826	Triangulum Galaxy	L/T_{eff}	
LGGS J013345.22+303138.2	826	Triangulum Galaxy	L/T_{eff}	
LGGS J003950.65+402531.8	825	Andromeda Galaxy	L/T_{eff}	
LGGS J013427.65+305642.4	825	Triangulum Galaxy	L/T_{eff}	
M33-374	824	Triangulum Galaxy	L/T_{eff}	
LGGS J013500.04+303703.8	823	Triangulum Galaxy	L/T_{eff}	
LGGS J004108.42+410655.3	822	Andromeda Galaxy	L/T_{eff}	
LGGS J013340.77+302108.7	821–820	Triangulum Galaxy	L/T_{eff}	
LGGS J004458.57+412925.1	821	Andromeda Galaxy	L/T_{eff}	
LGGS J013309.97+302727.5	973	Triangulum Galaxy	L/T_{eff}	
LGGS J004124.81+411206.1	819	Andromeda Galaxy	L/T_{eff}	
LGGS J013401.65+303128.7	819	Triangulum Galaxy	L/T_{eff}	
LGGS J013455.65+304349.0	816	Triangulum Galaxy	L/T_{eff}	
LGGS J013310.60+302301.8	816	Triangulum Galaxy	L/T_{eff}	
LGGS J004544.71+414331.9	815	Andromeda Galaxy	L/T_{eff}	
LGGS J004119.35+410836.4	813	Andromeda Galaxy	L/T_{eff}	
LGGS J013436.65+304517.1	814–812	Triangulum Galaxy	L/T_{eff}	
LGGS J013301.79+303954.3	812	Triangulum Galaxy	L/T_{eff}	
LGGS J013328.85+310041.7	810–909	Triangulum Galaxy	L/T_{eff}	
LGGS J013401.08+303432.2	809	Triangulum Galaxy	L/T_{eff}	
LGGS J004036.45+403613.1	808	Andromeda Galaxy	L/T_{eff}	
LGGS J004521.53+413758.6	807	Andromeda Galaxy	L/T_{eff}	
LGGS J004432.38+415149.9	807	Andromeda Galaxy	L/T_{eff}	
LGGS J013306.95+303506.1	807	Triangulum Galaxy	L/T_{eff}	Contradictory classification in literature, it has been considered a candidate LBV, a RSG or a BSG.
LGGS J013242.26+302114.1	807	Triangulum Galaxy	L/T_{eff}	
LGGS J013321.94+304112.0	806–829	Triangulum Galaxy	L/T_{eff}	
LGGS J013304.56+303043.2	804	Triangulum Galaxy	L/T_{eff}	
LGGS J004331.73+414223.0	803	Andromeda Galaxy	L/T_{eff}	
LGGS J004044.17+410729.0	803	Andromeda Galaxy	L/T_{eff}	
LGGS J013352.83+305605.2	803	Triangulum Galaxy	L/T_{eff}	
LGGS J013343.30+303318.9	873–803	Triangulum Galaxy	L/T_{eff}	
LGGS J013342.61+303534.7	800	Triangulum Galaxy	L/T_{eff}	
LGGS J013326.90+310054.2	800–909	Triangulum Galaxy	L/T_{eff}	
M33-920	799	Triangulum Galaxy	L/T_{eff}	
LGGS J013300.94+303404.3	798	Triangulum Galaxy	L/T_{eff}	
LGGS J013416.06+303730.0	798	Triangulum Galaxy	L/T_{eff}	
LGGS J004503.83+413737.0	797	Andromeda Galaxy	L/T_{eff}	
M33-255	797	Triangulum Galaxy	L/T_{eff}	
LGGS J004438.83+415253.0	794	Andromeda Galaxy	L/T_{eff}	
LGGS J004235.88+405442.2	794	Andromeda Galaxy	L/T_{eff}	
LGGS J004335.28+410959.7	794	Andromeda Galaxy	L/T_{eff}	
LGGS J013402.32+303828.4	793	Triangulum Galaxy	L/T_{eff}	
LGGS J004125.55+405034.8	792	Andromeda Galaxy	L/T_{eff}	
M31-2338	792	Andromeda Galaxy	L/T_{eff}	
LGGS J013507.43+304132.6	791	Triangulum Galaxy	L/T_{eff}	
LGGS J013353.25+303918.7	791	Triangulum Galaxy	L/T_{eff}	
LGGS J004308.71+410604.5	790	Andromeda Galaxy	L/T_{eff}	
LGGS J013417.17+304826.6	789	Triangulum Galaxy	L/T_{eff}	
LGGS J013310.71+302714.9	789–884	Triangulum Galaxy	L/T_{eff}	
LGGS J013432.36+304159.0	788	Triangulum Galaxy	L/T_{eff}	
LGGS J004356.23+414641.8	788	Andromeda Galaxy	L/T_{eff}	
LGGS J013340.77+302108.7	788	Triangulum Galaxy	L/T_{eff}	
LGGS J013346.61+304125.4	786	Triangulum Galaxy	L/T_{eff}	
M31-2420	786	Andromeda Galaxy	L/T_{eff}	
LGGS J004447.08+412801.7	785	Andromeda Galaxy	L/T_{eff}	
LGGS J004255.95+404857.5	785	Andromeda Galaxy	L/T_{eff}	
LGGS J013231.91+302329.1	783	Triangulum Galaxy	L/T_{eff}	
M31-2252	783	Andromeda Galaxy	L/T_{eff}	
LGGS J004110.32+410433.4	782	Andromeda Galaxy	L/T_{eff}	
LGGS J004159.06+405718.7	780	Andromeda Galaxy	L/T_{eff}	
M31-1494	758	Andromeda Galaxy	L/T_{eff}	
LGGS J004241.10+413142.3	775	Andromeda Galaxy	L/T_{eff}	
LGGS J013401.88+303858.3	776	Triangulum Galaxy	L/T_{eff}	
LGGS J013445.12+305858.9	773	Triangulum Galaxy	L/T_{eff}	
LGGS J004030.92+404329.3	773	Andromeda Galaxy	L/T_{eff}	
M31-1410	772	Andromeda Galaxy	L/T_{eff}	
LGGS J013359.57+303413.5	771	Triangulum Galaxy	L/T_{eff}	
LGGS J004353.97+411255.6	771	Andromeda Galaxy	L/T_{eff}	
LGGS J004029.03+403412.6	770	Andromeda Galaxy	L/T_{eff}	
LGGS J004526.24+420047.5	767	Andromeda Galaxy	L/T_{eff}	
LGGS J013348.44+302029.8	767	Triangulum Galaxy	L/T_{eff}	
LGGS J004552.15+421003.5	767	Andromeda Galaxy	L/T_{eff}	
M31-689	767	Andromeda Galaxy	L/T_{eff}	
LGGS J013320.75+303204.8	764	Triangulum Galaxy	L/T_{eff}	
LGGS J013416.28+303353.5	763–801	Triangulum Galaxy	L/T_{eff}	
LGGS J013357.91+303338.9	763	Triangulum Galaxy	L/T_{eff}	
LGGS J013253.14+303515.3	762	Triangulum Galaxy	L/T_{eff}	
LGGS J004051.18+403053.4	762	Andromeda Galaxy	L/T_{eff}	
LGGS J013402.57+303746.3	762	Triangulum Galaxy	L/T_{eff}	
LGGS J013352.15+304006.4	762	Triangulum Galaxy	L/T_{eff}	
LGGS J004427.07+415203.0	762	Andromeda Galaxy	L/T_{eff}	
LGGS J004233.23+405917.0	762	Andromeda Galaxy	L/T_{eff}	
LGGS J004156.96+405720.8	761	Andromeda Galaxy	L/T_{eff}	
LGGS J004117.14+410843.7	761	Andromeda Galaxy	L/T_{eff}	
LGGS J004124.80+411634.7	760, 1,205, 1,240	Andromeda Galaxy	L/T_{eff}	
LGGS J004109.61+404920.4	761	Andromeda Galaxy	L/T_{eff}	
LGGS J003930.09+402313.0	759	Andromeda Galaxy	L/T_{eff}	
LGGS J013324.71+303423.7	758	Triangulum Galaxy	L/T_{eff}	
LGGS J013317.40+303210.8	758	Triangulum Galaxy	L/T_{eff}	
LGGS J013411.83+304631.0	756	Triangulum Galaxy	L/T_{eff}	
LGGS J004417.75+420039.1	755	Andromeda Galaxy	L/T_{eff}	
LGGS J004454.50+413007.8	755	Andromeda Galaxy	L/T_{eff}	
LGGS J013348.77+304526.8	754	Triangulum Galaxy	L/T_{eff}	
LGGS J004019.69+404912.2	754	Andromeda Galaxy	L/T_{eff}	
LGGS J004340.32+411157.1	753	Andromeda Galaxy	L/T_{eff}	
LGGS J013304.02+303215.2	753	Triangulum Galaxy	L/T_{eff}	
LGGS J013409.16+303846.9	752	Triangulum Galaxy	L/T_{eff}	
LGGS J013459.81+304156.9	751–765	Triangulum Galaxy	L/T_{eff}	
LGGS J013334.82+302029.1	751–930	Triangulum Galaxy	L/T_{eff}	
LGGS J013400.71+303422.3	750	Triangulum Galaxy	L/T_{eff}	
LGGS J004224.65+412623.7	749	Andromeda Galaxy	L/T_{eff}	
LGGS J013414.88+303401.2	749	Triangulum Galaxy	L/T_{eff}	
LGGS J004343.33+414529.5	749	Andromeda Galaxy	L/T_{eff}	
LGGS J004034.76+403648.9	749	Andromeda Galaxy	L/T_{eff}	
LGGS J013353.53+303418.7	749	Triangulum Galaxy	L/T_{eff}	
LGGS J004501.84+420259.2	747	Andromeda Galaxy	L/T_{eff}	
LGGS J013409.70+303916.2	744	Triangulum Galaxy	L/T_{eff}	
LGGS J013345.71+303609.8	744	Triangulum Galaxy	L/T_{eff}	
LGGS J004342.75+411442.8	743	Andromeda Galaxy	L/T_{eff}	
M31-1621	743	Andromeda Galaxy	L/T_{eff}	
LGGS J013333.32+303147.2	741	Triangulum Galaxy	L/T_{eff}	
LGGS J013338.97+303506.1	741	Triangulum Galaxy	L/T_{eff}	
LGGS J013303.61+302841.5	741	Triangulum Galaxy	L/T_{eff}	
LGGS J004201.12+412516.0	737	Andromeda Galaxy	L/T_{eff}	
LGGS J004341.35+411213.8	734	Andromeda Galaxy	L/T_{eff}	
LGGS J013438.76+304608.1	734	Triangulum Galaxy	L/T_{eff}	
LGGS J013402.33+301749.2	734–786	Triangulum Galaxy	L/T_{eff}	
2MASS J01334180+3040207	732	Triangulum Galaxy	L/T_{eff}	
LGGS J013354.32+301724.6	732–854	Triangulum Galaxy	L/T_{eff}	
LGGS J013334.23+303400.3	732	Triangulum Galaxy	L/T_{eff}	
LGGS J013357.60+304113.3	730	Triangulum Galaxy	L/T_{eff}	
LGGS J004614.57+421117.4	730	Andromeda Galaxy	L/T_{eff}	
LGGS J004120.96+404125.3	730	Andromeda Galaxy	L/T_{eff}	
LGGS J004228.46+405519.0	728	Andromeda Galaxy	L/T_{eff}	
LGGS J004024.52+404444.8	728	Andromeda Galaxy	L/T_{eff}	
LGGS J013349.75+304459.8	727	Triangulum Galaxy	L/T_{eff}	
LGGS J013306.88+303004.6	727	Triangulum Galaxy	L/T_{eff}	
LGGS J004358.00+412114.1	727	Andromeda Galaxy	L/T_{eff}	
LGGS J004147.27+411537.8	727	Andromeda Galaxy	L/T_{eff}	
LGGS J013407.23+304158.8	725–833	Triangulum Galaxy	L/T_{eff}	
LGGS J004519.82+415531.9	725	Andromeda Galaxy	L/T_{eff}	
LGGS J004410.84+411538.8	725	Andromeda Galaxy	L/T_{eff}	
LGGS J013407.38+305935.0	724	Triangulum Galaxy	L/T_{eff}	
LGGS J004438.75+415553.6	724	Andromeda Galaxy	L/T_{eff}	
LGGS J004324.16+411228.3	723	Andromeda Galaxy	L/T_{eff}	
LGGS J004059.58+403815.6	723	Andromeda Galaxy	L/T_{eff}	
LGGS J013327.40+304126.4	721	Triangulum Galaxy	L/T_{eff}	
LGGS J013243.72+301912.5	721–783	Triangulum Galaxy	L/T_{eff}	
Gaia DR3 303379932695513216	720	Triangulum Galaxy	L/T_{eff}	
LGGS J004558.92+414642.1	720	Andromeda Galaxy	L/T_{eff}	
LGGS J004103.46+403633.2	717	Andromeda Galaxy	L/T_{eff}	
LGGS J013324.89+301754.3	717	Triangulum Galaxy	L/T_{eff}	
LGGS J004015.18+405947.7	716	Andromeda Galaxy	L/T_{eff}	
LGGS J013414.53+303557.7	715	Triangulum Galaxy	L/T_{eff}	
LGGS J013351.89+303853.5	715	Triangulum Galaxy	L/T_{eff}	
LGGS J004458.82+413050.4	715	Andromeda Galaxy	L/T_{eff}	
LGGS J013352.51+303942.2	715	Triangulum Galaxy	L/T_{eff}	
LGGS J004124.91+411133.1	715	Andromeda Galaxy	L/T_{eff}	
LGGS J004604.18+415135.4	713	Andromeda Galaxy	L/T_{eff}	
LGGS J013305.17+303119.8	711	Triangulum Galaxy	L/T_{eff}	
LGGS J004517.25+413948.2	711	Andromeda Galaxy	L/T_{eff}	
LGGS J013349.86+303246.1	710–795	Triangulum Galaxy	L/T_{eff}	A yellow supergiant.
2MASS J01335929+3034435	709	Triangulum Galaxy	L/T_{eff}	
LGGS J004230.32+405624.1	708	Andromeda Galaxy	L/T_{eff}	
LGGS J004101.02+403506.1	708	Andromeda Galaxy	L/T_{eff}	
LGGS J004119.21+411237.2	707	Andromeda Galaxy	L/T_{eff}	
LGGS J004606.25+415018.9	707	Andromeda Galaxy	L/T_{eff}	
LGGS J013442.05+304540.2	707–707	Triangulum Galaxy	L/T_{eff}	
LGGS J013431.84+302721.5	707–717	Triangulum Galaxy	L/T_{eff}	
LGGS J013304.68+304456.0	707–739	Triangulum Galaxy	L/T_{eff}	
LGGS J004432.27+415158.4	705	Andromeda Galaxy	L/T_{eff}	
2MASS J01335131+3039149	704	Triangulum Galaxy	L/T_{eff}	
LGGS J013339.46+302113.0	703–748	Triangulum Galaxy	L/T_{eff}	
LGGS J003935.36+401946.4	703	Andromeda Galaxy	L/T_{eff}	
LGGS J013343.03+303433.5	702	Triangulum Galaxy	L/T_{eff}	
LGGS J004505.87+413452.3	702	Andromeda Galaxy	L/T_{eff}	
LGGS J013414.18+305248.0	701–731	Triangulum Galaxy	L/T_{eff}	
LGGS J013402.53+304107.7	701–749	Triangulum Galaxy	L/T_{eff}	
LGGS J013340.80+304248.5	701–814	Triangulum Galaxy	L/T_{eff}	
LGGS J013312.59+303252.5	701	Triangulum Galaxy	L/T_{eff}	
The following well-known stars are listed for the purpose of comparison.
Var 83	150	Triangulum Galaxy	L/T_{eff}	A luminous blue variable and one of the most luminous stars in M33.

=== Other galaxies (within the Local Group) ===
List of the largest known stars in other galaxies (within the Local Group)
Star name	Solar radius (R_{☉})	Galaxy	Method	Notes
NGC 6822-52	1,053	NGC 6822	L/T_{eff}	
Sextans A 10	995±130	Sextans A	L/T_{eff}	
NGC 6822-RSG 19	928	NGC 6822	L/T_{eff}	
WLM 02	883+284 −167	WLM	L/T_{eff}	
Sextans A 5	870±145	Sextans A	L/T_{eff}	
NGC 6822-RSG 26	866	NGC 6822	L/T_{eff}	
NGC 6822-70	860	NGC 6822	L/T_{eff}	
NGC 6822-RSG 12	837	NGC 6822	L/T_{eff}	
NGC 6822-55	830	NGC 6822	L/T_{eff}	
NGC 6822-103	787	NGC 6822	L/T_{eff}	
Leo A 7	785	Leo A	L/T_{eff}	
IC 10-26089	769	IC 10	L/T_{eff}	
NGC 6822-RSG 9	763	NGC 6822	L/T_{eff}	
NGC 6822-RSG 6	712	NGC 6822	L/T_{eff}	
Sextans A 7	710±100	Sextans A	L/T_{eff}	
The following well-known stars are listed for the purpose of comparison.
AT 2018akx	211	NGC 3109	L/T_{eff}	It is a LBV, and is the second brightest star in NGC 3109.
NGC 6822-WR 12	3.79	NGC 6822	L/T_{eff}	A Wolf-Rayet star, one of the hottest known stars.

=== Outside the Local Group (inside the Virgo supercluster) ===
List of the largest known stars in galaxies outside the Local Group inside the Virgo supercluster
Star name	Solar radius (R_{☉})	Galaxy	Group	Method	Notes
NGC 300-125	1,504+176 −157	NGC 300	NGC 55 Group	L/T_{eff}	Effective temperature is based on Titanium(II) oxide lines, which often results in lower values, therefore increasing the radius.
NGC 247-154	1,503+79 −75	NGC 247	Sculptor Group	L/T_{eff}	Effective temperature is based on Titanium(II) oxide lines, which often results in lower values, therefore increasing the radius.
NGC 7793-34	1,392+157 −160	NGC 7793	Sculptor Group	L/T_{eff}	Effective temperature is based on Titanium(II) oxide lines, which often results in lower values, therefore increasing the radius.
NGC 55-40	1,286 ^{+116}_{−106}	NGC 55	NGC 55 Group	L/T_{eff}	Effective temperature is based on Titanium(II) oxide lines, which often results in lower values, therefore increasing the radius.
NGC 2403 V14	1,260	NGC 2403	M81 Group	L/T_{eff}	A F-type S Doradus variable.
NGC 300-154	1,200 ^{+123}_{−111}	NGC 300	NGC 55 Group	L/T_{eff}	Effective temperature is based on Titanium(II) oxide lines, which often results in lower values, therefore increasing the radius.
NGC 300-114	1,181 ^{+123}_{−111}	NGC 300	NGC 55 Group	L/T_{eff}	Effective temperature is based on Titanium(II) oxide lines, which often results in lower values, therefore increasing the radius.
NGC 300-199	1,181 ^{+120}_{−109}	NGC 300	NGC 55 Group	L/T_{eff}	Effective temperature is based on Titanium(II) oxide lines, which often results in lower values, therefore increasing the radius.
NGC 300-153	1,173 ^{+120}_{−109}	NGC 300	NGC 55 Group	L/T_{eff}	Effective temperature is based on Titanium(II) oxide lines, which often results in lower values, therefore increasing the radius.
NGC 300-150	1,167 ^{+119}_{−107}	NGC 300	NGC 55 Group	L/T_{eff}	Effective temperature is based on Titanium(II) oxide lines, which often results in lower values, therefore increasing the radius.
NGC 253-2006	1,167 ^{+75}_{−70}	Sculptor Galaxy	Sculptor Group	L/T_{eff}	Effective temperature is based on Titanium(II) oxide lines, which often results in lower values, therefore increasing the radius.
SPIRITS 14atl	1,134–1,477	Messier 83	Centaurus A/M83 Group	L/T_{eff}	
NGC 300-59	1,133 ^{+146}_{−129}	NGC 300	NGC 55 Group	L/T_{eff}	Effective temperature is based on Titanium(II) oxide lines, which often results in lower values, therefore increasing the radius.
NGC 7793-86	1,127 ^{+94}_{−109}	NGC 7793	Sculptor Group	L/T_{eff}	Effective temperature is based on Titanium(II) oxide lines, which often results in lower values, therefore increasing the radius.
NGC 300-263	1,108 ^{+113}_{−102}	NGC 300	NGC 55 Group	L/T_{eff}	Effective temperature is based on Titanium(II) oxide lines, which often results in lower values, therefore increasing the radius.
NGC 247-447	1,101 ^{+58}_{−56}	NGC 247	Sculptor Group	L/T_{eff}	Effective temperature is based on Titanium(II) oxide lines, which often results in lower values, therefore increasing the radius.
SPIRITS 15ahp	1,098	NGC 2403	M81 Group	L/T_{eff}	
NGC 300-240	1,088 ^{+112}_{−101}	NGC 300	NGC 55 Group	L/T_{eff}	Effective temperature is based on Titanium(II) oxide lines, which often results in lower values, therefore increasing the radius.
NGC 7793-86	1,078 ^{+69}_{−64}	NGC 7793	Sculptor Group	L/T_{eff}	Effective temperature is based on Titanium(II) oxide lines, which often results in lower values, therefore increasing the radius.
NGC 300-173	1,063 ^{+84}_{−77}	NGC 300	NGC 55 Group	L/T_{eff}	Effective temperature is based on Titanium(II) oxide lines, which often results in lower values, therefore increasing the radius.
NGC 300-340	1,036 ^{+105}_{−95}	NGC 300	NGC 55 Group	L/T_{eff}	Effective temperature is based on Titanium(II) oxide lines, which often results in lower values, therefore increasing the radius.
NGC 300-346	1,023 ^{+139}_{−128}	NGC 300	NGC 55 Group	L/T_{eff}	Effective temperature is based on Titanium(II) oxide lines, which often results in lower values, therefore increasing the radius.
NGC 247-533	1,004 ^{+66}_{−62}	NGC 247	Sculptor Group	L/T_{eff}	Effective temperature is based on Titanium(II) oxide lines, which often results in lower values, therefore increasing the radius.
NGC 300-351	992 ^{+115}_{−102}	NGC 300	NGC 55 Group	L/T_{eff}	Effective temperature is based on Titanium(II) oxide lines, which often results in lower values, therefore increasing the radius.
NGC 300-524	987 ^{+77}_{−72}	NGC 300	NGC 55 Group	L/T_{eff}	Effective temperature is based on Titanium(II) oxide lines, which often results in lower values, therefore increasing the radius.
NGC 55-135	964 ^{+99}_{−89}	NGC 55	NGC 55 Group	L/T_{eff}	Effective temperature is based on Titanium(II) oxide lines, which often results in lower values, therefore increasing the radius.
NGC 55-93	955 ^{+49}_{−47}	NGC 55	NGC 55 Group	L/T_{eff}	Effective temperature is based on Titanium(II) oxide lines, which often results in lower values, therefore increasing the radius.
NGC 7793-539	948	NGC 7793	Sculptor Group	L/T_{eff}	Effective temperature is based on Titanium(II) oxide lines, which often results in lower values, therefore increasing the radius.
NGC 55-87	948 ^{+109}_{−98}	NGC 55	NGC 55 Group	L/T_{eff}	Effective temperature is based on Titanium(II) oxide lines, which often results in lower values, therefore increasing the radius.
NGC 55-146	921 ^{+49}_{−46}	NGC 55	NGC 55 Group	L/T_{eff}	Effective temperature is based on Titanium(II) oxide lines, which often results in lower values, therefore increasing the radius.
NGC 300-273	921 ^{+94}_{−85}	NGC 300	NGC 55 Group	L/T_{eff}	Effective temperature is based on Titanium(II) oxide lines, which often results in lower values, therefore increasing the radius.
NGC 300-186	915 ^{+72}_{−65}	NGC 300	NGC 55 Group	L/T_{eff}	Effective temperature is based on Titanium(II) oxide lines, which often results in lower values, therefore increasing the radius.
NGC 55-200	905 ^{+59}_{−55}	NGC 55	NGC 55 Group	L/T_{eff}	Effective temperature is based on Titanium(II) oxide lines, which often results in lower values, therefore increasing the radius.
NGC 55-152	895 ^{+58}_{−54}	NGC 55	NGC 55 Group	L/T_{eff}	Effective temperature is based on Titanium(II) oxide lines, which often results in lower values, therefore increasing the radius.
NGC 300-413	861 ^{+66}_{−61}	NGC 300	NGC 55 Group	L/T_{eff}	Effective temperature is based on Titanium(II) oxide lines, which often results in lower values, therefore increasing the radius.
NGC 55-174	856 ^{+65}_{−61}	NGC 55	NGC 55 Group	L/T_{eff}	Effective temperature is based on Titanium(II) oxide lines, which often results in lower values, therefore increasing the radius.
M81 10584-25-2	851	Messier 81	M81 Group	L/T_{eff}	A yellow hypergiant.
M81 10584-13-3	843	Messier 81	M81 Group	L/T_{eff}	A yellow hypergiant.
NGC 55-75	836 ^{+81}_{−111}	NGC 55	NGC 55 Group	L/T_{eff}	Effective temperature is based on Titanium(II) oxide lines, which often results in lower values, therefore increasing the radius.
NGC 300-545	824 ^{+104}_{−93}	NGC 300	NGC 55 Group	L/T_{eff}	Effective temperature is based on Titanium(II) oxide lines, which often results in lower values, therefore increasing the radius.
NGC 247-2912	821 ^{+54}_{−51}	NGC 247	Sculptor Group	L/T_{eff}	Effective temperature is based on Titanium(II) oxide lines, which often results in lower values, therefore increasing the radius.
NGC 55-216	801 ^{+102}_{−89}	NGC 55	NGC 55 Group	L/T_{eff}	Effective temperature is based on Titanium(II) oxide lines, which often results in lower values, therefore increasing the radius.
NGC 247-1471	798 ^{+52}_{−48}	NGC 247	Sculptor Group	L/T_{eff}	Effective temperature is based on Titanium(II) oxide lines, which often results in lower values, therefore increasing the radius.
NGC 300-499	796 ^{+89}_{−108}	NGC 300	NGC 55 Group	L/T_{eff}	Effective temperature is based on Titanium(II) oxide lines, which often results in lower values, therefore increasing the radius.
NGC 300-379	744 ^{+56}_{−52}	NGC 300	NGC 55 Group	L/T_{eff}	Effective temperature is based on Titanium(II) oxide lines, which often results in lower values, therefore increasing the radius.
NGC 300-838	744 ^{+57}_{−53}	NGC 300	NGC 55 Group	L/T_{eff}	Effective temperature is based on Titanium(II) oxide lines, which often results in lower values, therefore increasing the radius.
NGC 55-149	738 ^{+47}_{−55}	NGC 55	NGC 55 Group	L/T_{eff}	Effective temperature is based on Titanium(II) oxide lines, which often results in lower values, therefore increasing the radius.
NGC 55-194	730 ^{+46}_{−44}	NGC 55	NGC 55 Group	L/T_{eff}	Effective temperature is based on Titanium(II) oxide lines, which often results in lower values, therefore increasing the radius.
[GKE2015] 7	729	NGC 300	NGC 55 Group	L/T_{eff}	
NGC 55-270	728 ^{+38}_{−36}	NGC 55	NGC 55 Group	L/T_{eff}	Effective temperature is based on Titanium(II) oxide lines, which often results in lower values, therefore increasing the radius.
NGC 300-1047	724 ^{+65}_{−59}	NGC 300	NGC 55 Group	L/T_{eff}	Effective temperature is based on Titanium(II) oxide lines, which often results in lower values, therefore increasing the radius.
NGC 247-3231	719 ^{+56}_{−51}	NGC 247	Sculptor Group	L/T_{eff}	Effective temperature is based on Titanium(II) oxide lines, which often results in lower values, therefore increasing the radius.
NGC 247-2966	719 ^{+56}_{−52}	NGC 247	Sculptor Group	L/T_{eff}	Effective temperature is based on Titanium(II) oxide lines, which often results in lower values, therefore increasing the radius.
NGC 55-245	717 ^{+55}_{−50}	NGC 55	NGC 55 Group	L/T_{eff}	Effective temperature is based on Titanium(II) oxide lines, which often results in lower values, therefore increasing the radius.
NGC 300-1068	716 ^{+64}_{−58}	NGC 300	NGC 55 Group	L/T_{eff}	Effective temperature is based on Titanium(II) oxide lines, which often results in lower values, therefore increasing the radius.
NGC 300-1081	712 ^{+54}_{−51}	NGC 300	NGC 55 Group	L/T_{eff}	Effective temperature is based on Titanium(II) oxide lines, which often results in lower values, therefore increasing the radius.
The following well-known stars are listed for the purpose of comparison.
Holmberg IX V1 A	337	Holmberg IX	M81 Group	L/T_{eff}	Primary star of a yellow supergiant contact binary.
Holmberg IX V1 B	306	Holmberg IX	M81 Group	L/T_{eff}	Secondary star of a yellow supergiant contact binary.
NGC 2363-V1	194–356	NGC 2366	M81 Group	L/T_{eff}	

=== Outside the Virgo supercluster ===
Note that this list does not include the candidate JWST dark stars, with estimated radii of up to 61 astronomical units (13,000 R_{☉}) or quasi-stars candidates, which have estimated radii of ~1,000 astronomical units (220,000 R_{☉}).

Star name	Solar radius (R_{☉})	Galaxy	Group	Method	Notes
W2 A	1,182	Warhol Arc	MACS J0416.1-2403	L/T_{eff}	W2 A is the primary star in a binary system consisting of a red supergiant and a B-type supergiant, located at redshift z = 0.94.
Quyllur	965		ACT-CL J0102-4915	L/T_{eff}	Likely the first red supergiant star at cosmological distances and is also discovered by James Webb Space Telescope.
The following well-known stars are listed for the purpose of comparison.
Godzilla	430–2,365	Sunburst galaxy	PSZ1 G311.65-18.48	L/T_{eff}	The most luminous known star.
Mothra	271	LS1	MACS J0416.1-2403	L/T_{eff}	A binary star at cosmological distances.

=== Transient events ===
During some transient events, such as red novae or LBV eruptions the star's radius can increase by a significant amount.

List of largest stars during transient events
Star or transient event name	Solar radius (R_{☉})	Year	Galaxy	Group	Method	Notes
AT 2017jfs	>33,000	2017	NGC 4470		L/T_{eff}	
SNhunt151	16,700	2014	UGC 3165	LDC 331	L/T_{eff}	
SN 2015bh	16,400±2,600	2015	NGC 2770	LDC 616	L/T_{eff}	
AT 2021biy	13,400±3,500	2022	NGC 4631	NGC 4631 Group	L/T_{eff}	
AT 2018hso	10,350	2018	NGC 3729	M109 Group	L/T_{eff}	
M101 OT2015-1	7,800	2015	Pinwheel Galaxy	M101 Group	L/T_{eff}	
AT 2023clx	6,800	2023	NGC 3799	nest 101314	L/T_{eff}	
M51 OT2019-1	5,500	2019	Whirlpool Galaxy	M51 Group	L/T_{eff}	
η Carinae	4,319 – 6,032	1845	Milky Way	Local Group	L/T_{eff}	During the outburst, the star became the second brightest star in sky, reaching an apparent magnitude of between −0.8 and −1.0.
AT 2010dn	4,130	2010	NGC 3180	LDC 743	L/T_{eff}	
SN 2011fh	3,980	2011	NGC 4806	Abell 3528	L/T_{eff}	
AT 2014ej	3,600	2014	NGC 7552	Grus Quartet	L/T_{eff}	
V838 Monocerotis	3,190	2002	Milky Way	Local Group	L/T_{eff}	
SN2008S	3,020	2008	NGC 6946	NGC 6946 Group	L/T_{eff}	
SNhunt120	2,900	2012	NGC 5775	Virgo Cluster	L/T_{eff}	
AT 2017be	2,000	2017	NGC 2537		L/T_{eff}	
M31 RV	2,000	1988	Andromeda Galaxy	Local Group	L/T_{eff}	
PHL 293B star	1,348 – 1,463	2002	PHL 293B		L/T_{eff}	
SNhunt248	~850	2014	NGC 5806	NGC 5846 Group	L/T_{eff}	
SN 2002kg	704	2002	NGC 2403	M81 Group	L/T_{eff}	
R71	500	2012	Large Magellanic Cloud	Local Group	L/T_{eff}	
SN 2000ch	500	2000	NGC 3432	LDC 743	L/T_{eff}	
Godzilla	430 – 2,365	2015	Sunburst galaxy		L/T_{eff}	
AT 2016blu	~330	2012 – 2022	NGC 4559	Coma I Group	L/T_{eff}	19 outbursts were detected between 2012 and 2022. The star was likely relatively stable the decade before since no outbursts were detected from 1999 – 2009.

=== SN Progenitors ===
List of largest supernova progenitors
Star or supernova name	Solar radius (R_{☉})	Year	Galaxy	Group	Method	Notes
SN 2025pht	1,850 ± 340 – 2,620 ± 480	2025	NGC 1637		L/T_{eff}	
N6946-BH1	1,765	2008	NGC 6946	LDC 1412	L/T_{eff}	Not a true supernova, but a failed supernova.
SN 2020xva	1,520	2020	SDSS J173209.23+533908.4		L/T_{eff}	
SN 2019ust	1,440	2019	UGC 548	[TKT2016] 54	L/T_{eff}	
SN 2021ibn	1,200	2021	2MASX J08501445+3701127		L/T_{eff}	
SN 2020afdi	1,200	2020	NGC 5836		L/T_{eff}	
SN 2002hh	1,184-1,904	2002	NGC 6946	LDC 1412	L/T_{eff}	
SN 2018fif	1,174	2018	UGC 85	LGG 485	L/T_{eff}	
SN 1999an	1,131-1,492	1999	IC 755	Virgo Cluster	L/T_{eff}	
SN 2019eoh	1,100±130	2019	IC 4145		L/T_{eff}	
SN 2017eaw	1,000-2,000	2017	NGC 6946	LDC 1412	L/T_{eff}	
SN 2020faa	1,000	2020	2MASS J14470904+7244157		L/T_{eff}	
SN 2023ixf	912+227 −222–1,060±30	2023	Pinwheel galaxy	M101 Group	L/T_{eff}	
SN 2004et	893-976	2004	NGC 6946	LDC 1412	L/T_{eff}	
SN 2019oxn	780±120	2019	SDSS J175113.25+512300.1		L/T_{eff}	
SN 2018aoq	742	2018	NGC 4151	LDC 867	L/T_{eff}	
NGC3021-CANDIDATE-1	722	2005	NGC 3021	LDC 676	L/T_{eff}	Not a true supernova and was a failed supernova.
SN 1999br	717-945	1999	NGC 4900	Virgo Cluster	L/T_{eff}	
SN 2020jfo	700±10	2020	Messier 61	Virgo Cluster	L/T_{eff}	

== Largest stars by apparent size ==
The following list include the largest stars by their apparent size (angular diameter) as seen from Earth. The unit of measurement is the milliarcsecond (mas), equivalent to 10^{−3} arcseconds. Stars with angular diameters larger than 13 milliarcseconds are included.

List of largest stars by apparent size (angular diameter)
Name	Angular diameter (mas)	Angular diameter type (Note: Legend: UD=Uniform disk diameter LD=Limb-darkened diameter Ross=Rosseland diameter Est = Estimated using distance and physical radius)	Distance (light-years)	Spectral type	Notes
Sun	2,000,000		0.000016	G2V	The largest star by angular diameter.
R Doradus	51.18±1.24	LD	179±10	M8III:e	The largest star by angular diameter apart from the Sun.
Betelgeuse (α Orionis)	42.28±0.43	LD	408–540^{+98}_{−49}	M1-M2Ia-Iab	
Antares (α Scorpii A)	37.31±0.09	LD	553.5±93.9	M1.5Iab	
Mira (ο Ceti)	28.9±0.3 – 34.9±0.4	Ross	299±33	M5-M9IIIe	The angular diameter vary during Mira's pulsations.
Tiaki (β Gruis)	28.8±0.6	?	177±4	M4.5III	
Gacrux (γ Crucis)	24.7	?	88.6±0.4	M3.5III	
Rasalgethi (α Herculis)	23.95±5.03	Est	359±52	M5Ib-II	
R Hydrae	23.7±1	?	482±33	M6-9e	
Arcturus (α Boötis)	21.06±0.17	LD	36.8	K1.5IIIFe-0.5	
π^{1} Gruis	21	?	535	S5,7	
Aldebaran (α Tauri)	20.58–21.1	LD	65.3±1	K5+III	
GY Aquilae	20.46	?	1108±98	M8	
θ Apodis	18.1	?	389±17	M6.5III	
R Lyrae	18.016±0.224	LD	310^{+10}_{−7}	M4.5III	
Scheat (β Pegasi)	16.75±0.24	Ross	196±2	M2.5II-III	
Gorgonea Tertia (ρ Persei)	16.555±0.166	LD	308±7	M4+IIIa	
SW Virginis	16.11±0.13–16.8±0.34	UD	527±46.9	M7III:	
R Aquarii	15.61±0.8 – 16.59±1.03	LD	711^{+39}_{−36}	M6.5–M8.5e	
g Herculis	15.2±0.5 – 19.09±0.19	LD	385±10	M6-III	
RS Cancri	15.1±0.5 – 17.2±0.4	LD	490±40	M6S	
Tejat (μ Geminorum)	15.118±0.151	LD	230±10	M3IIIab	
R Leonis Minoris	14.4±0.87	LD	942^{+33}_{−47}	M6.5-9e	
S Cephei	14.29±2.28	LD	1591^{+49}_{−46}	C7,3e	
T Cassiopeiae	14.22±0.73	LD	893^{+49}_{−46}	M7-9e	
μ Cephei (Herschel's Garnet Star)	14.11±0.60		1370^{+190}_{−140}	M2Ia	
Mirach (β Andromedae)	13.749±0.137	LD	199±9	M0+IIIa	
Menkar (α Ceti)	13.238±0.056	LD	249±8	M1.5IIIa	Other measurements include 12.2±0.04 mas.
V Cygni	13.1±0.208 – 14.84±2.37	LD	1747^{+163}_{−137}	C7,4eJ	

== See also ==
- Constellation
- Lists of stars
- List of most massive stars
- List of most luminous stars
- List of hottest stars
- List of coolest stars
- List of smallest known stars
- List of most massive black holes
- List of largest nebulae
- List of largest galaxies
- List of largest cosmic structures
- List of largest exoplanets
- List of star extremes
- Star
