= HD 300933 =

M-type supergiant in the constellation Vela

- Location of HD 300933 (circled)

Observation data Epoch J2000 Equinox J2000
- Constellation: Vela
- Right ascension: 10^{h} 38^{m} 02.98879^{s}
- Declination: −56° 49′ 01.9334″
- Apparent magnitude (V): 8.29

Characteristics
- Evolutionary stage: Red supergiant
- Spectral type: M2 Iab/Ib + B2V
- B−V color index: +1.70
- J−H color index: +1.097
- J−K color index: +1.500

Astrometry
Radial velocity (R_{v})	−11.05±0.42 km/s
Proper motion (μ)	RA: −7.461 mas/yr Dec.: 3.539 mas/yr
Parallax (π)	0.3216±0.0315 mas
Distance	3100 pc

Details

HD 300933
Radius	806 R_{☉}
Temperature	3660±170 K

Other designations
- CD−56°3464, CPD−56°3586, Gaia DR3 5352006438862476288, HD 300933/4, WDS J10380-5649AB, TIC 458199516, TYC 8609-2644-1, GSC 08609-02644, IRAS 10360-5633, 2MASS J10380298-5649019, WISE J103803.02-564901.9

Database references
SIMBAD	data

HD 300933 (CPD-56°3586) is a red supergiant of spectral type M2 Iab/Ib in the southern constellation of Vela, close to the border with Carina. With an apparent magnitude of 8.29, it is too faint to be observed by the naked eye, but can be seen through binoculars. It is part of a binary system with a massive B-type main-sequence star (spectral type B2V) designated HD 300934. It is located roughly 3,100 parsecs (10,000 light-years) away from the Solar System, but is approaching at a heliocentric radial velocity of −11.05±0.42 km/s.

== Stellar properties ==
The binary HD 300933/4 is a probable VV Cephei-type star with a composite spectrum similar to that of V381 Cephei (HR 8164), but with weaker emission lines of Fe II, S II, and Ni II (the "II" indicates that the elements are in their singly ionized state in spectroscopic notation). A detailed analysis of the pair was first conducted in 1970, which yielded an absolute magnitude of −5.3 and −2.5 in the V band for HD 300933 and HD 300934, respectively, albeit this was calculated using a distance smaller than modern estimates, at 2,500 parsecs (8,200 light-years). With an updated value of 3100 pc, its K_{S} band absolute magnitude is gauged at −10.8.

HD 300933 displays infrared emissions that imply the existence of circumstellar dust at a temperature of 600 K (327 °C; 620 °F). Despite this, the system shows no signs of ultraviolet extinction or reddening, meaning that the light path from the B star does not cross the wind from the supergiant component. This is thought to be either due to an inclined orbit or an unfavorable orbital phase when it was observed in 1987.

The star is thought to be among the largest stars, though its precise size is highly uncertain; a radius of 806 R_{☉} can be calculated from the luminosity and effective temperature provided by Healy et al. (2023), whereas Messineo et al. (2019) gives a much smaller estimate of 462 R_{☉} (though they use a far smaller distance of 1574 or 1585 pc, which is inconsistent with the Gaia EDR3 parallax of 0.3216±0.0315 mas).
