= GCIRS 7 =

Star in the constellation Sagittarius

- GCIRS 7 is the brightest star in the center of this image. Credit: HST

Observation data Epoch J2000.0 Equinox J2000.0 (ICRS)
- Constellation: Sagittarius
- Right ascension: 17^{h} 45^{m} 39.987^{s}
- Declination: −29° 00′ 22.24″

Characteristics
- Evolutionary stage: RSG
- Spectral type: M1I
- Apparent magnitude (J): 14.197±0.137
- Apparent magnitude (H): 9.260±0.118
- Apparent magnitude (K): 6.503±0.017

Details
Mass	20 – 25 M_{☉}
Radius	1,170±60 R_{☉}
Luminosity	189,000+42,000 −35,000 L_{☉}
Surface gravity (log g)	−0.6 cgs
Temperature	3,600±195 or 3,400 K
Metallicity [Fe/H]	−0.02 dex
Age	6.5 – 10 Myr

Other designations
- GCIRS 7, Galactic Center IRS 7, Sgr A IRS 7, TIC 321993603, AP J17454004-2900225, 2MASS J17454004-2900225

Database references
SIMBAD	data

GCIRS 7 is a pulsating red supergiant star located in the Galactic Center of the Milky Way galaxy. It is very luminous with a luminosity of 189,000 Sun's (L_{☉}). It is also one of the largest stars currently discovered in the galactic center with a size about 1,170 solar radii (R_{☉}). If it was placed in the Solar System, its photosphere would engulf the orbit of Jupiter. The outer layers of the atmosphere are being blown away from stellar winds of the central cluster, with a very high mass loss rate of 1×10^{−4} times the Sun's mass per year (M_{☉}), both one of the highest for any star and almost comparable to OH/IR red hypergiants VY Canis Majoris and NML Cygni. This forms a cometary tail north of the star. It formed some 6.5 to 10 million years ago together with many of the massive stars in the galactic center.

== See also ==
- KW Sagittarii, another red supergiant in Sagittarius
- VX Sagittarii, another heavily mass-losing pulsating red supergiant (or hypergiant) in Sagittarius
