= V355 Cephei =

Star in the constellation Cepheus

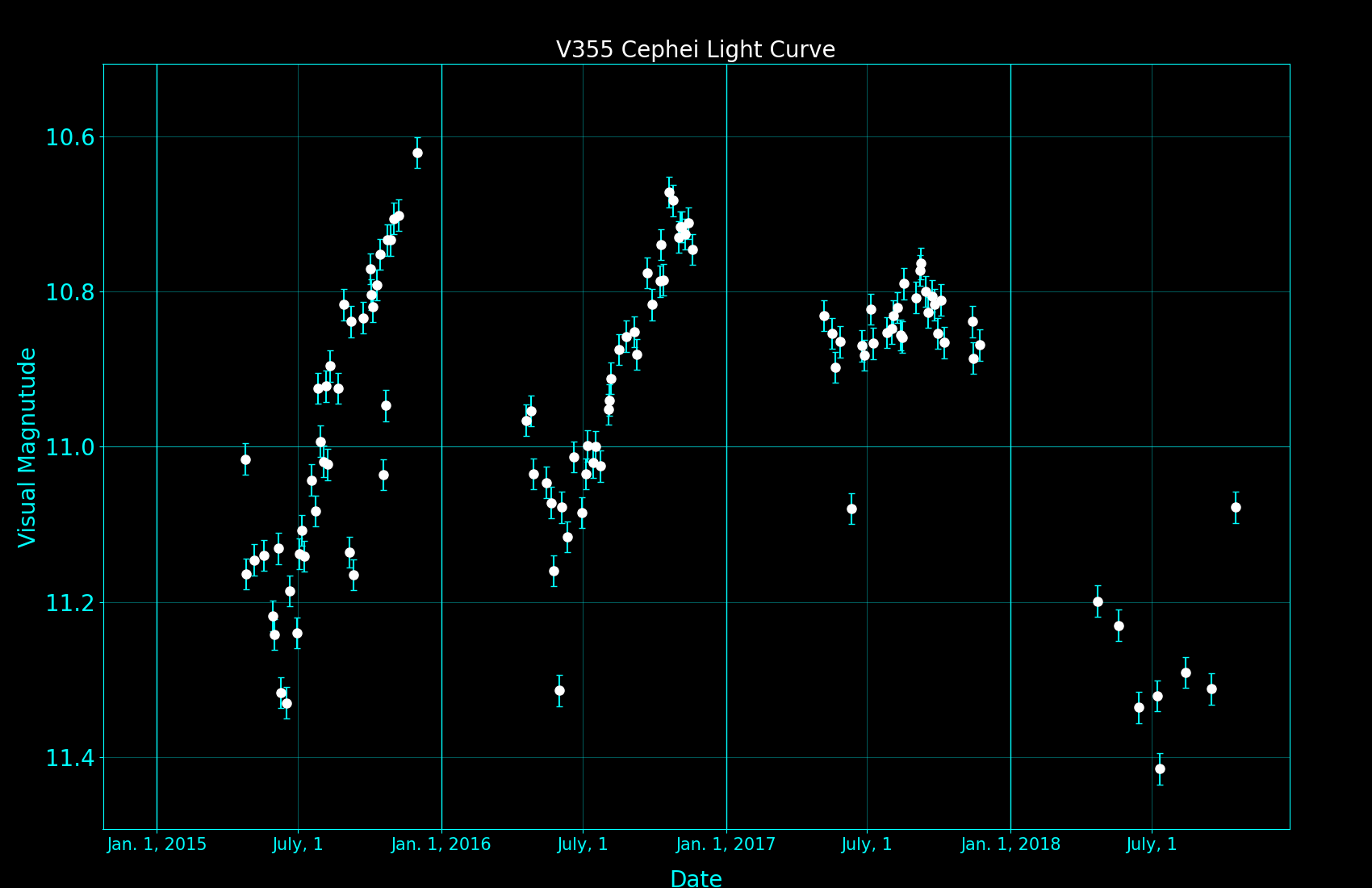
- Light curve for V355 Cephei plotted from ASAS-SN data

Observation data Epoch J2000.0 Equinox J2000.0
- Constellation: Cepheus
- Right ascension: 22^{h} 49^{m} 10.47^{s}
- Declination: +59° 18′ 13.0″
- Apparent magnitude (V): 10.55 - 11.4

Characteristics
- Spectral type: M2Iab
- Variable type: LC

Astrometry
Radial velocity (R_{v})	−64.29±0.61 km/s
Proper motion (μ)	RA: −3.158 mas/yr Dec.: −2.017 mas/yr
Parallax (π)	0.2244±0.0289 mas
Distance	approx. 15,000 ly (approx. 4,500 pc)
Absolute magnitude (M_{V})	−6.1

Details
Radius	770±154 – 790 R_{☉}
Luminosity	106,000 L_{☉}
Surface gravity (log g)	−0.1 cgs
Temperature	3,660 K

Other designations
- IRC +60367, V355 Cep, 2MASS J22491046+5918129

Database references
SIMBAD	data

V355 Cephei is a red supergiant located in the constellation of Cepheus. It has a radius between 770±154 and 790 solar radii, making it one of the largest known stars. It is a slow irregular variable with an apparent magnitude that ranges between 10.55 - 11.4.
