= MZ Puppis =

Red supergiant star in the constellation of Puppis

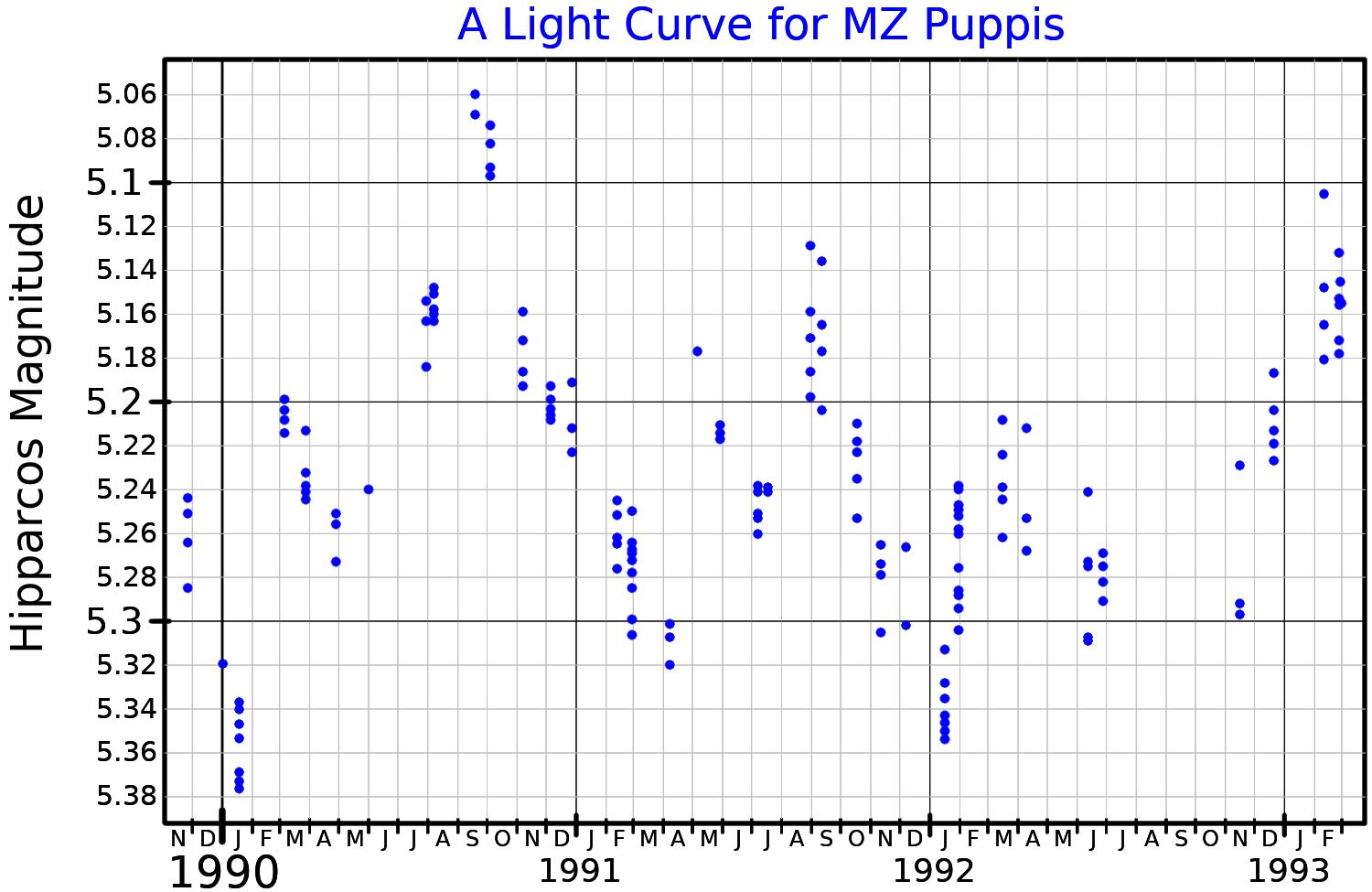
- A light curve for MZ Puppis, plotted from Hipparcos data

Observation data Epoch J2000.0 Equinox J2000.0
- Constellation: Puppis
- Right ascension: 08^{h} 04^{m} 16.19^{s}
- Declination: −32° 40′ 29.4″
- Apparent magnitude (V): 5.20 - 5.44

Characteristics
- Evolutionary stage: Red supergiant
- Spectral type: M1Iab-Ib
- Variable type: LC?

Astrometry
Radial velocity (R_{v})	+35.90 km/s
Proper motion (μ)	RA: −5.736 mas/yr Dec.: +6.830 mas/yr
Parallax (π)	0.8126±0.1013 mas
Distance	approx. 4,000 ly (approx. 1,200 pc)
Absolute magnitude (M_{V})	−4.8

Details
Mass	14 M_{☉}
Radius	400 R_{☉}
Luminosity	26,550 - 28,580 L_{☉}
Surface gravity (log g)	−0.92 cgs
Temperature	3,745±170 K
Age	25 Myr

Database references
SIMBAD	data

MZ Puppis is a red supergiant star in the constellation of Puppis. It has a radius of 400 R_{☉} and a mass of 14 solar masses, similar to Betelgeuse.
