= XX Persei =

Star in the constellation Perseus

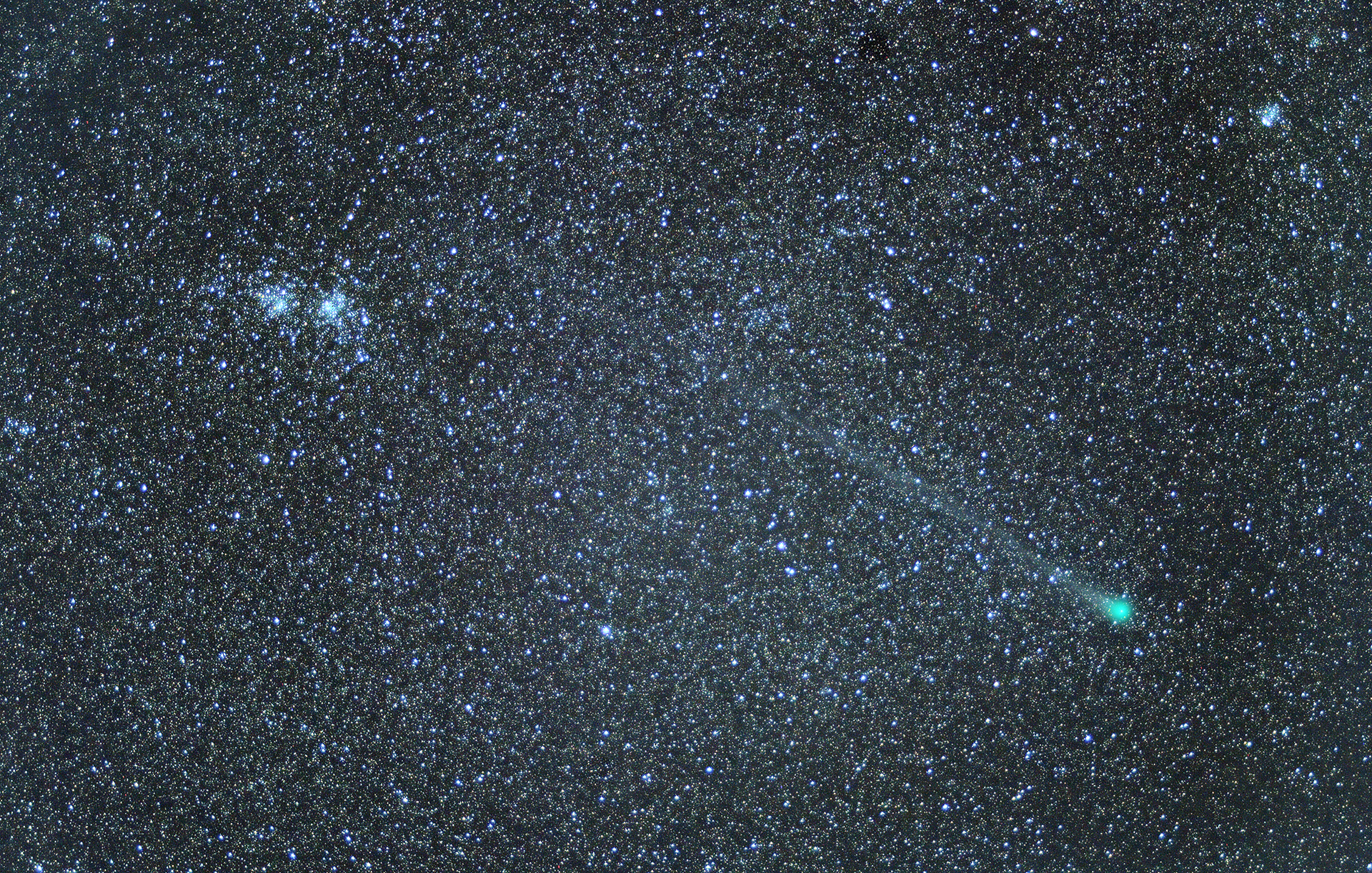
- XX Persei (circled) near the Double Cluster and Comet Lovejoy; Credit: Juan lacruz

Observation data Epoch J2000 Equinox ICRS
- Constellation: Perseus
- Right ascension: 02^{h} 03^{m} 09.35854^{s}
- Declination: +55° 13′ 56.6229″
- Apparent magnitude (V): 7.9 - 9.0

Characteristics
- Evolutionary stage: Red supergiant
- Spectral type: M4Ib + B7V
- Variable type: SRc

Astrometry
Proper motion (μ)	RA: −1.263 mas/yr Dec.: −1.819 mas/yr
Parallax (π)	0.3980±0.0316 mas
Distance	6,614+1,060 −812 ly (2,029+325 −249 pc)
Absolute magnitude (M_{V})	−4.6

Details
Mass	16 M_{☉}
Radius	718+80 −56 R_{☉}
Luminosity	42,000 L_{☉}
Temperature	3,339 K

Other designations
- XX Per, BD+54°444, GSC 03689-01837, HD 12401, HIP 9582, IRC+50052, 2MASS J02030935+5513566, HV 3414, SAO 22875, AAVSO 0156+54

Database references
SIMBAD	data

XX Persei (IRC +50052 / HIP 9582 / BD+54°444) is a semiregular variable red supergiant star in the constellation Perseus, between the Double Cluster and the border with Andromeda.

== Variability ==
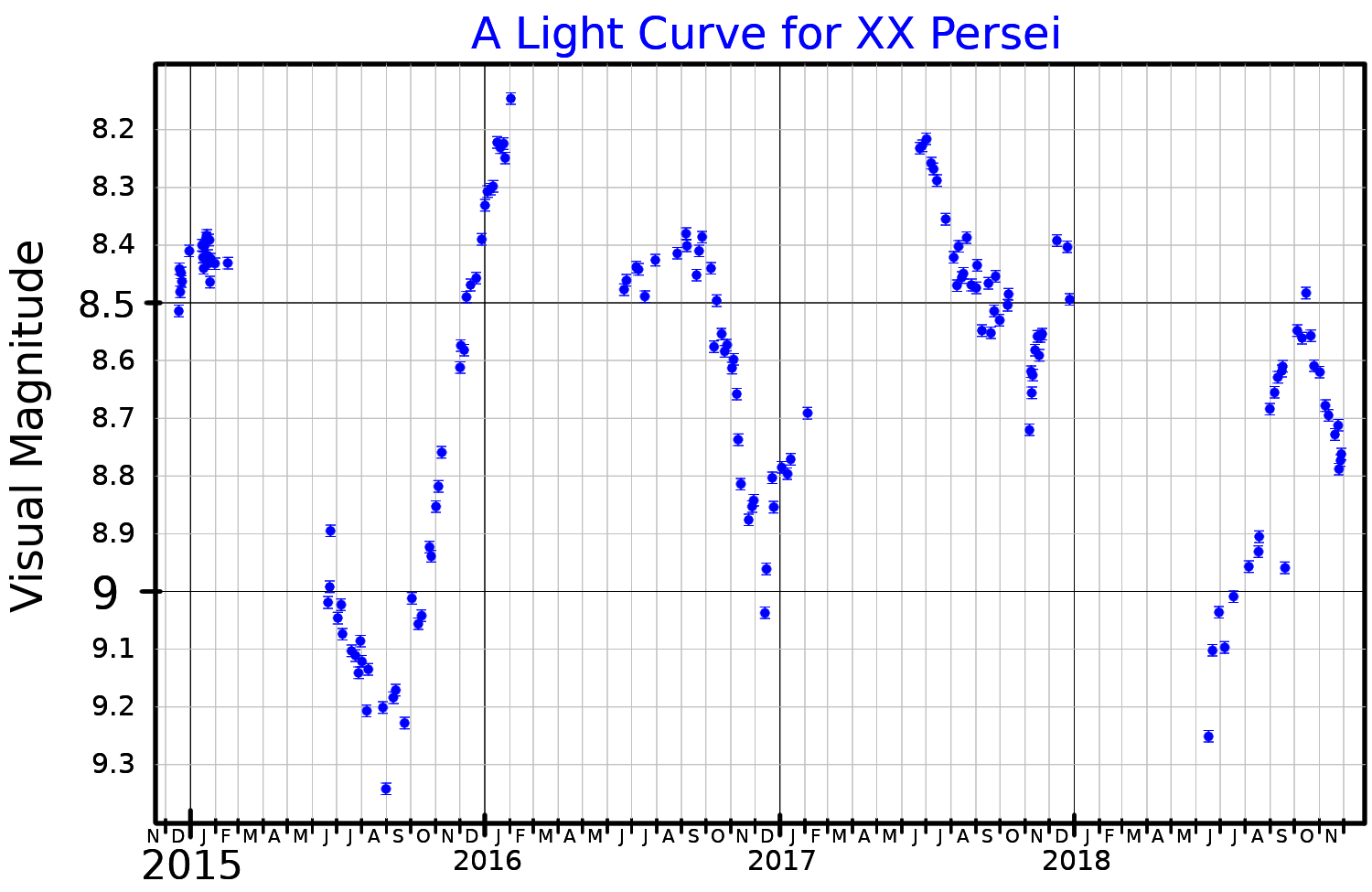
A visual band light curve for XX Persei, plotted from ASAS-SN data

In 1917 it was announced that Ida E. Woods had discovered that this star is a variable star, by examining 520 photographs taken from December 1, 1887 through February 4, 1913. It was given its variable star designation in 1921. XX Persei is a semiregular variable star of sub-type SRc, indicating a cool supergiant. The General Catalogue of Variable Stars gives the period as 415 days. It also shows a long secondary period which was originally given at 4,100 days. A more recent study shows only slow variations with a period of 3,150 ± 1,000 days. Another study failed to find any long period up to 10,000 days.

== Distance ==
The most likely distance of XX Per is 2,290 pc, from assumed membership of the Perseus OB1 association. Gaia Data Release 3 includes a parallax of 0.3980±0.0316 mas, corresponding to a distance of around 2,500 pc.

== Characteristics ==
XX Per is a red supergiant of spectral type M4Ib with an effective temperature below 4,000 K. It has a large infrared excess, indicating surrounding dust at a temperature of 900 K, but no masers have been detected.

XX Persei has a mass of 16 solar masses, above the limit beyond which stars end their lives as supernovae. This makes XX Persei similar to the more well-known red supergiant Antares.

== Companions ==
XX Persei is listed in multiple star catalogues with a companion of magnitude 9.8 223″ away. This star is BD+54°445 and it is an unrelated foreground object. In addition, the spectrum of XX Persei shows absorption lines of a hot companion too close to be resolved. The combined spectral type has been given as M4Ib + B7V, while the UV spectrum of the companion has been used to derive a spectral classification of A.

== See also ==
- RS Persei
- S Persei
