= Titanium(II) oxide =

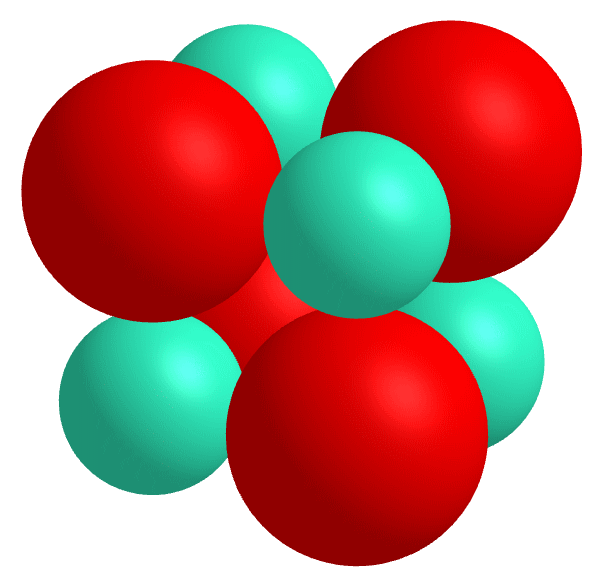
- Titanium(II) oxide

Names
- IUPAC name Titanium(II) oxide
- Other names Titanium monoxide

Identifiers
CAS Number	12137-20-1
3D model (JSmol)	Interactive image
ChEBI	CHEBI:134455
ChemSpider	8466200
ECHA InfoCard	100.032.020
EC Number	235-236-5
PubChem CID	61685
CompTox Dashboard (EPA)	DTXSID7065253
- InChI: InChI=1S/O.Ti/q-2;+2 Key: VKRWBTVMYISSEF-UHFFFAOYSA-N; InChI=1S/O.Ti Key: OGIDPMRJRNCKJF-UHFFFAOYSA-N
- SMILES: [O-2].[Ti+2]

Properties
Chemical formula	TiO
Molar mass	63.866 g/mol
Appearance	bronze crystals
Density	4.95 g/cm^{3}
Melting point	1,750 °C (3,180 °F; 2,020 K)

Structure
Crystal structure	cubic

Hazards
Flash point	Non-flammable

Related compounds
Related titanium oxides	Titanium(III) oxide Titanium(III,IV) oxide Titanium(IV) oxide
- Except where otherwise noted, data are given for materials in their standard state (at 25 °C [77 °F], 100 kPa). verify (what is ?) Infobox references

Titanium(II) oxide (TiO) is an inorganic chemical compound of titanium and oxygen. It can be prepared from titanium dioxide and titanium metal at 1500 °C. It is non-stoichiometric in a range TiO_{0.7} to TiO_{1.3} and this is caused by vacancies of either Ti or O in the defect rock salt structure. In pure TiO 15% of both Ti and O sites are vacant, as the vacancies allow metal-metal bonding between adjacent Ti centres. Careful annealing can cause ordering of the vacancies producing a monoclinic form which has 5 TiO units in the primitive cell that exhibits lower resistivity. A high temperature form with titanium atoms with trigonal prismatic coordination is also known. Acid solutions of TiO are stable for a short time then decompose to give hydrogen:

2 Ti^{2+}(aq) + 2 H^{+}(aq) → 2 Ti^{3+}(aq) + H_{2}(g)

Gas-phase TiO shows strong bands in the optical spectra of cool (M-type) stars. In 2017, TiO was claimed to be detected in an exoplanet atmosphere for the first time; a result which is still debated in the literature. Additionally, evidence has been obtained for the presence of the diatomic molecule TiO in the interstellar medium.
