= SW Virginis =

Star in the constellation Virgo

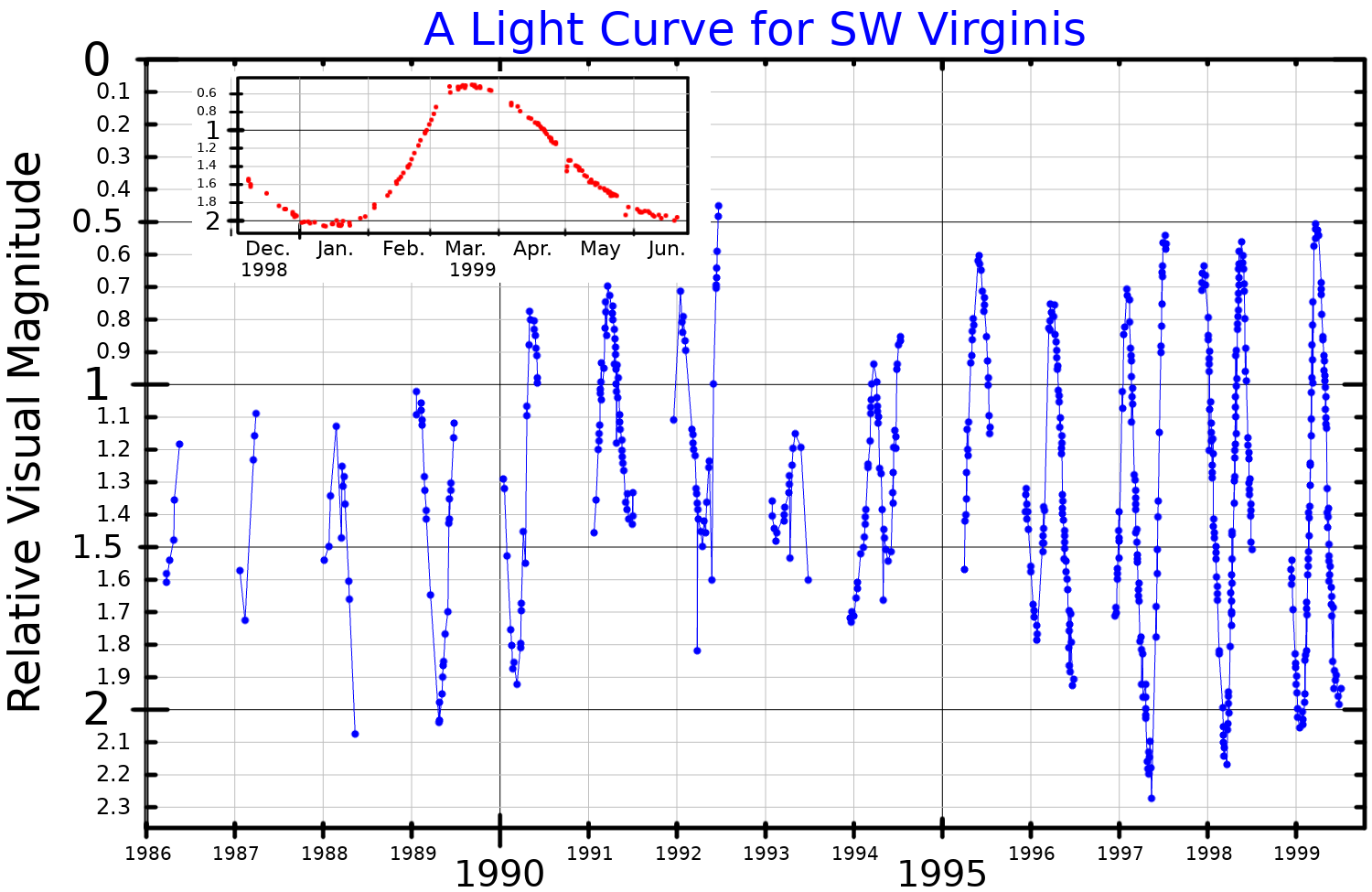
- A visual band light curve for SW Virginis, adapted from Percy et al. (2001)

Observation data Epoch J2000.0 Equinox ICRS
- Constellation: Virgo
- Right ascension: 13^{h} 14^{m} 04.383^{s}
- Declination: −02° 48′ 25.13″
- Apparent magnitude (V): 6.65 to 7.95

Characteristics
- Evolutionary stage: AGB
- Spectral type: M7III:
- U−B color index: 0.72
- B−V color index: 1.67
- Variable type: SRb

Astrometry
Radial velocity (R_{v})	−15.78±3.51 km/s
Proper motion (μ)	RA: −35.131 mas/yr Dec.: −2.769 mas/yr
Parallax (π)	5.5526±0.4437 mas
Distance	590 ± 50 ly (180 ± 10 pc)

Details
Mass	1–1.25 M_{☉}
Radius	244±42 R_{☉}
Luminosity	4,500±1,100 L_{☉}
Surface gravity (log g)	−0.3±0.1 cgs
Temperature	3,060±130 K
Metallicity [Fe/H]	~0.0 dex

Other designations
- SW Vir, BD−02°3653, HD 114961, HIP 64569, SAO 139236, PPM 179000

Database references
SIMBAD	data

SW Virginis is a variable star in the equatorial constellation of Virgo, abbreviated SW Vir. It ranges in brightness from an apparent visual magnitude of 6.65 down to 7.95, with a pulsation period of 153.8 days. The star is located at a distance of approximately 590 light years from the Sun based on parallax measurements, but is drifting closer with a radial velocity of −16 km/s. SW Vir is located near the ecliptic and is subject to lunar occultation, which has allowed its angular diameter to be directly measured.

The variability of this star was discovered by W. P. Fleming and announced in 1901, when it was known as BD−02°3653. It was given its variable star designation, SW Virginis, in 1912. The star was initially catalogued as an irregular variable but later was classed as a semi-regular variable of type SRb. The stellar classification of M7III: indicates this is an evolved red giant, with the trailing colon indicating some uncertainty about the classification. In 2003, the isotope ^{99}Tc was detected in the atmosphere of SW Vir. The short lifespan of this element is an indicator that the star is undergoing the third dredge-up during the thermally pulsating phase of the asymptotic giant branch (AGB).

This is an oxygen-rich non-Mira AGB star that is shedding mass at a rate of 4×10^{−7} M_{☉}·yr^{−1}. An infrared excess indicates the star has a circumstellar dust envelope consisting of grains of matter that have condensed out of expelled gas. This dust shell displays an asymmetric appearance. Polarization of light from these dust grains indicate a typical size of less than a μm. The shell's thermal (non-maser) mm-wave spectral line emission from carbon monoxide was detected in 1986, and showed that the circumstellar envelope is expanding at 8.6 km/sec. The spectrum of molecular water has been detected in the star's extended outer atmosphere – out to twice the stellar radius – with a column density of 10^{19}–10^{20} cm^{–2}.
