= Holmberg IX V1 =

Eclipsing contact binary in Holmberg IX

Observation data Epoch J2000.0 Equinox ICRS
- Constellation: Ursa Major
- Right ascension: 09^{h} 57^{m} 37.14^{s}
- Declination: +69° 02′ 11.0″
Apparent magnitude (V)	20.7 (maximum)	

Characteristics

A
- Evolutionary stage: Yellow supergiant
- Spectral type: G

B
- Evolutionary stage: Yellow supergiant
- Spectral type: G

Astrometry
Distance	13 million ly
Absolute magnitude (M_{V})	−7.1

Orbit
Period (P)	270.7 days
Semi-major axis (a)	547 R_{☉}
Eccentricity (e)	0
Inclination (i)	55.7°

Details

A
Mass	15–20 M_{☉}
Temperature	4,800 K
Age	10–15 Myr

B
Mass	15–20 M_{☉}
Temperature	5,040 K
Age	10–15 Myr

Other designations
- EQ J095737+690211

Database references
SIMBAD	data

Holmberg IX V1, also known as EQ J095737+690211, is a W Ursae Majoris type eclipsing contact binary star system in the constellation of Ursa Major. The binary system is located in the dwarf galaxy Holmberg IX, roughly 13 million light-years (or 4 million parsecs) away. The binary system has a maximum visual magnitude of 20.7, and is one of the most extreme and rarest systems discovered.

== Characteristics ==
Holmberg IX V1 was discovered by the Large Binocular Telescope (or the LBT) on Mt. Graham, Arizona, from observations between January and October 2007. In the same variability survey, J. L. Prieto and his team also found a similar contact binary system designated SMC R47 in the Small Magellanic Cloud.

=== Physical properties ===
The binary system is made up of two yellow supergiant stars. These stars are almost identical in their physical properties such as their luminosity, mass, and age. The binary system is important because it helps to determine the progenitors of unusual supernovae such as SN 2004et and SN 2006ov.

The two yellow supergiant stars in this system are both estimated to be approximately 15 to 20 times the mass of the Sun, and are predicted to be 10 to 15 million years old. The two stars in this binary system are classified as G-type yellow supergiants, and they both were originally O-type main-sequence stars with initial masses of 30 times more massive than the Sun.

The metallicity of both stars in the binary system is thought to be around Z = 0.004, roughly a fifth as metal-rich as the Sun.

The two stars are both considerably larger than their Roche lobes, so the pair likely appear as a peanut shape, which is a common way of describing contact binaries like Holmberg IX V1. The binary system is similar to other supergiant contact binary systems such as SMC R47 and BM Cassiopeiae.

The primary star has a temperature of 4,800 K.

The secondary star has the same, or a slightly higher, temperature as the primary, roughly 5,040 K.

=== Orbit ===
The two stars orbit each other every 270.7 days, on an orbit with zero eccentricity. The binary stars also eclipse each other, typical for contact binaries, and classifying it as a W Ursae Majoris variable.

=== Cepheid variable hypothesis ===
The data from the Large Binocular Telescope for Holmberg IX V1 could also fit a massive long-period Cepheid variable with a variable period of 135 days with an absolute magnitude of −7.0. However, the contact binary theory is more likely.

== See also ==
- GCIRS 16SW, another contact binary composed of two supergiants
