= V Cygni =

Variable star in the constellation Cygnus

Observation data Epoch J2000 Equinox ICRS
- Constellation: Cygnus
- Right ascension: 20^{h} 41^{m} 18.27^{s}
- Declination: +48° 08′ 28.8″
- Apparent magnitude (V): 7.70 to 13.9

Characteristics
- Evolutionary stage: Asymptotic giant branch
- Spectral type: C7,4eJ
- Variable type: Mira

Astrometry
Radial velocity (R_{v})	3 km/s
Proper motion (μ)	RA: −7.239 mas/yr Dec.: −13.582 mas/yr
Parallax (π)	1.8331±0.1454 mas
Distance	420 pc

Details
Radius	770 R_{☉}
Luminosity	8,300 to 21,000 L_{☉}
Temperature	2,600 K

Other designations
- V Cygni, Nova Cygni 1974, 2MASS J20411826+4808288, ASASSN-V J204118.25+480829.2, TIC 286094845, HIP 102082, IRAS 20396+4757, IRC +50338, Gaia DR3 2167591280437990656

Database references
SIMBAD	data

V Cygni (also known as Nova Cygni 1974) is a carbon star in the constellation Cygnus. It is a Mira variable with an apparent magnitude that varies between 7.7 and 13.9.
