= NGC 5806 =

Spiral galaxy in the constellation Virgo

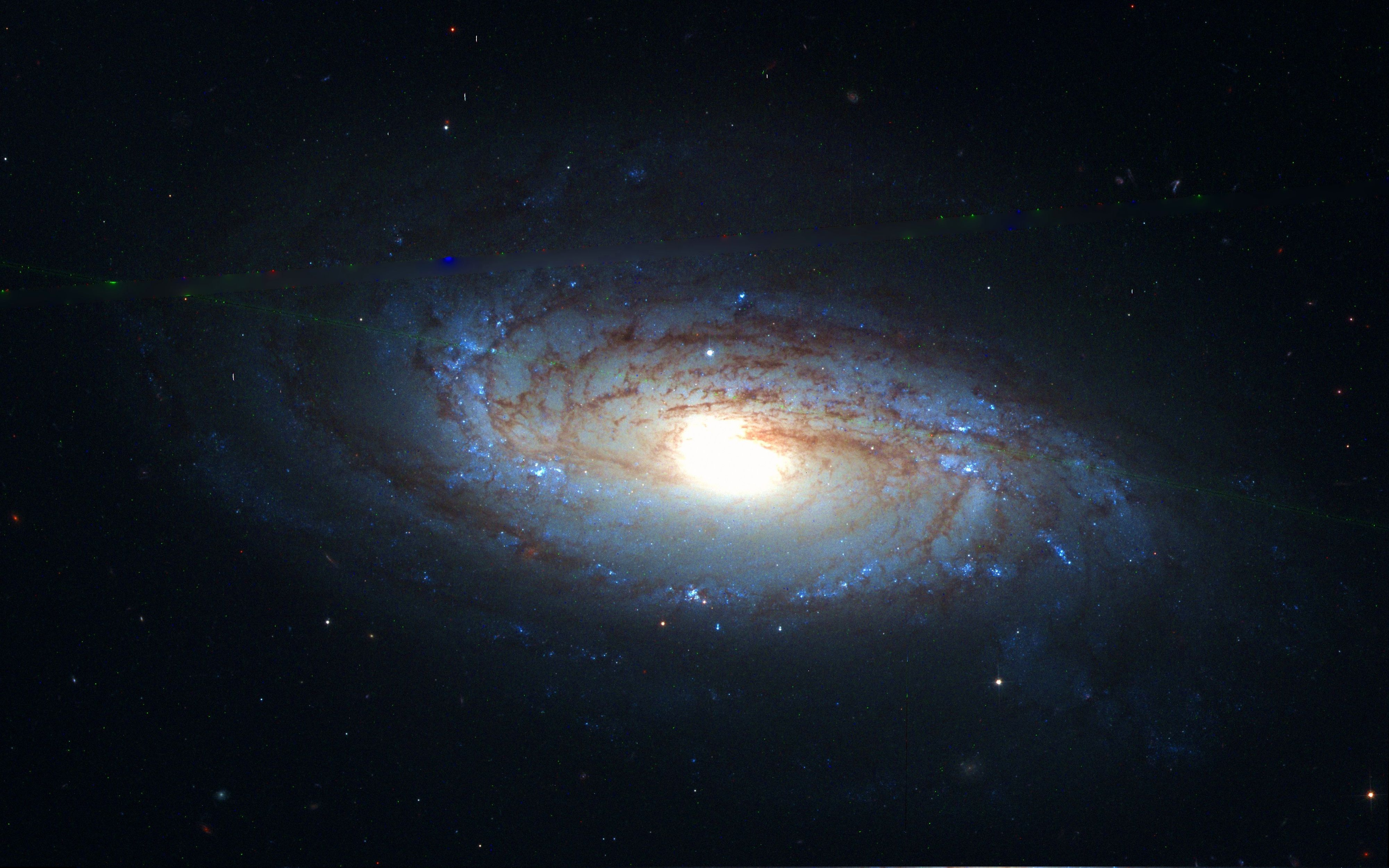
- NGC 5806 imaged by the Hubble Space Telescope

Observation data (J2000 epoch)
- Constellation: Virgo
- Right ascension: 15^{h} 00^{m} 00.4123^{s}
- Declination: +01° 53′ 28.756″
- Redshift: 0.004493
- Heliocentric radial velocity: 1346 ± 21 km/s
- Distance: 68 Mly (21 Mpc)
- Group or cluster: NGC 5806 Group (LGG 392)
- Apparent magnitude (V): 11.70
- Apparent magnitude (B): 12.40

Characteristics
- Type: SAB(s)b
- Size: ~73,900 ly (22.65 kpc) (estimated)
- Apparent size (V): 3.1′ × 1.6′

Other designations
- IRAS 14574+0205, UGC 9645, MCG +00-38-014, PGC 53578, CGCG 020-041

NGC 5806 is an intermediate spiral galaxy in the constellation Virgo. It was discovered by German-British astronomer William Herschel on 24 February 1786. It is located about 70 million light-years (21 Megaparsecs) away from the Milky Way. It is a member of the NGC 5846 Group.

== Supernovae and Imposter ==
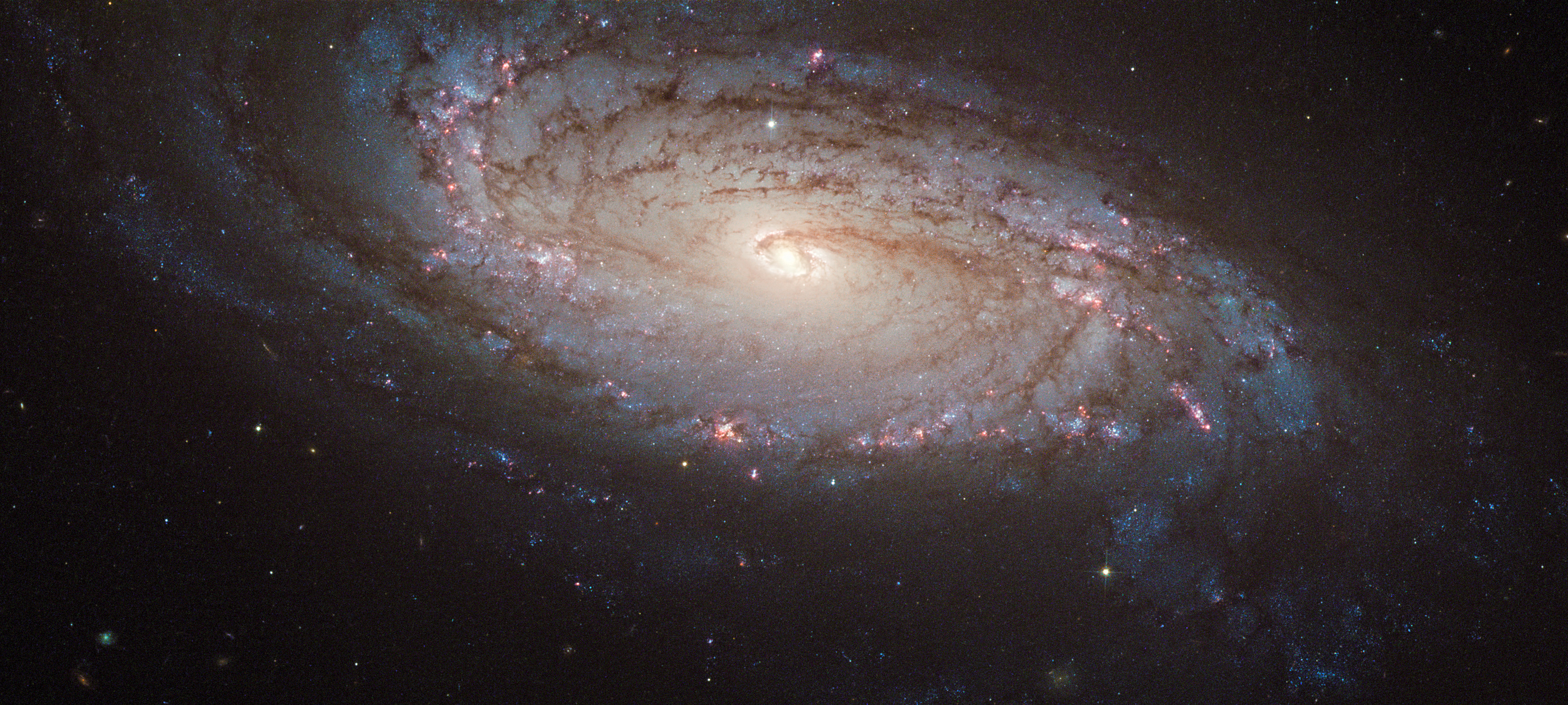
Supernova SN 2004dg in NGC 5806

Three supernovae and one supernova imposter have been observed in NGC 5806:

- SN 2004dg (Type II, mag. 17.1) was discovered by Associazione Ternana Astrofili on 19 July 2004. The progenitor of SN 2004dg has not been detected and is expected to have been a relatively low mass, low luminosity, red supergiant.
- SN 2012P (Type IIb, mag. 15.0) was discovered by Fabio Briganti on 22 January 2012. Originally classified as a Type Ib/c, it was later determined to be Type IIb. Later analysis concluded that the progenitor had an initial mass of 15.2 M_{☉}.
- iPTF13bvn (Type Ib, mag. 17.2) was discovered by the Palomar Transient Factory on 16 June 2013.
- SN Hunt 248 (also known as AT 2014ib) was discovered by the Catalina Real-time Transient Survey and Stan Howerton on 21 May 2014. It was initially catalogued as a supernova, but was later classified as a supernova imposter. The progenitor was detected as a cool hypergiant with an absolute visual magnitude of −9 and 400,000 times more luminous than the sun. The eruption saw it increase in luminosity to around 80,000,000 L_{☉}. Later analysis concluded that this object is a luminous red nova.
