= Jose Diego =

Spanish astrophysicist (born 1973)

José María Diego
- José María Diego Rodríguez
- Born: 1973 (age 52–53); Spain
- Education: University of Cantabria
- Known for: Free-form gravitational lens modelling (WSLAP+); Studies of highly magnified individual stars at cosmological distances
- Awards: Gruber Prize in Cosmology (2018, shared with the Planck team)
- Scientific career
- Fields: Astrophysics, cosmology
- Workplaces: Instituto de Física de Cantabria (CSIC)
- Thesis: Data analysis techniques for CMB data and the Sunyaev–Zel'dovich effect (2000)

José María Diego Rodríguez, who publishes as J. M. Diego, is a Spanish astrophysicist and cosmologist. He is a permanent staff researcher of the Spanish National Research Council (CSIC) at the Instituto de Física de Cantabria (IFCA) in Santander.

Diego's research is focused on dark matter, gravitational lensing by galaxy clusters, the Sunyaev–Zeldovich effect, and the use of extreme magnification events near cluster caustics to study the nature of dark matter. He is a member of the Planck collaboration and of the Euclid and J-PAS collaborations, and a member of the recently approved European Space Agency mission ARRAKIHS. He was a co-author of the studies reporting the individually magnified distant stars known as Icarus and Earendel. He led the discovery of the lensed star Quyllur, the first red supergiant detected star with JWST at redshift z=2.8178, and the three known kaiju stars so far Godzilla, Mothra and Hedorah.

== Early life and education ==
Diego studied physics at the University of Cantabria in Santander, receiving a Bachelor of Science degree in 1996. For his doctoral studies he remained at University of Cantabria, and was awarded a PhD in physics and astronomy in 2000 for a thesis titled Data analysis techniques for CMB data and the Sunyaev-Zel'dovich effect

== Career ==
=== Postdoctoral positions ===
From 2001 to 2003 Diego held a Marie Curie European Fellowship at the University of Oxford, working in the group of Joseph Silk. He then joined the group of Max Tegmark, first at the University of Pennsylvania (2003–2004) and then at the Massachusetts Institute of Technology (2004–2005).

=== Instituto de Física de Cantabria ===
In 2005 Diego returned to Spain as a researcher at IFCA under a Ramón y Cajal tenure-track contract with CSIC, and in 2009 he became a permanent CSIC staff researcher at the institute. Between 2010 and 2013 he also acted as director of the Observatorio Astronómico de Cantabria, an outreach and research facility of the Regional Government of Cantabria.

== Research ==
=== Cosmic microwave background and the Sunyaev–Zeldovich effect ===
Diego's early work focused on the analysis of cosmic microwave background data and on the Sunyaev–Zeldovich effect produced by hot gas in galaxy clusters, including methods for detecting clusters in Planck data and a cross-correlation of WMAP and ROSAT observations. He is a Planck scientist and a member of the Low Frequency Instrument (LFI) core team. Within the Planck collaboration he led the intermediate-results paper on the Sunyaev-Zeldoch effect signal from the Virgo Cluster (2016).

=== Free-form lens modelling ===
Diego developed non-parametric ("free-form") methods for reconstructing the mass distribution of galaxy clusters from strong and weak lensing data, first presented as the Strong Lensing Analysis Package (SLAP) and later extended as WSLAP and WSLAP+. He applied these methods to the clusters of the Hubble Frontier Fields programme, and in 2016 published a free-form prediction for the reappearance of the multiply imaged supernova Refsdal behind MACS J1149.5+2223, one of several model predictions compared after the reappearance was observed. He was also part of the BUFFALO collaboration, a continuation of the Frontier Fields programme.

=== Extremely magnified stars, lensing of gravitational waves, and dark matter ===
Diego was part of the team that in 2018 reported the detection of Icarus, the first individual star detected at cosmological distances, at redshift 1.5 and magnified by the galaxy cluster MACS J1149 by a factor over one thousand. In the same period he published work arguing that microlensing of such stars near cluster caustics can be used to constrain the abundance of compact dark matter. In 2022 he was a co-author of the study reporting Earendel, a lensed star at redshift 6.2, which at the time of its discovery was the most distant individual star detected. He was the lead author of studies of other extremely magnified stars, including one nicknamed "Godzilla" in the Sunburst Arc (2022) and one nicknamed "Mothra" behind the cluster MACS0416 (2023). He also contributed to a 2025 study reporting more than 40 magnified stars in a single galaxy at redshift 0.725. Diego has studied the gravitational lensing of gravitational waves detected by LIGO and Virgo, including its use to constrain the abundance of primordial black holes, which can produce an interference pattern in the gravitational waves.

== Awards and recognition ==
- 2001–2003: Marie Curie Fellowship, European Union
- 2018: Gruber Prize in Cosmology, awarded to the Planck team
- 2018: Group Achievement Award of the Royal Astronomical Society, awarded to the Planck team
- 2019: Giuseppe and Vanna Cocconi Prize of the European Physical Society, awarded to the WMAP and Planck collaborations

== Science communication ==
Diego has written for popular-science magazines, including an article on the first stars in the February 2026 issue of Scientific American, also published in the French edition Pour la Science, and an article on lensed ancient light, co-written with S. Willner, in Sky & Telescope (2024).

== Selected publications ==
- Diego, J. M.; et al. (2005). "Non-parametric inversion of strong lensing systems". Monthly Notices of the Royal Astronomical Society. 360: 477.
- Diego, J. M.; et al. (2016). "A free-form prediction for the reappearance of supernova Refsdal in the Hubble Frontier Fields cluster MACSJ1149.5+2223". Monthly Notices of the Royal Astronomical Society. 456: 356.
- Planck Collaboration (2016). "Planck intermediate results. XL. The Sunyaev-Zeldovich signal from the Virgo cluster". Astronomy and Astrophysics. 596: A101.
- Kelly, P. L.; Diego, J. M.; et al. (2018). "Extreme magnification of an individual star at redshift 1.5 by a galaxy-cluster lens". Nature Astronomy. 2: 334.
- Diego, J. M.; et al. (2018). "Dark matter under the microscope: constraining compact dark matter with caustic crossing events". The Astrophysical Journal. 857: 25.
- Diego, J. M. (2019). "The Universe at extreme magnification". Astronomy and Astrophysics. 625: A84.
- Diego, J. M.; Broadhurst, T.; Smoot, G. F. (2021). "Evidence for lensing of gravitational waves from LIGO-Virgo data". Physical Review D. 104: 103529.
- Welch, B.; Coe, D.; Diego, J. M.; et al. (2022). "A highly magnified star at redshift 6.2". Nature. 603: 815.
- Diego, J. M.; et al. (2023). "JWST's PEARLS: Mothra, a new kaiju star at z = 2.091 extremely magnified by MACS0416, and implications for dark matter models". Astronomy and Astrophysics. 679: A31.
- Diego, J. M.; et al. (2024). "Imaging dark matter at the smallest scales with z ≈ 1 lensed stars". Astronomy and Astrophysics. 689: A167.
