= Icarus (star) =

Blue supergiant star in the constellation Leo

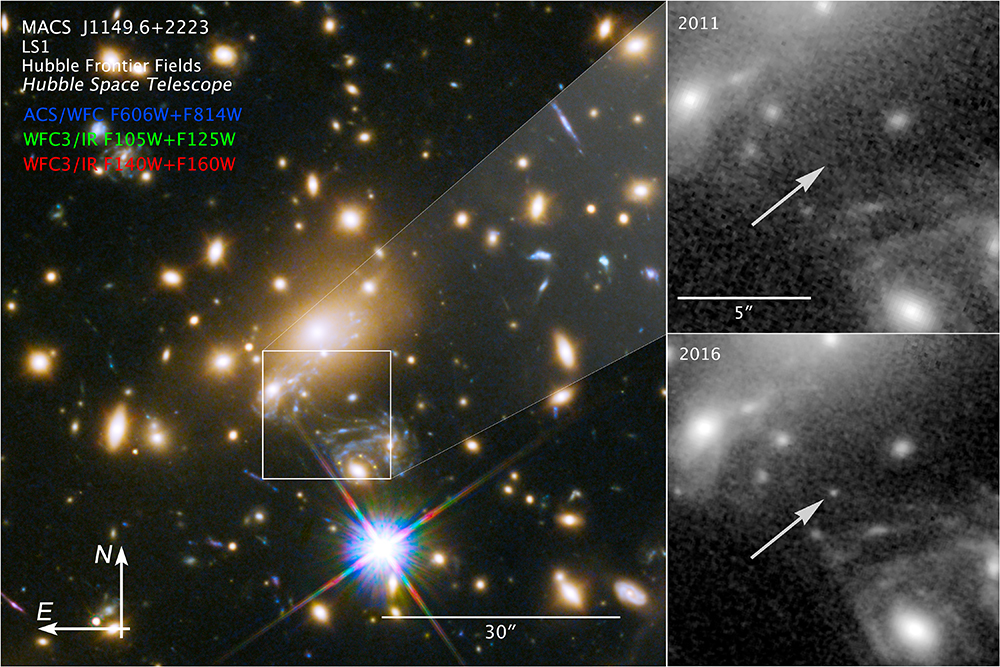
- Detection of MACS J1149 Lensed Star 1 A galactic cluster (left) magnified a distant star (now named Icarus) more than 2,000 times, making it visible in 2016 from Earth (lower right), 9.34 billion light-years away—although visible in 2016, the star was not visible in 2011 (upper right).

Observation data Epoch J2000 Equinox ICRS
- Constellation: Leo
- Right ascension: 11^{h} 49^{m} 35.59^{s}
- Declination: 22° 23′ 47.4″

Astrometry
| Distance | Redshift of 1.49 yields comoving distances of 14.4 billion ly |

Characteristics
- Spectral type: B
- Apparent magnitude (V): ≈28.4 (normally 29.9) (Note: The microlensing event brightened the star by a factor of 4, or about 1.5 magnitudes. With 600× magnification, it is brightened by 600^{2} (360,000), which would be an additional magnitude difference of 13.9 magnitudes. Therefore, the star would have Vmag of 43.8 without any lensing effects, thousands of times dimmer than any current or planned telescopes can see.)
- Apparent magnitude (R): ≈28.2 (normally 29.7)
- Apparent magnitude (Z): ≈27.9 (normally 29.4)
- Apparent magnitude (J): 27.3 (normally 28.8)
- Apparent magnitude (H): 27.4 (normally 28.9)

Details
| Surface gravity (log g) | 2 - 4 cgs |
| Temperature | 11,000 – 14,000 K |
| Metallicity | Z ≈ 0.006 |
| Metallicity [Fe/H] | -0.35 dex |
| Age | ~8 Myr |

Other designations
- Icarus, LS1, MACS J1149 LS1, MACS J1149 Lensed Star 1 (LS1), MACS J1149+2223 Lensed Star 1

Icarus (also known as MACS J1149 LS1 (Note: Other names include LS1, MACS J1149 LS1, MACS J1149 Lensed Star 1 (LS1), MACS J1149 Lensed Star 1 and MACS J1149+2223 Lensed Star 1)) is a blue supergiant star observed through a gravitational lens. It is the seventh most distant individual star to have been detected so far (after Earendel, Godzilla, Mothra, Quyllur, MACS J0647.7+7015 LS1 & 2), at approximately 14 billion light-years from Earth (redshift z=1.49; comoving distance of 14.4 billion light-years; lookback time of 9.34 billion years). Light from the star was emitted 4.4 billion years after the Big Bang. According to co-discoverer Patrick Kelly, the star is at least a hundred times more distant than the next-farthest non-supernova star observed, SDSS J1229+1122, and is the first magnified individual star seen.

== History ==
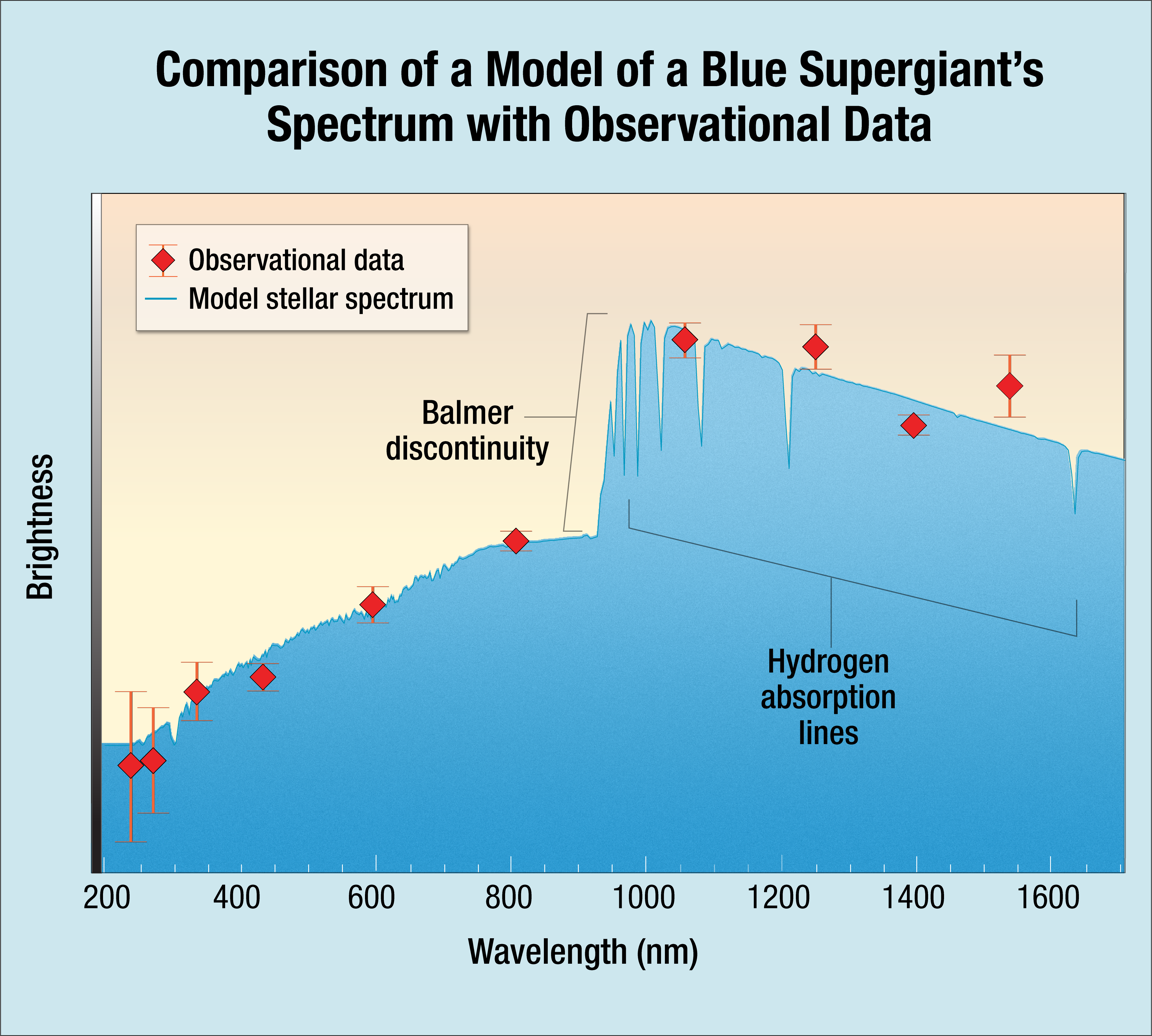
Comparison of observed data of the star Icarus with a model of a blue supergiant star spectrum. Ultraviolet light is redshifted into the visible range and the star appears reddish.

In April and May 2018, the star was found in the course of studying the supernova SN Refsdal with the Hubble Space Telescope. Astronomer Patrick Kelly of the University of Minnesota is the lead author of the finding, published in the journal Nature Astronomy.

While astronomers had been collecting images of this supernova from 2004 onward, they recently discovered a point source that had appeared in their 2013 images, and become much brighter by 2016. They determined that the point source was a solitary star being magnified more than 2,000 times by gravitational lensing. The light from LS1 was magnified not only by the huge total mass of the galaxy cluster MACS J1149.5+2223—located 5 billion light-years away—but also transiently by another compact object of about three solar masses within the galaxy cluster itself that passed through the line of sight, an effect known as gravitational microlensing. The galaxy cluster magnification is probably a factor of 600, while the microlensing event, which peaked in May 2016, brightened the image by an additional factor of ~4. There was a second peak near the brightness curve maximum, which may indicate the star was binary. The microlensing body may have been a star or a black hole in the cluster. Continuous monitoring of the star Icarus may one day rule out the possibility that primordial black holes constitute a sizable fraction of dark matter. Normally, the only astronomical objects that can be detected at this range would be either whole galaxies, quasars, or supernovas, but the light from the star was magnified by the lensing effect. They determined the light was from a stable star, not a supernova, as its temperature did not fluctuate; the temperature also allowed them to catalog the star as a blue supergiant. Because the visible light is the redshifted ultraviolet tail, the star does not appear blue to us but reddish or pink.

The light observed from the star was emitted when the universe was about 30% of its current age of 13.8 billion years. Kelly suggested that similar microlensing discoveries could help them identify the earliest stars in the universe.

== Name ==
The formal name MACS J1149 is a reference to MAssive Cluster Survey and the star's coordinates in the J2000 astronomical epoch.

While Kelly had wanted to name the star Warhol, alluding to Andy Warhol's notion of having 15 minutes of fame, the team ended up naming the star Icarus based on the Greek mythological figure.

== Astrophysical implications ==
The discovery shows that astronomers can study the oldest stars in background galaxies of the early universe by combining the strong gravitational lensing effect from galaxy clusters with gravitational microlensing events caused by compact objects in these galaxy clusters. By using these events, astronomers can study and test some models about dark matter in galaxy clusters and observe high energy events (supernovae, variable stars) in young galaxies.

== See also ==
- List of the most distant astronomical objects
- List of most distant stars
