= Nearest star =

The characteristic nearest star can refer to both stars:

- Proxima Centauri, in relation to the Solar System
- Sun, in relation to Earth and humanity

== See also ==
- List of nearest stars
- List of most distant stars
- Astronomy
