= 2024 K-World Dream Awards =

2024 edition of award ceremony

- Date: August 22, 2024
- Venue: Jamsil Indoor Stadium, Seoul
- Country: South Korea
- Presented by: TV Daily
- Hosted by: Jun Hyun-moo; Jang Do-yeon
- Preshow hosts: Kim Min-gi; Hwang In-hye
- Most awards: NCT 127; aespa; Zerobaseone (3)

Television/radio coverage
- Network: hellolive; UPick; Celuv Media

The 2024 K-World Dream Awards was an award ceremony held at Jamsil Indoor Stadium in Seoul on August 22, 2024. It is the 2024 edition of the annual award show K-World Dream Awards. The blue carpet ceremony was hosted by comedian Kim Min-ki and actress Hwang In-hye. Meanwhile, the award ceremony was hosted by Jun Hyun-moo and Jang Do-yeon.

It was broadcast live on Lemino in Japan and hellolive for worldwide.

== Criteria ==
Category	Criteria		Notes
Category	Online voting	Panelist	Notes
Popularity Awards	100%	—	Voting platform : UPick Application; Voting period : Group Popularity Awards : July 18 – August 8, 2024; Solo Popularity Awards : July 19 – August 9, 2024
Global UPICK Choice	100%	—	Voting platform : UPick Application; The voting period divided by 3 rounds : Pre-vote round : July 10–15, 2024; 1st round : July 16–25, 2024; 2nd round (Final) : July 25 – August 12, 2024

== Winner and nominees ==
The winner was listed in bold.

Best Artist
Group	Solo
**NCT 127**; **aespa**	**Bibi**
Bonsang
**Kiss of Life**; **Lee Mu-jin**; **Bibi**; **Tomorrow X Together**; **Plave**; **aespa**; **NCT 127**; **Itzy**; **Zerobaseone**; **QWER**
Best Song	Best Producer
**Zico**; **Le Sserafim**; **Ive**; **(G)I-dle**; **Seventeen**	**Shinsadong Tiger**
Best Band	Best Music Video
**QWER**	**aespa**; **Young Posse**
Best All-round Musician	Best Performance
**Chaeyeon**; **Baekho**	**NCT 127**; **Billlie**; **Ha Sung-woon**
Best OST	Music Icon
**Crush**	**Unis**; **Hi-Fi Un!corn**
Listeners Choice	Super Rookie
**JD1**; **Lee Mu-jin**	**TWS**; **NCT Wish**
Next Leader	New Trend
**Badvillain**	**Plave**; **TripleS**
Journalist Pick Artist	hellolive Global Star
**Zerobaseone**; **Tomorrow X Together**	**P1Harmony**
UPICK Popularity Award
Boy Group	Girl Group
**EXO**; Nominees: BTS; Enhypen; Seventeen; Plave; NCT Dream; Treasure; Stray Kids; Zerobaseone; NCT 127; WayV; Tomorrow X Together; Hori7on; Ateez; Evnne; NCT Wish; Xodiac; SF9; &Team; Boynextdoor	**Unis**; Nominees: QWER; Twice; Blackpink; Babymonster; Itzy; NewJeans; Secret Number; Red Velvet; Le Sserafim; (G)I-dle; NiziU; aespa; Illit; Badvillain; Dreamcatcher; woo!ah!; Young Posse; WJSN; Kep1er
Boy Solo	Girl Solo
**Kim Jae-joong**; Nominees: Lee Chan-won; Xia; Lee Seung-gi; Lee Seung-yoon; Ha Sung-woon; JD1; Lim Young-woong; B.I; Kim Hee-jae; Henry; Bang Ye-dam; Lee Mu-jin; Lee Jin-hyuk; Be'o; Baekho; Youngtak; Hwang yeong-woong; Kang Daniel; Woodz; Kim Woo-seok; Park Se-wook; Kim Jae-hwan; Wonho; Ren; Mooryong; 10CM; Loco; Wonstein; Kim Jong-hyun; Roy Kim; Zico; Ong Seong-woo; Jay Park; Park Ji-hoon; Gray; Jeong Se-woon; Hwang Min-hyun; Jang Min-ho; Paul Kim; BewhY; Simon Dominic; Kim Min-seok; Nucksal; Choi Soo-ho; Ash Island; Swings; Dean; An Seong-hoon; Crush; Kid Milli; Yoon Jun-hyeop; Leellamarz; Park Min-su; Park Seo-jin; Shin Seong; Son Tae-jin; Hwang Chi-yeul; Kim Jung-yeon; Park Seongon; Yang Hong-won	**Jeon Yu-jin**; Nominees: IU; Kim Se-jeong; Hynn; Bibi; Lee Chae-yeon; Kwon Eun-bi; Kim Eui-young; Yang Ji-eun; Byeol Sa-rang; Chuu; Yena; Yuju; Somi; Jo Yu-ri; Bin Ye-seo; Song Ga-in; Lee Young-ji; Heize; Yerin; Soyou; Jung Seo-joo; Hong Ji-yun; Chungha; CL; Oh Yu-jin; Kim So-you; Hyolyn; BoA; Bae A-hyun; Lee Hi; Jessi; Kim Da-hyun; Nayeong; Younha; Hyun-A; Kim So-yeon; Bok Ji-eun; Baek Ye-rin; Kang Hye-yeon; Maria; Kang Ye-seul; Ryu Won-jung; Maijin; Seol Ha-yoon; Yoon Mi-rae; Meenoi; Cheetah; Choi Hyang; Eun Ga-eun; Hongja; Hwang Woo-lim; Jang Yoon-jeong; Jung Da-kyung; Jung Miae; Jung Seul; Kim Na-hee; Kim Tae-yeon; Kisum; Kwon Jin-ah; Kyoungseo; LYn; Miss Kim; Park Hye-sin; Shin Mirae
Global UPICK Choice
**Zhang Hao (Zerobaseone)**; Nominees: Baekhyun (EXO); Jin (BTS); Jun (Seventeen); Ni-Ki (Enhypen); Kim Ji-woong (Zerobaseone); Jaehyun (Boynextdoor); Jimin (BTS); Ten (WayV); J-Hope (BTS); Choi Jung-eun (Izna); Shotaro (Riize); Joshua (Seventeen); RM (BTS); Zayyan (Xodiac); V (BTS); Bessie (Lapillus); Bambam (Got7); Yushi (NCT Wish); Ricky (Zerobaseone); Jeong Sae-bi (Izna); Wendy (Red Velvet); Irene (Red Velvet); Sung Han-bin (Zerobaseone); Jungkook (BTS); Yejun (Plave); Sunghoon (Enhypen); Lee Know (Stray Kids); Gehlee (Unis); Moonbyul (Mamamoo)

== Performers ==
The first performer lineup was announced on July 12, 2024. The second lineup was announced on July 19, 2024. The third lineup was announced on July 25, 2024. The fourth lineup was announced on July 30, 2024. Lee Chae-yeon was announced as the additional lineup along with the presenters lineup.

Order of the performance, showing name of the performers and the performed songs
Order	Artist(s)	Song performed
1	Badvillain	"Badvillain"
2	Unis	"Poppin'"
3	Hi-Fi Un!corn	"U&I"
4	P1Harmony	"Killin' It"
5	Kiss of Life	Intro + "Sticky"
6	TripleS	"Girls Never Die"
7	JD1	"Error 405"
8	Lee Mu-jin	"Propose"
9	Tomorrow X Together	"Deja Vu"
10	QWER	"T.B.H"
11	Ha Sung-woon and Chaeyeon	"말을 해줘" (Note: A new song written by Park Geun-tae.)
12	Illit	"Magnetic (Starlight remix)"
13	Itzy	Intro + "Untouchable"
14	NCT Wish	Intro + "Songbird"
15	Chaeyeon	Intro + "Don't"
16	Baekho	Intro + "Elevator"
17	Billlie	"Dang! Hocus Pocus"
18	Ha Sung-woon	"Blessed"
19	Young Posse	"Ate That"
20	Tomorrow X Together	"I'll See You There Tomorrow"
21	Aespa	"Supernova", "Armageddon"
22	NCT 127	"Fact Check", "Walk"

== Presenters ==
The presenter lineup was announced on August 14, 2024.

Order of the presentation, showing name of the presenters and the awards categories
Order	Artist(s)	Presented
1	Jun Hyun-moo and Jang Do-yeon	Next Leader Award
1	Jun Hyun-moo and Jang Do-yeon	Music Icon Award
2	Chang Ji-hye (hellolive CCO)	hellolive Global Star Award
3	Jun Hyun-moo and Jang Do-yeon	Bonsang Award
4	Seo Min-kyu (Studio Beyond Inc. CEO)	Best Artist (Solo)
5	Jeon Hyun-moo and Jang Do-yeon	New Trend Award
6	Kim Hye-jun	Listener Choice Award
7	Jun Hyun-moo and Jang Do-yeon	Bonsang Award
7	Jun Hyun-moo and Jang Do-yeon	UPICK Popularity Awards
8	Lim Chan (Ahead Korea UPICK CEO)	Global UPICK Choice Award
9	Jun Hyun-moo and Jang Do-yeon	Best Band Award
9	Jun Hyun-moo and Jang Do-yeon	Best Song Award
9	Jun Hyun-moo and Jang Do-yeon	Bonsang Award
9	Jun Hyun-moo and Jang Do-yeon	Best Producer Award
9	Jun Hyun-moo and Jang Do-yeon	Super Rookie Award
9	Jun Hyun-moo and Jang Do-yeon	Best All-round Musician Award
10	Park Se-wan and Arron Yang (ShinyBrands Group CEO)	Best Performance Award
11	Jin Se-yeon and	Best Music Video Award
12	Kwon Yul and Kim Ji-hyun (TVDaily Editor in Chief)	Journalist Pick Artist Award
13	Joo Jung-eun and Lee Kyu-seok	Best Artist Award
