= List of most distant stars =

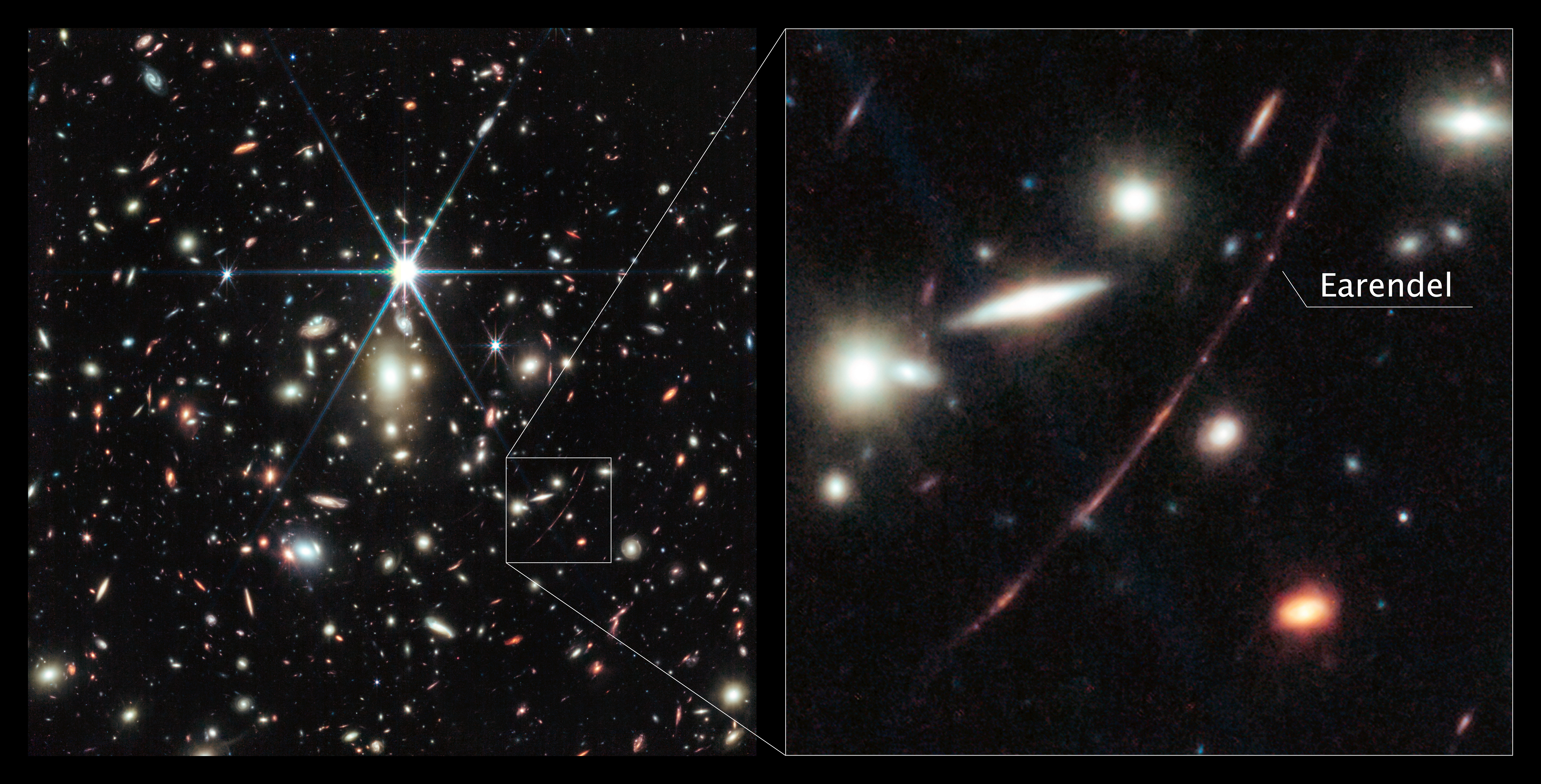
Image of Earendel, one of the most distant known stars

This is a list of the most distant individually seen stars discovered, a list of the most distant stars that are separately known, resolved as individual stars, or as multiple star systems. It is not a list of sources that should contain stars that are distant but no separate stars within that source are separately known, such as unresolved stars in star clusters, galaxies, galaxy clusters.

Distances to stars may be determined through parallax measurements, use of standard references such as cepheid variables or Type Ia supernovas to the object in which the star resides, or redshift measurement. Spectroscopic redshift measurement is preferred, while photometric redshift measurement is also used to identify candidate high redshift sources. The symbol z represents redshift.

== Most distant stars ==
List of most distant individually seen stars
Star	Redshift	Distance (Mpc)	Discovery	Notes
Earendel	6.2±0.1	8,600	2022	The most distant known star as of 2023. Most likely a star cluster.
MACS J0647.7+7015 LS1	4.8	7,830	2023	
MACS J0647.7+7015 LS2	4.8	7,830	2023	
Hedorah	3.72	6,480	2026	
Abell 2744 LS1	2.65	6,110	2022	
Godzilla	2.38	5,780	2022	The most luminous known star.
Quyllur	2.1878	5,540	2023	First red supergiant at cosmological distances.
Mothra	2.091	5,400	2023	A binary consisting of a yellow supergiant or yellow hypergiant and a Blue supergiant.
Icarus	1.49	4,410	2018	The most distant known star prior to the discovery of Earendel.
Warhol	0.94	3,000	2014	Transient, extremely luminous O-type star or a Large Wolf-Rayet star
SNHunt51	0.0399	164	2011	Likely a Luminous blue variable in PGC 159645.
SN 2025agby	0.036	154	2025	Possibly an erupting Luminous blue variable or a real supernova.
SN 2012as	0.0297	131	2012	Possibly an erupting Luminous blue variable or a real supernova.
OGLE-2014-SN-173	0.0296 – 0.079283	130 – 362	2014	Possibly an erupting Luminous blue variable or a real supernova.
CBET 2119	0.0268	117.8	2010	Luminous blue variable.
SNHunt45	0.027	112.6	2011	Likely a Luminous blue variable in NGC 3601.
AT2021qvw	0.025	109.8	2021	Luminous blue variable and Supernova impostor.
LSQ12hot	0.024	105.4	2012	Luminous blue variable.
SN 2020zmn	0.019	84	2020	Luminous blue variable.
AT 2022zmn	0.019	84	2022	Luminous blue variable.
AT 2022oku	0.018	79	2022	Luminous blue variable.
AT2024fff	0.016628	72.6	2024	Luminous blue variable and Supernova impostor.
AT2021kgj	0.014237	62	2021	Possibly an erupting Luminous blue variable or a real supernova in the galaxy NGC 4188.
AT 2018kle	0.012505	55	2018	Luminous blue variable.
PSN J07475117-1844586	0.011	47	2013	Luminous blue variable and Supernova impostor.
AT2019fxy	0.00946	41	2019	Luminous blue variable and Supernova impostor.
AT2022rmk	0.009	39	2022	Luminous blue variable and Supernova impostor.
2024qtn	0.007	30.3	2024	Luminous blue variable and Supernova impostor.
AT2022ryi	0.005017	21.7	2022	Luminous blue variable and Supernova impostor.
SN 2007sv	0.0037	20.6	2007	Luminous blue variable and Supernova impostor.
SDSS J1229+1122	0.000127	17	2013	Blue supergiant.

== List of most distant stars by type ==
List of most distant stars by type
Type	Star	Distance	Date	Notes	Ref.
Most distant, any type	Earendel (WHL0137-LS)	z=6.2 (Note: Measured by redshift (z)) 12.9 Gly (4.0 Gpc) (Note: Earendel: redshift z=6.2; light-travel distance 12.9 Gly (1.22×10^{23} km; 7.6×10^{22} mi); comoving distance 28 Gly (2.6×10^{23} km; 1.6×10^{23} mi);)	2022	This star is gravitationally lensed	
Most distant cepheid variable	P42	130 Mly (40 Mpc)	As of 2024	This cepheid is located in galaxy NGC 5468	
z represents redshift, a measure of recessional velocity and inferred distance due to cosmological expansion; mas represents parallax, a measure of angle and distance can be determined through trigonometry; pc represents parsec, a measure of distance, the distance that a parallax of an arcsecond corresponds with; ly represents lightyear, a measure of distance, the distance that light travels in a year

== List of most distant stars by event type ==
List of most distant stellar events
Type	Event	Distance	Date	Notes
Most distant gamma ray burst (GRB)	GRB 090423	z=8.2	2009	At the time of discovery, this was the most distant known object found so far.
z represents redshift, a measure of recessional velocity and inferred distance due to cosmological expansion; mas represents parallax, a measure of angle and distance can be determined through trigonometry; pc represents parsec, a measure of distance, the distance that a parallax of an arcsecond corresponds with; ly represents lightyear, a measure of distance, the distance that light travels in a year

== Timeline of most distant star recordholders ==
The succession of the most distant directly observed stars.

Stars in these lists were found to be the most distant star at the time of determination of their distance. This is frequently not the same as the date of their discovery.

Most distant star titleholders (Note: not including candidates based on photometric redshifts)
Star	Type	Date	Distance then estimated	Notes	Refs.
Earendel (WHL0137-LS)		2022–present	z=6.2	This star is gravitationally lensed	
Icarus (MACS J1149+2223 LS1)	B-I (blue supergiant)	2018−2022	z=1.49 (Note: Icarus: redshift z=1.5; light-travel distance 9.5 Gly (9.0×10^{22} km; 5.6×10^{22} mi);)	This star is gravitationally lensed	
SDSS J1229+1122	O	2013–2018	z=0.000127		
Arcturus (Alpha Bootis)	Solitary star	1891−1910	160 ly (18 mas) (this was very inaccurate, true=37 ly)	This number is wrong; originally announced in 1891, the figure was corrected in 1910 to 40 ly (60 mas). From 1891 to 1910, it had been thought this was the star with the smallest known parallax, hence the most distant star whose distance was known. Prior to 1891, Arcturus had previously been recorded of having a parallax of 127 mas.	
Capella (Alpha Aurigae)	Solitary star	1849−	72 ly (46 mas)		
Polaris (Alpha Ursae Minoris)	Variable star, solitary star	1847−1849	50 ly (80 mas) (this was very inaccurate, true=~375 ly)		
Vega (Alpha Lyrae)	Star (part of a double star pair)	1839−1847	7.77 pc (125 mas)		
61 Cygni	Binary star	1838−1839	3.48 pc (313.6 mas)	This was the first star other than the Sun to have its distance measured.	
Sun	Solitary star	3rd century BC – 1609	380 Earth radii (very inaccurate, true=16000 Earth radii)	Aristarchus of Samos made a measurement of the distance of the Sun from the Earth in relation to the distance of the Moon from the Earth. The distance to the Moon was described in Earth radii (20, also inaccurate). The diameter of the Earth had been calculated previously. At the time, it was assumed that some of the planets were further away, but their distances could not be measured. The order of the planets was conjecture until Kepler determined the distances from the Sun of the five known planets other than Earth. It had been conjectured that the fixed stars were much farther away than the planets.	
z represents redshift, a measure of recessional velocity and inferred distance due to cosmological expansion; mas represents milliarcseconds of parallax, a measure of angle and distance can be determined through trigonometry; pc represents parsec, a measure of distance, the distance that a parallax of an arcsecond corresponds with; ly represents lightyear, a measure of distance, the distance that light travels in a year

== Timeline of most distant star outburst recordholders ==
The succession of most distant separately known star explosion

Stars in these lists were found to be the most distant star at the time of determination of their distance. This is frequently not the same as the date of their discovery. These stars are known by having a singular event occur at the star, such as a supernova.

Most Distant Star Outburst Titleholders
Event	Type	Date	Distance	Notes
GRB 090423	Gamma-ray burst	2009–	z=8.2	At the time of discovery, this was the most distant known object found so far.
SN 1988U	Supernova	1988–	z=0.31	Located in the galaxy cluster AC118
z represents redshift, a measure of recessional velocity and inferred distance due to cosmological expansion; mas represents parallax, a measure of angle and distance can be determined through trigonometry; pc represents parsec, a measure of distance, the distance that a parallax of an arcsecond corresponds with; ly represents lightyear, a measure of distance, the distance that light travels in a year

== See also ==
- List of stars
- List of star extremes
- List of most distant supernovae
- List of the most distant astronomical objects
