= SDSS J1229+1122 =

Star in the constellation of Virgo

Observation data Epoch J2000.0 Equinox ICRS
- Constellation: Virgo
- Right ascension: 12^{h} 29^{m} 52.66^{s}
- Declination: +11° 22′ 27.8″
- Apparent magnitude (V): 22.85

Characteristics
- Spectral type: O

Astrometry
| Distance | 55 million ly |

Other designations
- SDSS J122952.66+112227.8

Database references
| SIMBAD | data |

SDSS J1229+1122 (SDSS J122952.66+112227.8) is a blue supergiant O-type star in the tail of dwarf irregular galaxy IC 3418. It illuminates a nebula clump of gas, and was discovered from the spectrum of the illumination source. The clump of gas resides in a tail caused by ram pressure stripping of gas from the galaxy by the galaxy cluster. It was determined to be a blue supergiant through analysis of its spectrum taken with the 8m Subaru telescope. The discovery was made by Youichi Ohyama and Ananda Hota, using the Subaru Telescope. This discovery was then followed up with the AstroSat to image it with finer angular resolution in the ultraviolet than that of GALEX. With addition of HST optical data the astronomers believe that the ram pressure stripped tail of IC3418 many have many such young star forming clumps and potentially single O-type stars.

Until the discovery of the doubly gravitationally lensed MACS J1149 Lensed Star 1 (also known as Icarus) in 2018, SDSS J1229+1122 was the most distant-known star, at 55 million light-years (17 Mpc) (stars more distant than this are only known through events that they cause, such as stellar explosions of supernovae and gamma ray bursts). (The record for the most distant star is Earendel, as of October 2023.)

The star (SDSS J1229+1122) and its galaxy are in the Virgo Cluster of galaxies. The clump of gas that the star illuminates is referred to as D3 or IC3418 D3, and lies within a filamentary structure referred to as F1 or IC3418 F1. The galactic tail and all within it are escaping the galaxy to become intracluster flotsam, unattached to any galaxy, just the cluster.
