= IC 3418 =

Galaxy in the constellation of Virgo

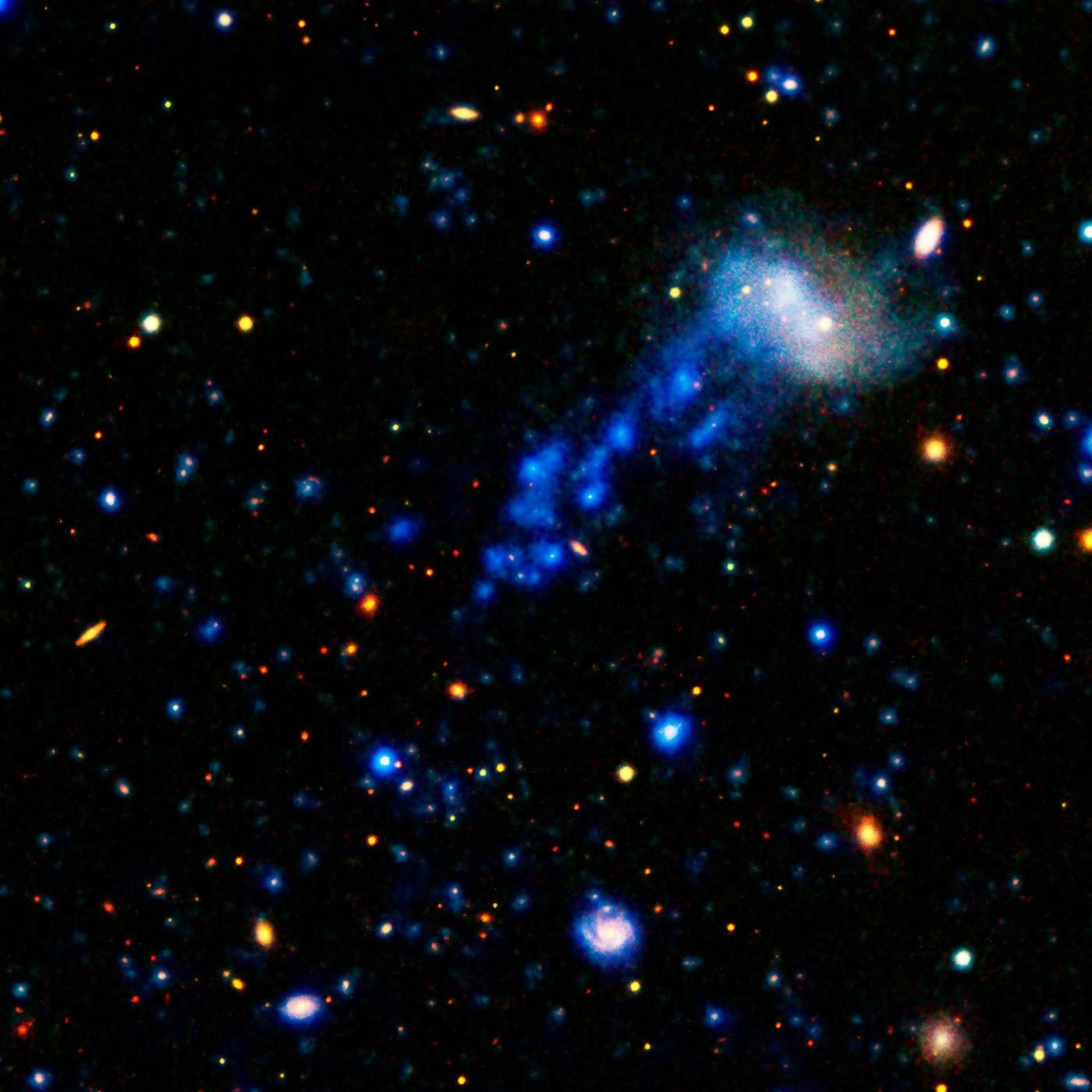
- Composite image of visible and near-ultraviolet

Observation data (J2000 epoch)
- Constellation: Virgo
- Right ascension: 12^{h} 29^{m} 43.919^{s}
- Declination: +11° 24′ 16.87″
- Redshift: 0.000127
- Heliocentric radial velocity: 38 km/s
- Distance: 55 Mly (17 mpc)
- Group or cluster: Virgo Cluster
- Apparent magnitude (V): 14.0

Characteristics
- Type: Sm
- Apparent size (V): 1.5 × 1.0′

Other designations
- UGC 07630, PGC 041207, DDO 130, VCC 1217.

IC 3418 is a galaxy in the constellation Virgo. It is most well noted for its tidal tail, which formed after the galaxy collided with the Virgo Cluster some 54 million light years from Earth. The galaxy is home to many starburst regions.

The galaxy is thought to be evolving from a dwarf irregular galaxy into a dwarf elliptical galaxy, as the ram pressure of the intracluster medium of the Virgo Cluster through which it is plowing through strips gas from the galaxy, leaving it gas poor, while concentrating the gas in the tidal tail, forming "fireballs" of star formation in its wake. Although the more distant "fireballs" are older than the proximal ones, their star formation rates actually appear to be higher. This can be explained by the "fireballs" overcoming turbulent forces and collapsing from their own gravity, leading to higher star formation.

Within the tail is the second most distant star ever detected, as of 2013, a blue supergiant, SDSS J122952.66+112227.8, illuminating a clump of gas.
