= Sunburst Galaxy =

Galaxy

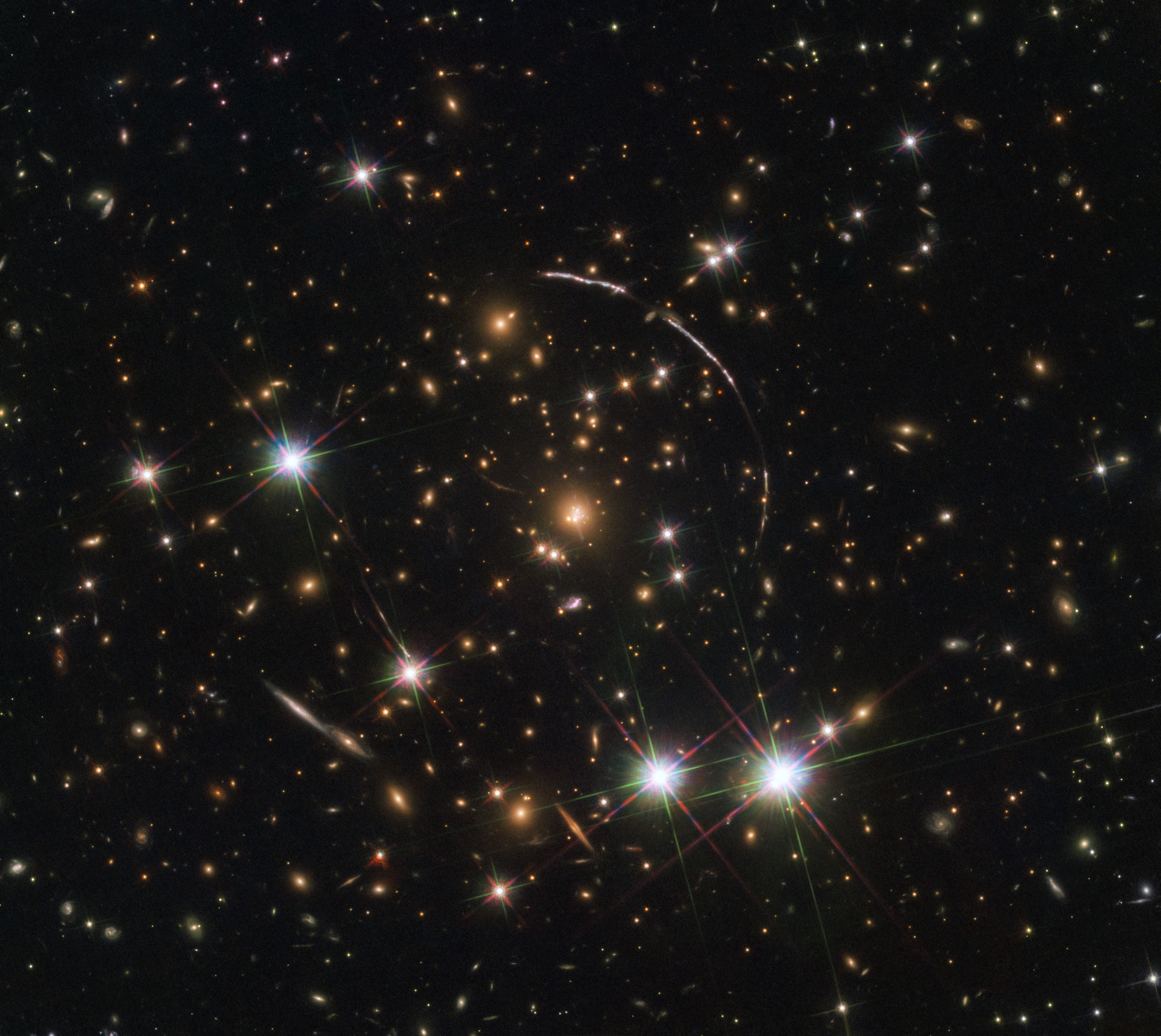
- The bright arcs between 12 and 3 o'clock are the Sunburst Galaxy. A fainter counter-image is seen between 7 o'clock and 9 o'clock.

Observation data (J2000 epoch)
- Constellation: Apus
- Right ascension: 15^{h} 50^{m} 04.4^{s}
- Declination: −78° 11′ 00″
- Distance: 10.9 billion ly

The Sunburst Galaxy is a strongly magnified galaxy at redshift z=2.38 (10.9 billion light years) behind the galaxy cluster PSZ1 G311.65-18.48.

The cluster acts as a powerful magnifier thanks to the gravitational lensing effect. The galaxy cluster distorts the space around it creating different paths for the photons coming from the Sunburst Galaxy. This lensing creates four arc segments roughly following a circle around the foreground lensing cluster. Chance alignments of the Sunburst Galaxy and galaxies in the lensing cluster break up some of the arc segments into multiple smaller images, creating a total of 12 full or partial images of the galaxy along the arc; some of these images are magnified by very large factors. In one of these strongly magnified images of the Sunburst Galaxy, astronomers have identified the most luminous star known to date, Godzilla. Another study suggests that Godzilla is a compact young massive star cluster that consists of thousands of bright stars and is magnified by a factor between about 500 and 2000. Emission from Godzilla's nebula indicates unusually pressurized ionized gas highly enriched with nitrogen.

The Sunburst Galaxy hosts a massive star cluster that is only 2-4 Myr after formation. The star cluster is very compact, weighing tens of millions of solar masses while having a radius no larger than 10 parsecs. The star cluster is seen to be leaking ionizing radiation into the intergalactic space. In its vicinity, the star cluster excites a dense nebula that is enriched with nitrogen and is likely to have condensed from massive star wind material.
