= Godzilla (star) =

Star in the Sunburst galaxy

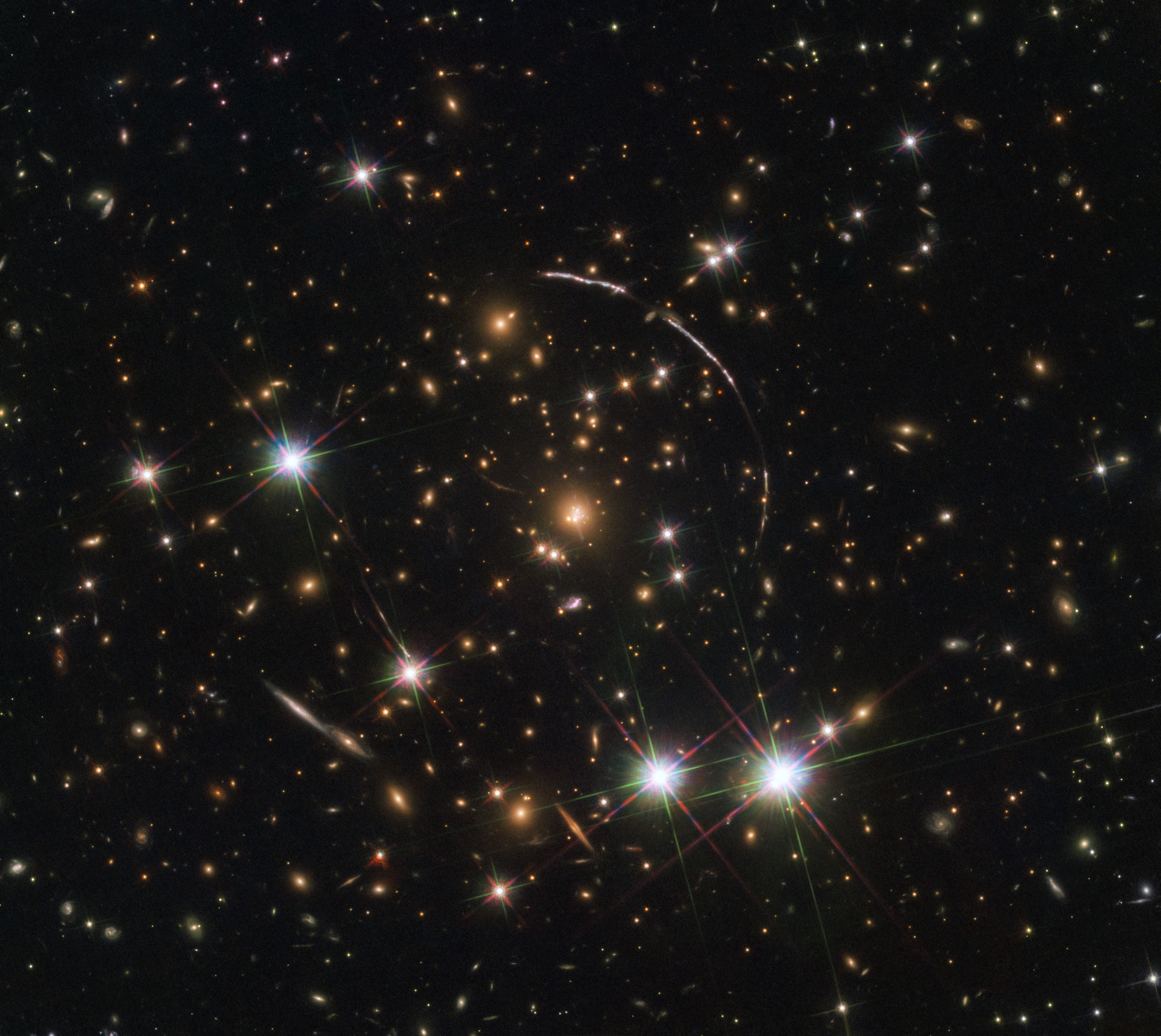
- [[File: |3000px]] The transient candidate dubbed Godzilla is the bright spot at the very center, at the left edge of the arc and immediately above the orange, foreground star. Cropped from original image. Credit: ESA/Hubble, NASA, Rivera-Thorsen et al.

Observation data Epoch J2000.0 Equinox ICRS
- Constellation: Apus
- Right ascension: 15^{h} 50^{m} 00.66^{s}
- Declination: −78° 11′ 10.0″

Characteristics
- Evolutionary stage: LBV?

Astrometry
Absolute magnitude (M_{V})	−17.3 – −14.8, (Note: Assuming t1-t5 are counterimages.) <−14.7 (Note: Assuming t1-t5 are not counterimages.)

Details
Radius	430 – 2,365 R_{☉}
Luminosity	134,000,000 – 255,000,000 (Note: Derived from model temperatures and radii (30,000 K, 2 AU, 15,000 K, 11 AU)) L_{☉}
Temperature	15,000 – 30,000 K

Other designations
- Godzilla star

Godzilla is a variable star candidate in the Sunburst galaxy at redshift z = 2.37 (or 10.9 billion light years from Earth), observed through the gravitational lens PSZ1 G311.65-18.48. It was originally identified in the NW arc as a possible transient event in images taken with the Hubble Space Telescope (HST).

Godzilla was named by Spanish astrophysicist Jose Diego after the kaiju and makes reference to its monstrous nature. Other stars named after kaiju include Mothra and Hedorah, which shares many of the characteristics of Godzilla.

As of October 2022, Godzilla was considered the most luminous star observable. This interpretation was supported by the hypothesis that the star was undergoing an episode of temporary increased luminosity lasting at least seven years, combined with an estimated magnification of at least a factor of 2000.

Some spectral features in Godzilla resemble those of other variable stars in the Milky Way Galaxy, such as Eta Carinae, suggesting that Godzilla could be close to the end of its life. It had been suggested that Godzilla was going through an episode similar to the Great Eruption of Eta Carinae in the 19th century, during which the star was likely among the brightest in the universe at about 50 million L_{☉}. However, 2023 JWST/NIRSpec observations revealed that the Hα emission line is not as broad as would be expected from a Great Eruption-like event, casting doubt on this interpretation.

The extreme magnification of Godzilla is partially due to a nearby substructure, probably a dwarf galaxy, not seen in the HST images (but recently detected in new JWST images), that is also close to the critical curve of the cluster. This unobserved substructure is believed to be dominated by dark matter.

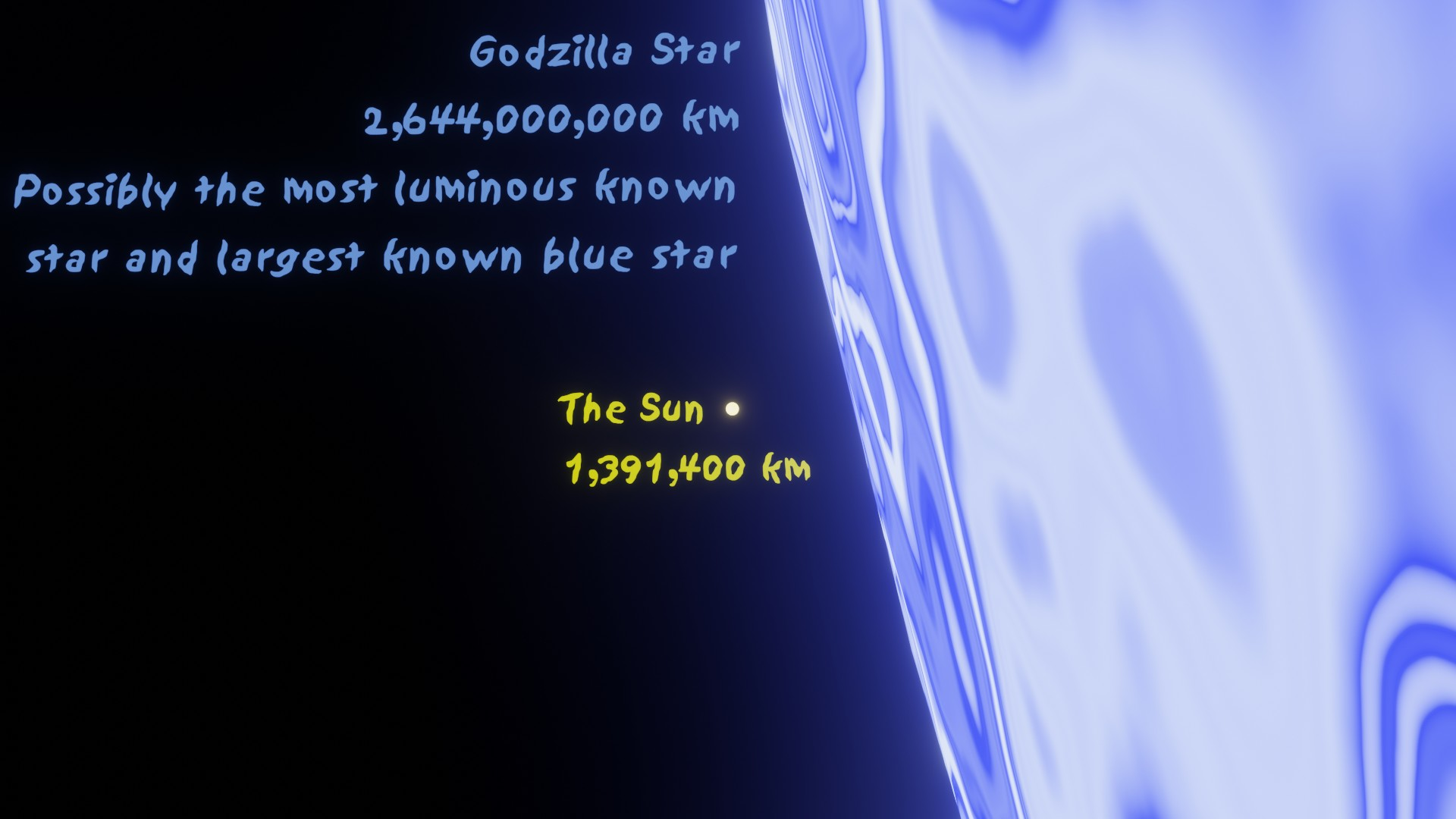
Size comparison between the Sun and Godzilla, assuming it is a single star.

A 2024 paper showed that Godzilla's source-frame ultraviolet light and nebular emission lines as measured by MUSE and X-shooter at the Very Large Telescope (VLT) can be quantitatively explained as that of a star cluster 4-6 Myr after formation and weighing millions of solar masses, magnified by a factor between about 500 and 2000. The authors show that the ionized gas as the source of Godzilla's nebular emission is enriched with nitrogen and possibly oxygen and helium too, and suggest that the gas is stellar wind and supernova ejecta condensed in the gravitational potential of the star cluster and is excited by ionizing stellar radiation. Based on the non-detection of flux time variability, which should be induced by intracluster microlensing effects but would be diluted if the source consists of many stars, the study suggests that Godzilla's magnification factor is lower than previously thought, in the range of hundreds. This casts doubt on the hypothesis that Godzilla's light is dominated by one or a few highly magnified stars.

A 2025 study using JWST/NIRCam and NIRSpec IFU observations proposed a hybrid scenario, in which Godzilla is neither a single highly magnified star nor an entire star cluster, but rather a partial star cluster containing a unique emission-line source. The study identified clump 4 as the less-magnified counterpart of Godzilla and the adjacent P knots, based on their similar positions in a color-color diagram and shared strong O I λ8449 emission. Since this Lyβ-pumped O I emission originates from a compact source, comparing its flux between Godzilla and clump 4 provides a more reliable measure of the magnification ratio. The study found that while Godzilla's O I λ8449 flux is 30–100 times brighter than that of clump 4 images, its stellar continuum is only 8–10 times brighter, indicating that Godzilla contains only 10–25% of the total stellar light of clump 4. Based on this, the authors concluded that the stellar continuum originates from multiple stars, while the emission lines arise from dense gas condensations analogous to the Weigelt blobs in Eta Carinae system. The study estimated magnification factors ranging from ≈600 to ≈25,000 depending on the lens model used. Although the evidence increasingly supports that Godzilla is not a single star, the exact scale of magnification and the approximate number or total mass of stars it contains remain subjects of future investigation.

== See also ==
- List of the most distant astronomical objects
- List of most distant stars
- R136a1
