= MACS1149-JD1 =

High-redshift galaxy in the constellation Leo

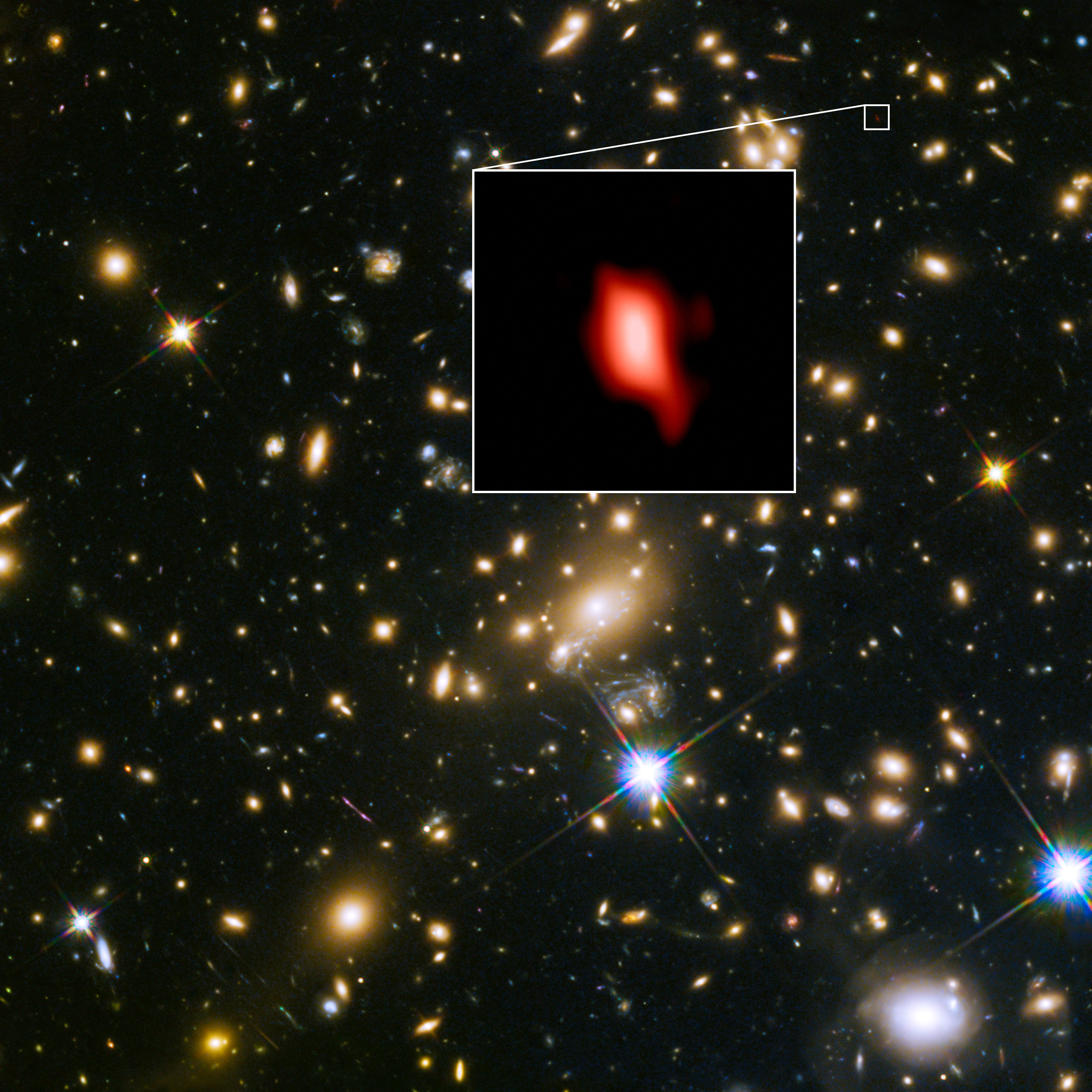
- Hubble and ALMA image of galaxy cluster MACS J1149.5+2223 with an inset of MACS1149-JD1

Observation data (J2000 epoch)
- Constellation: Leo
- Right ascension: 11^{h} 49^{m} 33.584^{s}
- Declination: +22° 24′ 45.78″
- Redshift: 9.1096±0.0006
- Heliocentric radial velocity: 2878008±59958 km/s
- Distance: 29.99 Gly (9.195 Gpc) (co-moving); 13.28 Gly (4.07 Gpc) (light travel)
- Group or cluster: MACS J1149.5+2223
- Apparent magnitude (V): 26.8

Characteristics
- Type: Dwarf
- Mass: 1.1+0.5 −0.2×10^{9} M_{☉}
- Size: 3,000 ly (diameter)
- Apparent size (V): 0.00075 x 0.00035

Other designations
- [PCB2012] 3020, [KOI2016] HFF4C-YJ1, [ZZI2017] 663

MACS1149-JD1 (also known as JD1 and PCB2012 3020) is a young galaxy that is known for being one of the farthest known galaxies from Earth. It was discovered in 2014 and confirmed in 2018. The JD1 galaxy is at a redshift of about z=9.11, or about 13.28 billion ly (4.07 billion pc) away from Earth meaning that it formed when the universe was around 500 million years old.

The carbon and neon abundances of JD1 are below the solar abundance ratio. The under-abundance of carbon suggests recent star formation where a Type II supernova enriched the interstellar medium (ISM) with oxygen, but intermediate mass stars have not yet enriched the ISM with carbon.

Due to a lack of old population stars detected, JD1 is probably a young galaxy.

We are able to see this galaxy because of the gravitational lensing caused by the MACS J1149.5+2223 Galaxy Cluster.

== See also ==
- CEERS-93316
- GLASS-z12
- HD1 galaxy
- List of the most distant astronomical objects
