= MACS J0416.1−2403 =

Galaxy cluster in the constellation Eridanus

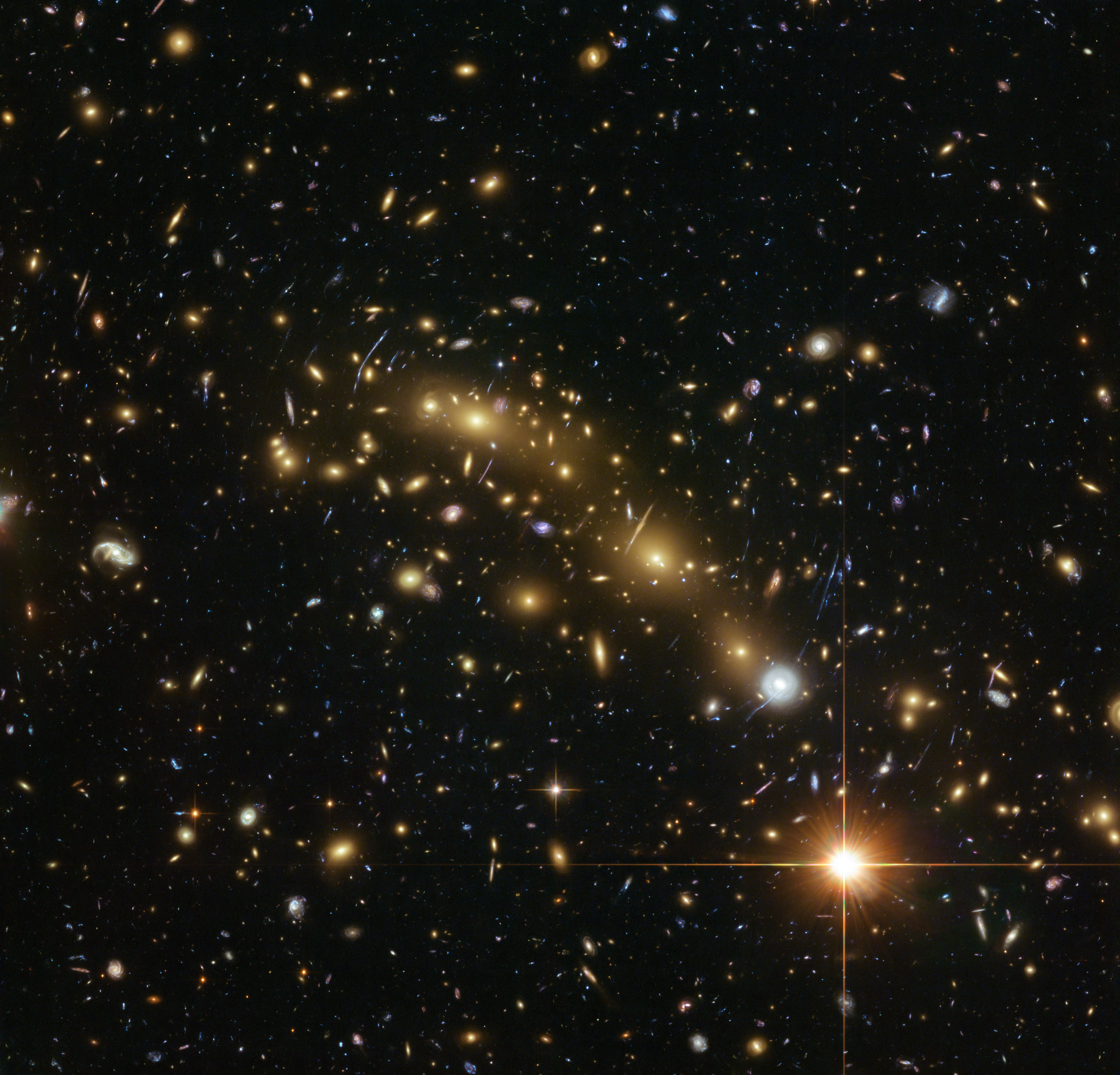
- Galaxy cluster MCS J0416.1−2403 imaged by the Hubble Space Telescope

Observation data (Epoch J2000.0)
- Constellation: Eridanus
- Right ascension: 04^{h} 16^{m} 09.9^{s}
- Declination: −24° 03′ 58″
- Redshift: 0.420000

Other designations
- MACS J0416.1−2403, MACS J0416−2403, MACS 0416.1−2403, MACS 0416−2403, 1RXS J041609.9−240358

MACS J0416.1−2403 or MACS0416 abbreviated, is a cluster of galaxies at a redshift of z=0.397 with a mass 160 trillion times the mass of the Sun inside 200 kpc (650 kly). Its mass extends out to a radius of 950 kpc (3,100 kly) and was measured as 1.15 × 10^{15} solar masses. The system was discovered in images taken by the Hubble Space Telescope during the Massive Cluster Survey, MACS. This cluster causes gravitational lensing of distant galaxies producing multiple images. Based on the distribution of the multiple image copies, scientists have been able to deduce and map the distribution of dark matter. The images, released in 2014, were used in the Cluster Lensing And Supernova survey with Hubble (CLASH) to help scientists peer back in time at the early Universe and to discover the distribution of dark matter.

== Gallery ==
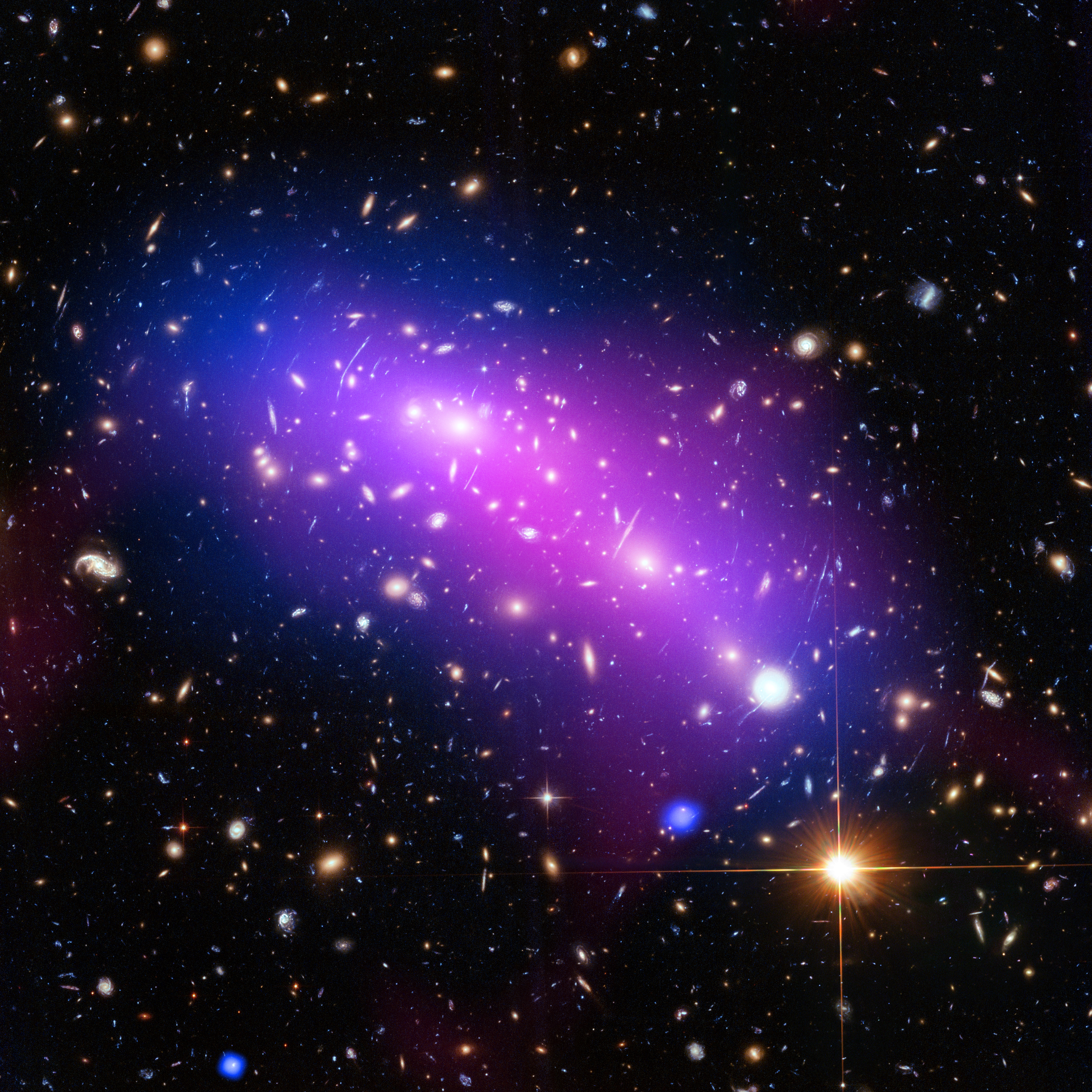
MACS J0416.1−2403 contains a significant amount of dark matter, which leaves a detectable imprint in visible light by distorting the images of background galaxies.

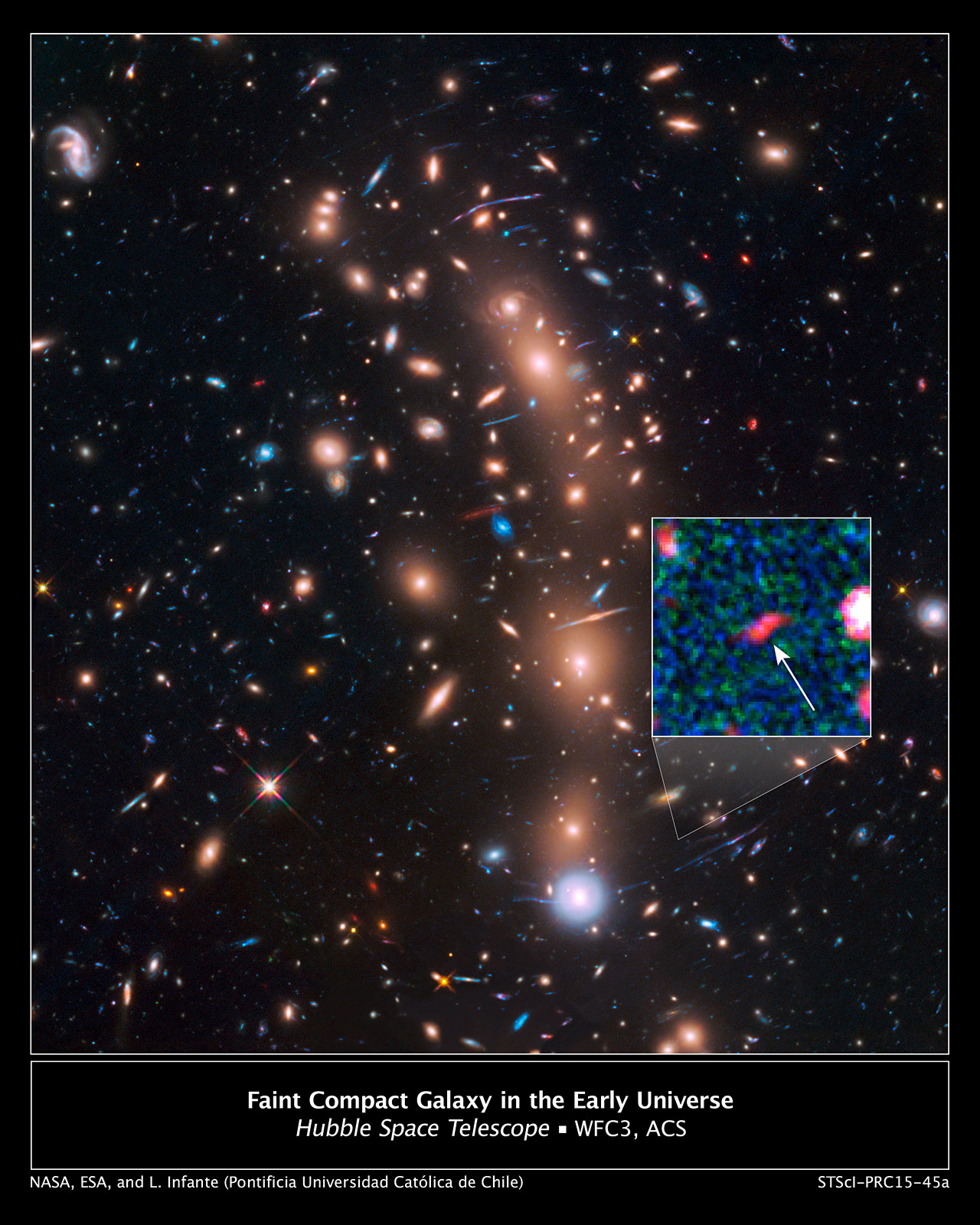
Very massive cluster of galaxies, MACS0416.1−2403, located roughly 4 billion light-years away.

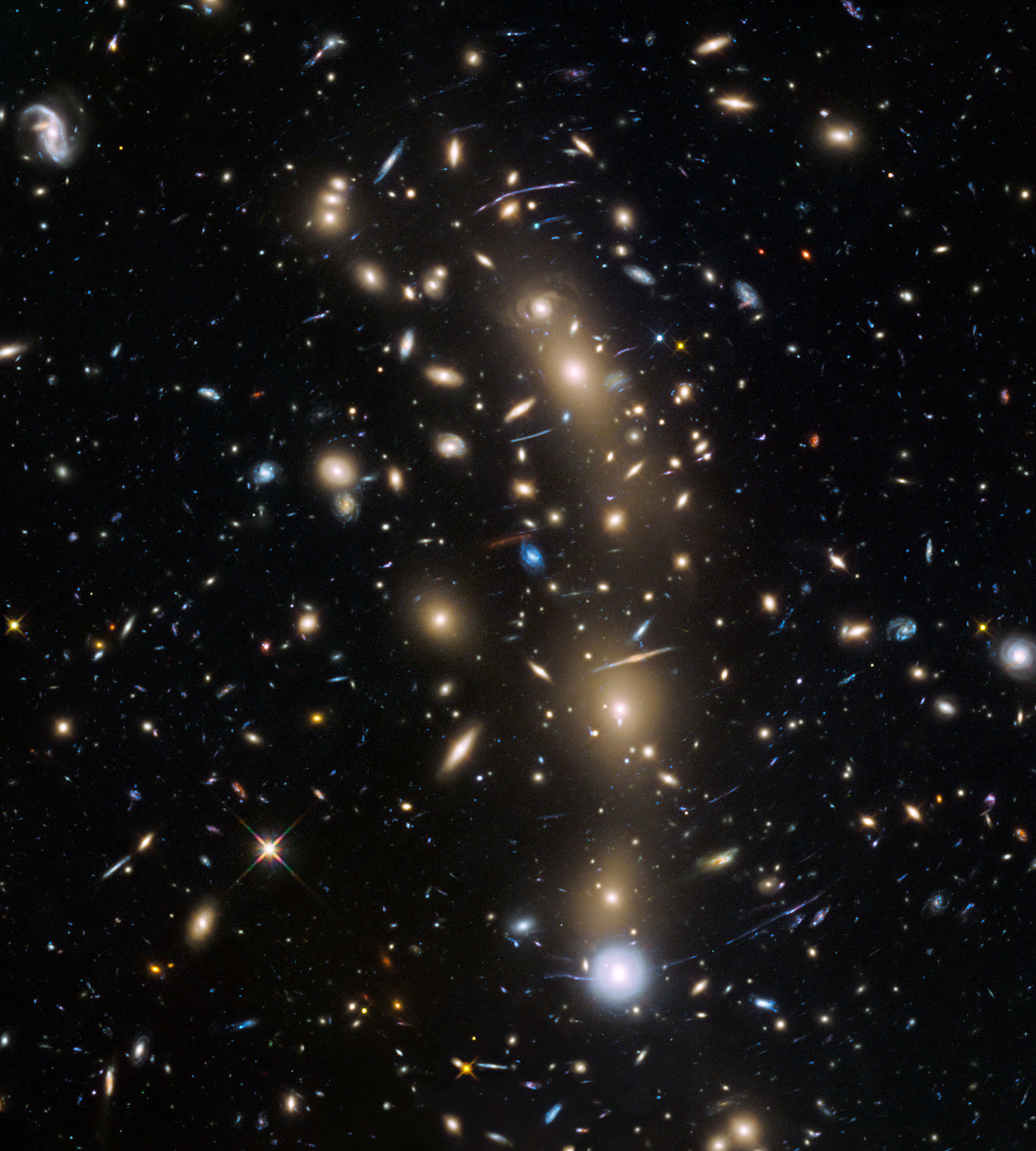
Galaxy cluster MACS J0416.1−2403 is one of six being studied by the Hubble Frontier Fields programme.

== See also ==
- Mothra (star)
