= MACS J1149.5+2223 =

Galaxy Cluster in Leo

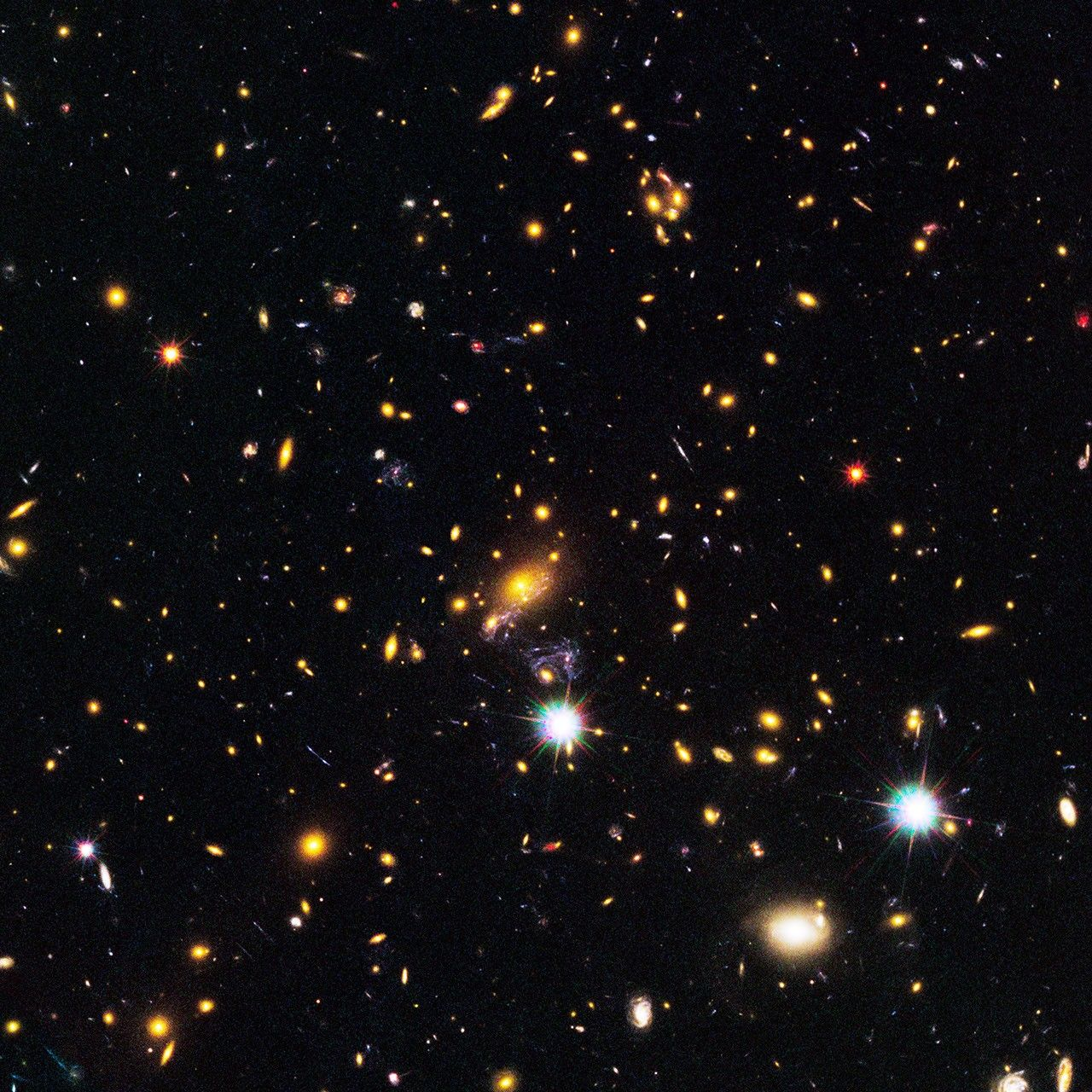
- Hubble Space Telescope image of MACS J1149.5+2223

Observation data (Epoch J2013.816)
- Right ascension: 11h 49m 35.7s
- Declination: +22° 23′ 54″
- Richness class: High
- Redshift: 0.544
- Distance: ~5 × 10^{9} light-years (1.5 × 10^{9} pc)
- ICM temperature: ~8–10 keV
- Binding mass: ~5 × 10^{14} M☉ (M200), ~7 × 10^{14} M☉ (M500) M_{☉}

MACS J1149.5+2223 is a massive galaxy cluster located approximately 5 billion light-years from Earth in the constellation Leo. This cluster is notable for its strong gravitational lensing effect, which magnifies and distorts light from background celestial objects, allowing astronomers to observe extremely distant galaxies and transient phenomena.

== Description ==
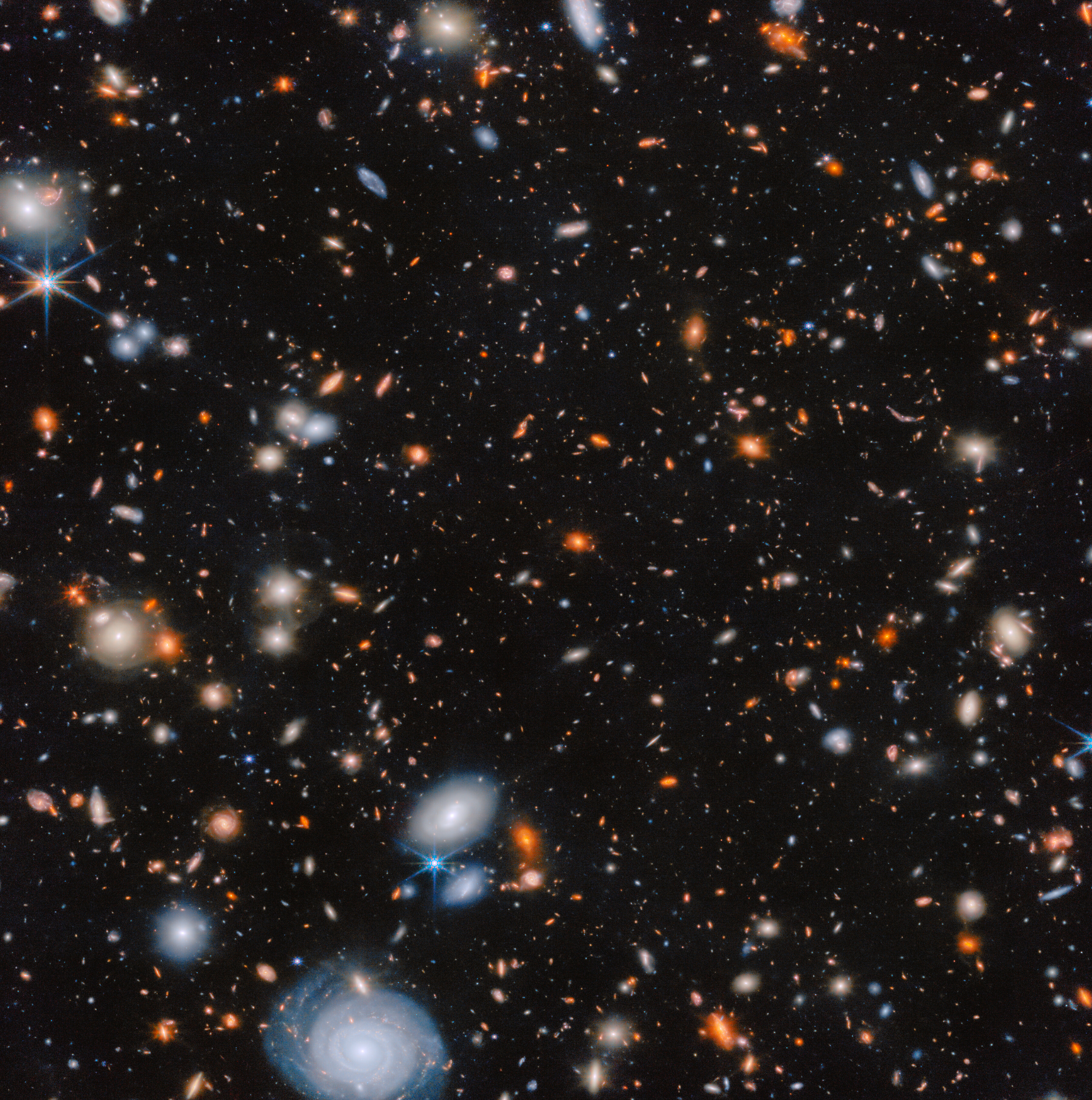
A portion of MACS J1149.5+2223 imaged by the James Webb Space Telescope

One of the most significant discoveries made using MACS J1149.5+2223 was the detection of Lensed Star 1 (LS1), also known as Icarus. This was the most distant individual star ever observed at the time of its discovery in 2018. The gravitational lensing effect of the cluster magnified the star's light, making it visible despite being located over 9 billion light-years away.

Additionally, the galaxy cluster played a crucial role in the observation of Supernova Refsdal. This supernova, first detected in 2014, was notable because gravitational lensing created multiple images of the explosion, providing a unique opportunity to test models of gravitational lensing and dark matter distribution. The Hubble Space Telescope captured an image of Refsdal, which was publicly released on March 25, 2015.

The study of MACS J1149.5+2223 continues to offer valuable insights into the nature of dark matter, the expansion of the universe, and the formation of galaxies in the early cosmos. It is frequently studied as part of deep-field observations, including those conducted by the James Webb Space Telescope.

== Image gallery ==
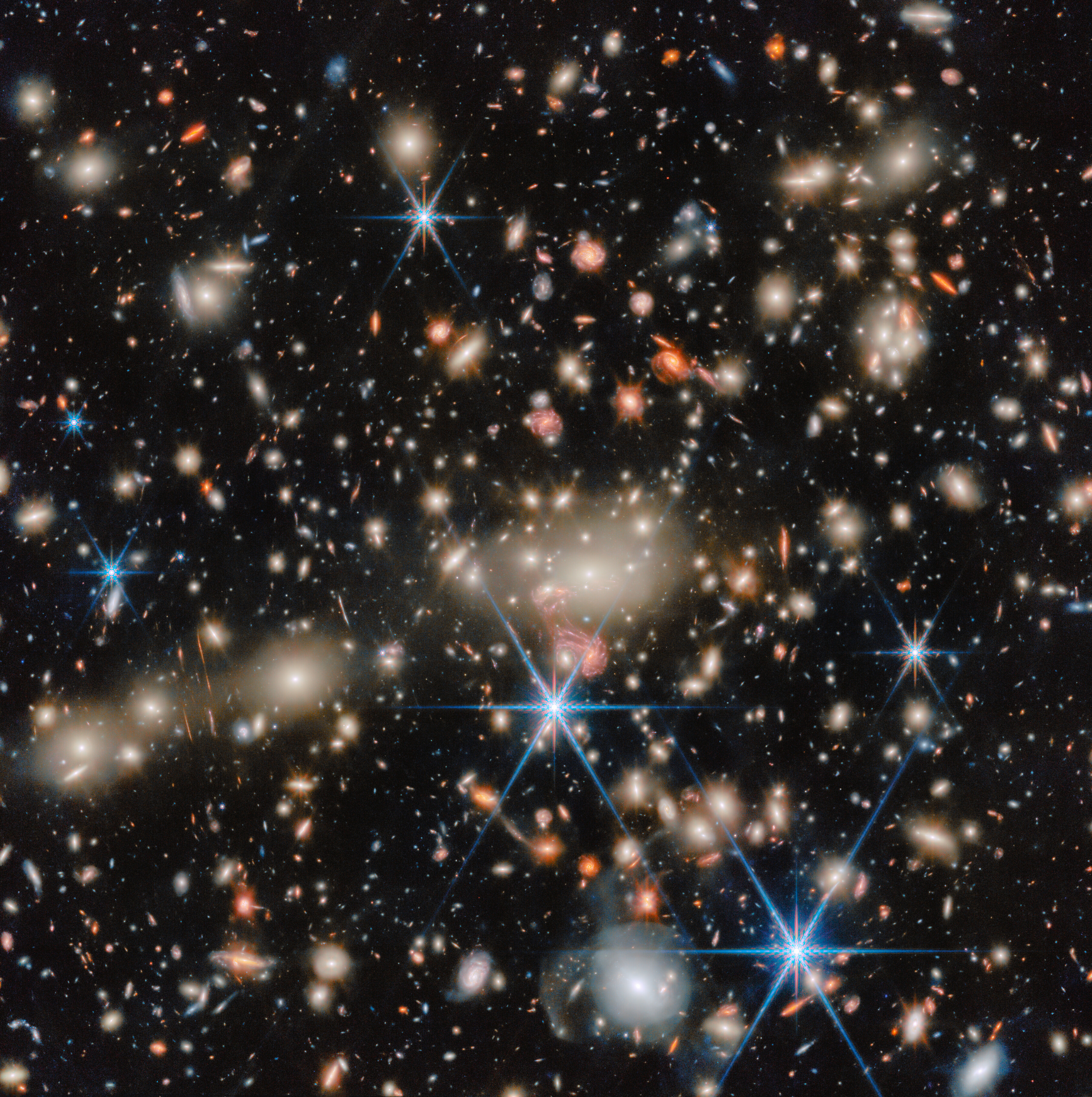
A portion of MACS J1149.5+2223 imaged by the James Webb Space Telescope
