= Earendel (astronomical object) =

Distant star or star cluster

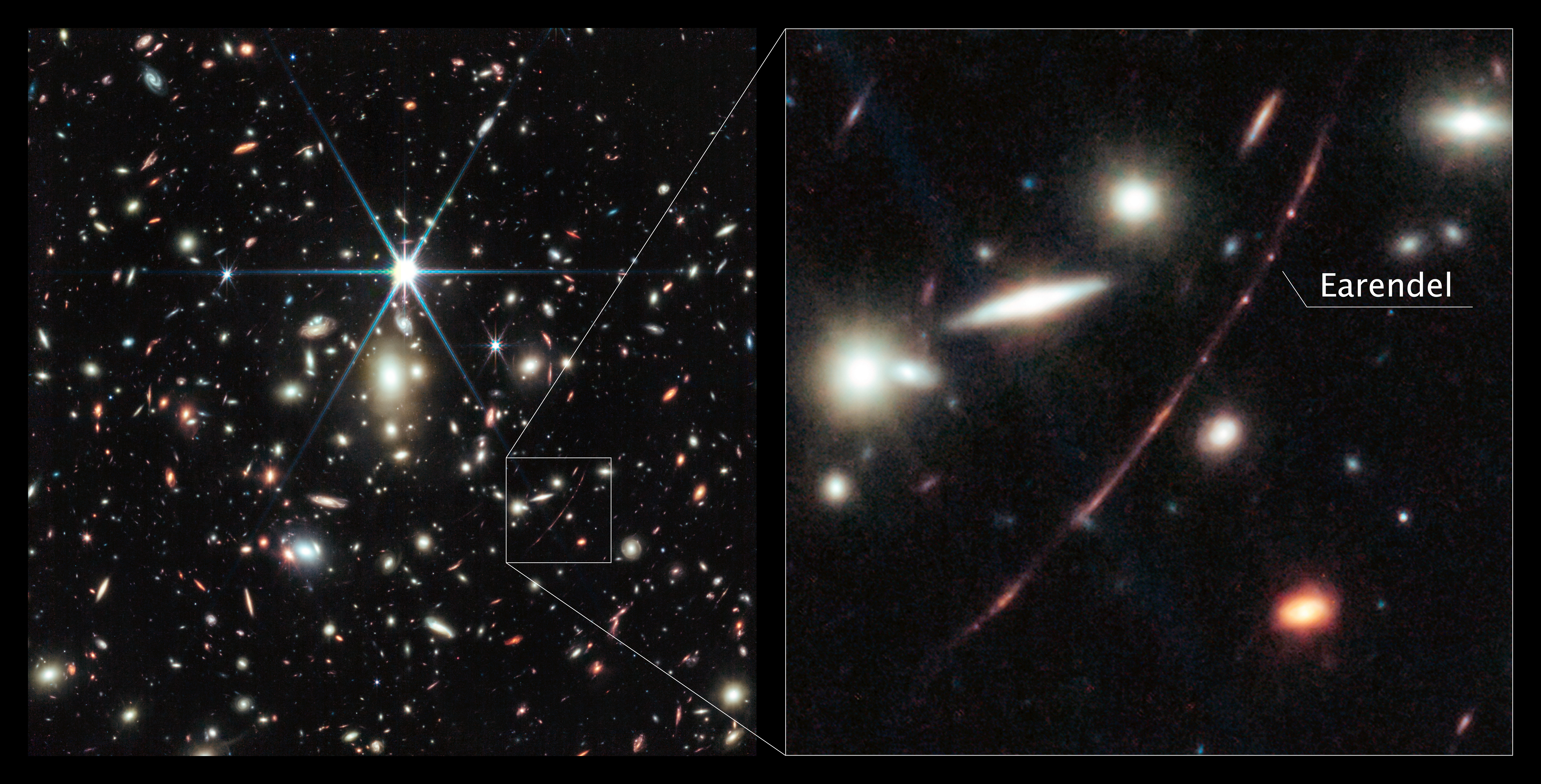
- James Webb Space Telescope image of galaxy cluster WHL0137-08 and Earendel

Observation data Epoch J2000 Equinox ICRS
- Constellation: Cetus
- Right ascension: 01^{h} 37^{m} 23.232^{s}
- Declination: −08° 27′ 52.20″

Characteristics
- Spectral type: B
- Apparent magnitude (F435W): 27.2
- Variable type: Luminous blue variable

Astrometry
Distance	28 billion (Note: co-moving distance) ly

Details

if a single star
Mass	20–200 M_{☉}
Radius	103–393 R_{☉}
Luminosity	631,000–3,981,000 L_{☉}
Temperature	13,000–16,000 K

if a binary (parameters highly uncertain)
Radius	component 1: 23 R_{☉} component 2: 184 R_{☉}
Luminosity	component 1: 631,000 L_{☉} component 2: 200,000 L_{☉}
Temperature	component 1: 34,000 K component 2: 9,000 K

Other designations
- Earendel

Earendel, designated WHL0137-LS, is a star cluster or a star located in the constellation of Cetus. Discovered in 2022 with the Hubble Space Telescope, it has a comoving distance of 28 billion light-years (8.6 billion parsecs), making it the most distant known star if it is a single object. The previous farthest known star, MACS J1149 Lensed Star 1, also known as Icarus, at a comoving distance of 14.4 billion light-years (4.4 billion parsecs), was discovered by Hubble in 2018. However, further observations from the James Webb Space Telescope (JWST) in the 2020s revealed that Earendel is more likely a star cluster. Objects like Earendel can be observed at cosmological distances thanks to the large magnification factors afforded by gravitational lensing, which can exceed 1,000. Other candidates stars have been observed through this technique, such as Godzilla, although controversies remain about their true nature.

== Observation ==
Earendel's discovery by the Hubble Space Telescope (HST) was reported on 30 March 2022. The object was detectable due to gravitational lensing caused by the presence of the galaxy cluster WHL0137-08 between it and the Earth, concentrating the light from the object. Computer simulations of the lensing effect suggest that Earendel's brightness was magnified between one thousand and forty thousand times. The dates of Hubble's exposure to the object's light were 7 June 2016, 17 July 2016, 4 November 2019, and 27 November 2019.

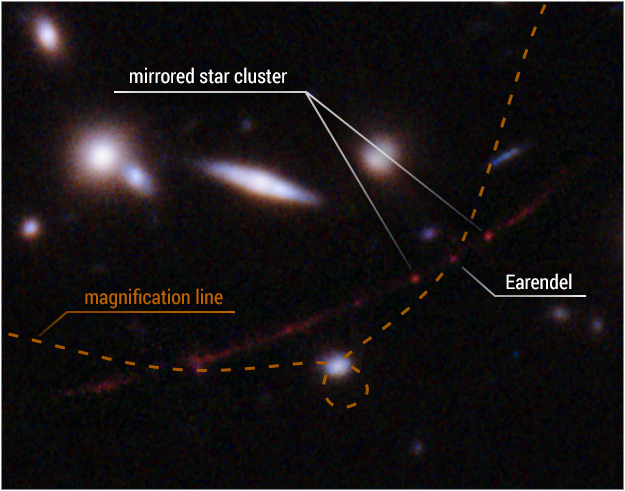
Earendel imaged by the Hubble Space Telescope

The object was nicknamed Earendel by the discoverers, derived from the Old English name for 'morning star' or 'rising light'. Eärendil is also the name of a half-elven character in one of J. R. R. Tolkien's books, The Silmarillion, who travelled through the sky with a radiant jewel that appeared as bright as a star. NASA astronomer Michelle Thaller confirmed that the reference to Tolkien was intentional. The object's host galaxy, WHL0137-zD1, was nicknamed "Sunrise Arc", because gravitational lensing distorted its light into a long crescent.

Further observations by Hubble and the James Webb Space Telescope (JWST) have been proposed to better define the properties of the star. JWST's higher sensitivity is expected to allow the analysis of Earendel's stellar spectra and determine whether it is actually a single star. The spectral analysis would reveal the presence of elements heavier than hydrogen and helium, if any.

On 30 July 2022, an image of Earendel was captured by the JWST during its first imaging campaign of the object.

On 8 August 2023, the colors of Earendel were detected, and an image was captured by both the Hubble and Webb telescopes. Based on Webb's NIRCam data, Earendel is a "massive B-type star more than twice as hot as our Sun, and about a million times more luminous". Webb's observations revealed hints of a cooler, redder companion star.

However, the authors of a 2025 study "estimate the magnification of Earendel to be μ = 43–67, significantly lower than previously proposed and thus calling into question its classification as a star." Spectroscopic fitting using JWST data indicates that Earendel is most likely a star cluster, or more specifically a metal-poor globular cluster progenitor, rather than a single star system, although the latter is not yet ruled out.

The original study suggested that Earendel must be physically very small < 0.3 parsec following the analysis of lensing near the caustic cast by the foreground galaxy cluster lens. However, a new 2025 study pointed out that this size constraint should be relaxed by up to ten fold as a population of sub-galactic dark matter halos likely exist and act as lens perturbers, as predicted for Cold Dark Matter. This aligns with the star cluster interpretation.

== Physical properties ==
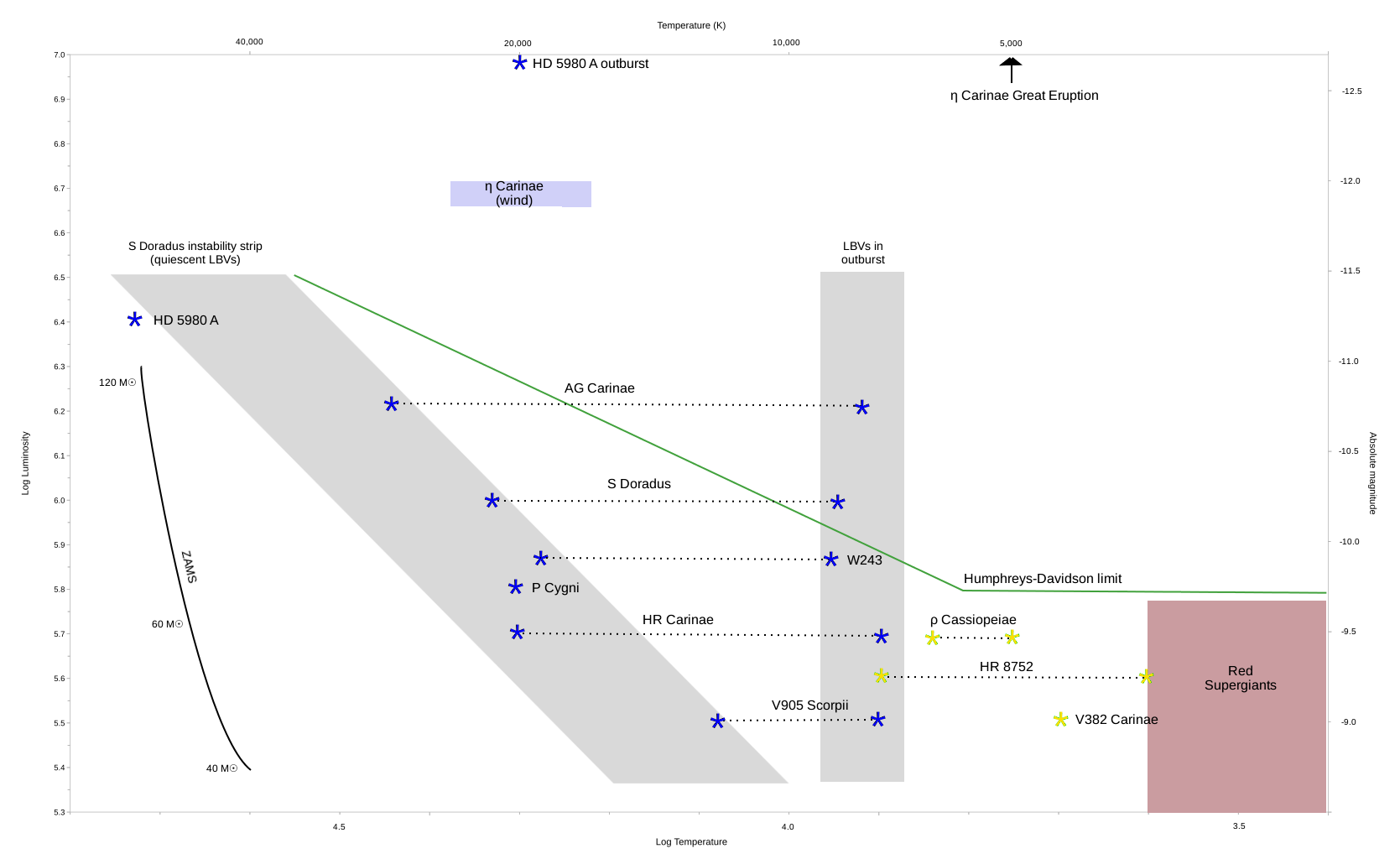
Upper portion of H-R Diagram showing the location of the S Doradus instability strip and the location of LBV outbursts. Main sequence is the thin sloping line on the lower left. (Earendel doesn't appear in this HR diagram)

The light detected from Earendel was emitted 900 million years after the Big Bang. The star has been determined to have a 6.2±0.1 redshift, meaning the light from Earendel reached Earth 12.9 billion years later. Due to the expansion of the universe, the star's observed position is now 28 billion light-years away. The previous most distant star, MACS J1149 Lensed Star 1, has a redshift of 1.49, and is now 14.4 billion light-years away.

If it is a single star, Earendel has a temperature of 13,000–16,000 K and a luminosity of 631,000–3,981,000 L_{☉}, depending on the magnification. It is possible that Earendel might not be a single star as the spectral energy distribution of Earendel has a strong Balmer break, which is characteristic of stars with temperatures below 13,000 K and a blue UV slope which is present in stars with temperatures above 20,000 K. It is possible that Earendel is a binary with two components, where one is more luminous and much hotter (34,000 K) than the other one (9,000 K). Due to the limited amount of data, the parameters are not well constrained. If two stars are in the system, they could have different magnifications, which makes the parameters even more uncertain.

== See also ==
- List of the most distant astronomical objects
- List of star extremes
- List of most distant stars
