= Quyllur (star) =

Red supergiant

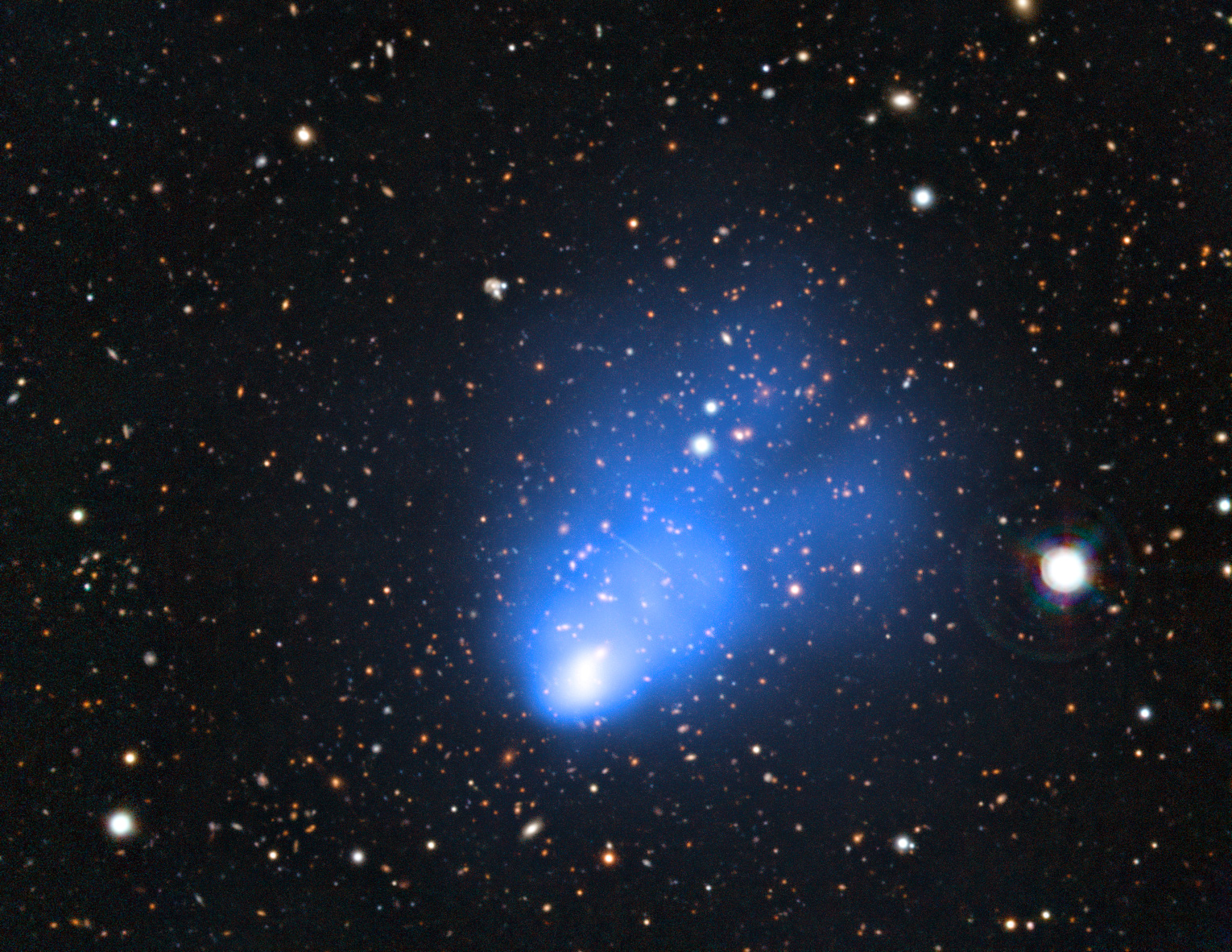
El Gordo, the galaxy cluster where Quyllur is located.

Quyllur is a red supergiant (RSG) located in the galaxy cluster of El Gordo. It is likely the first red supergiant star at cosmological distances and has an estimated radius of 965 solar radii, making it one of the largest known stars.

== See also ==
- List of most distant stars
