= SN Refsdal =

Supernova that has been lensed

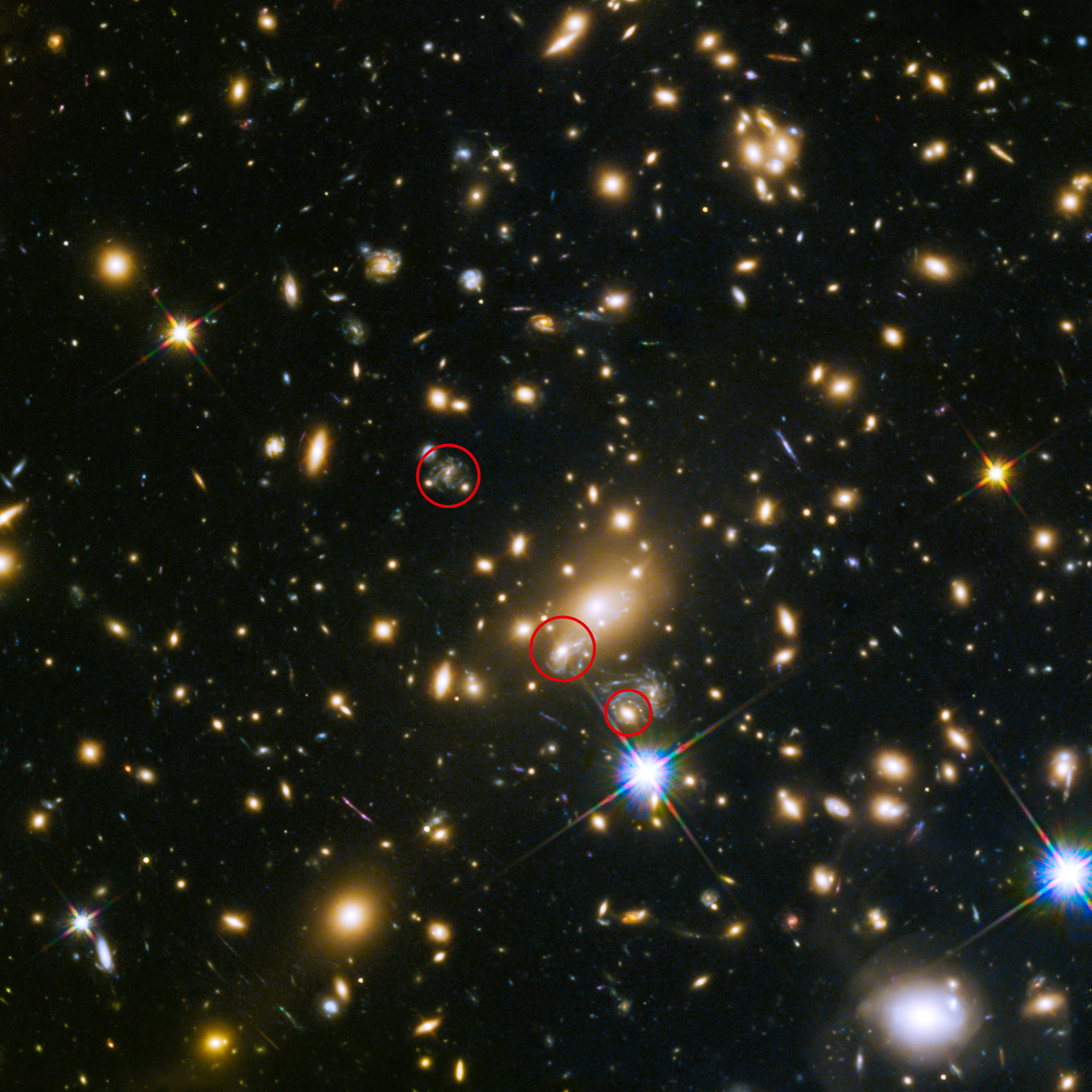
- SN Refsdal (inset picture) and galaxy cluster MACS J1149.5+2223
- Event type: Supernova
- Type Ia
- Date: c. 9.34 billion years ago (discovered 11 November 2014 by the Hubble Space Telescope)
- Constellation: Leo
- Right ascension: 11^{h} 49^{m} 35.45^{s}
- Declination: 22° 23′ 44.84″
- Epoch: J2000
- Distance: c. 14.4 billion ly
- Host: SP 1149
- Notable features: First multiply-lensed supernova
- Related media on Commons

SN Refsdal is the first detected multiply-lensed supernova, visible within the field of the galaxy cluster MACS J1149.5+2223. It was named after Norwegian astrophysicist Sjur Refsdal, who, in 1964, first proposed using time-delayed images from a lensed supernova to study the expansion of the universe. The observations were made using the Hubble Space Telescope.

== Einstein cross ==
The host galaxy of SN Refsdal is at a redshift of 1.49, corresponding to a comoving distance of 14.4 billion light-years and a lookback time of 9.34 billion years. The multiple images are arranged around the elliptical galaxy at z = 0.54 in a cross-shaped pattern, also known as an "Einstein cross".

== Reappearance ==
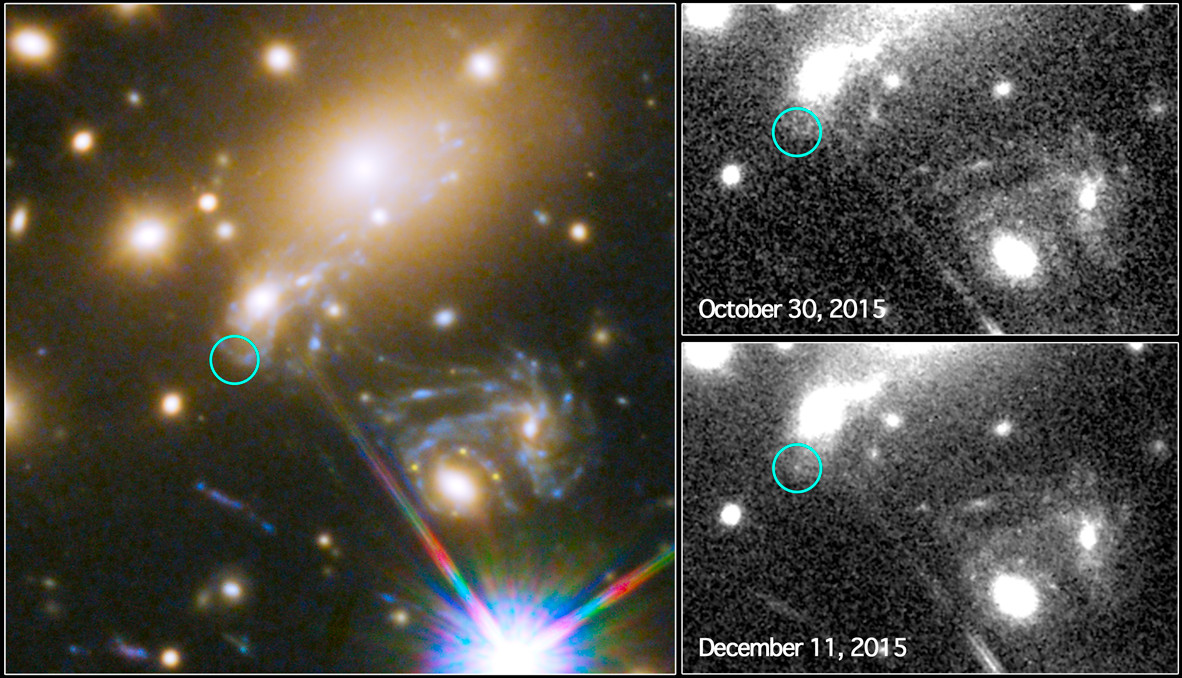
The image to the left shows a part of the deep field observation of the galaxy cluster MACS J1149.5+2223 from the Frontier Fields programme. The circle indicates the predicted position of the newest appearance of the supernova. To the lower right, the Einstein cross event from late 2014 is visible. The image on the top right shows observations by Hubble from October 2015, taken at the beginning of the observation programme to detect the newest appearance of the supernova. The image on the lower right shows the discovery of the supernova on 11 December 2015, as predicted by several different models.

After the discovery of the supernova, astronomers predicted that they would be able to see it again in about one year, after the four images had faded away. This is because the initially observed four-image pattern was only one component of the lensing display. The supernova may also have appeared as a single image some 40–50 years ago elsewhere in the cluster field.

The supernova reappeared at the predicted position between 14 November and 11 December 2015 (with the exact date being uncertain by approximately one month which is the interval between two consecutive Hubble observations), in excellent agreement with the blind model predictions made before the reappearance was observed. The time delay between the original quadruplet observed in 2014 and the latest appearance of the supernova in 2015 was used to infer the value of the Hubble constant. This is the first time this technique, originally suggested by Refsdal, has been applied to supernovae.

Using measurements from SN Refsdal and galaxy cluster lens models, astronomers found that the Hubble constant has value H_{0} = 66.6+4.1
−3.3 km s^{−1} Mpc^{−1}.

== Other multiply-lensed supernova ==
Other reported multiply-lensed supernova are iPTF16geu, SN Requiem (SN 2016jka), SN Zwicky (SN 2022qmx), Chen et al. SN, SN H0pe, SN 2022riv, and SN Winny (SN 2025wny).

Besides SN Refsdal, SN H0pe has also been used to measure the value of the Hubble constant using the relative delay in the arrival between images.

== See also ==
- Einstein Cross, the gravitationally lensed quasar that gave rise to the term "Einstein cross"
- How One Supernova Measured The Universe
