= Mothra (star) =

Binary system in the constellation Eridanus

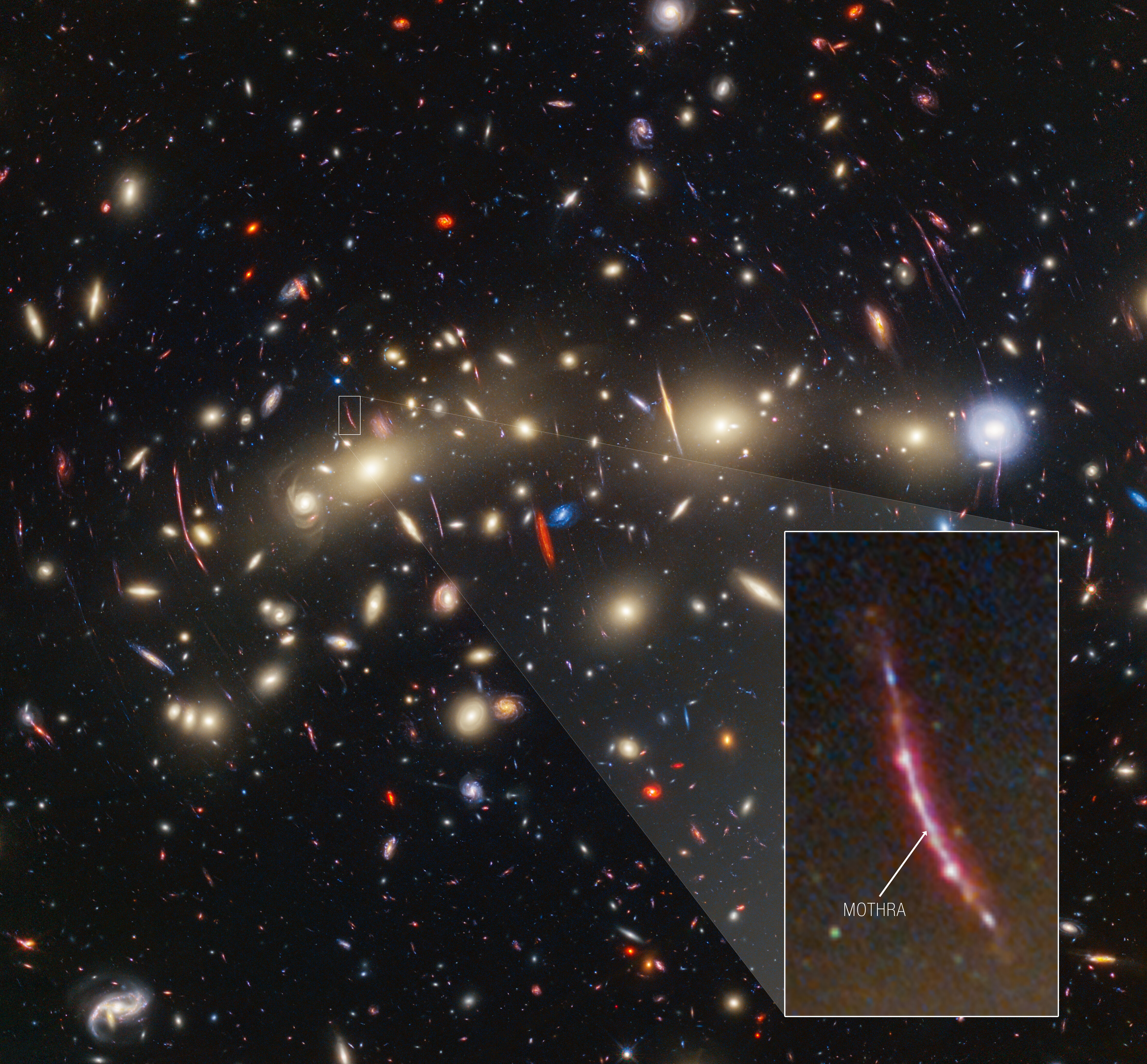
- Image of the star Mothra within MACS J0416.1−2403

Observation data Epoch J2000.0 Equinox ICRS
- Constellation: Eridanus
- Right ascension: 04^{h} 16^{m} 08.84^{s}
- Declination: −24° 03′ 58.6″

Characteristics

A
- Evolutionary stage: Yellow hypergiant

B
- Evolutionary stage: Blue supergiant

Astrometry
Distance	17.6 billion ly

Details

A
Luminosity	50,000 L_{☉}
Temperature	5,250 K

B
Luminosity	125,000 L_{☉}
Temperature	14,000 K

Other designations
- EMO J041608.838-240358.60, EMO J041608.8-240358

Mothra (also known as EMO J041608.838-240358.60) is a binary system with a possible transient, in the constellation of Eridanus. Mothra is in one of the strongly lensed galaxies behind the galaxy cluster MACS J0416.1−2403, nicknamed the "Christmas Tree Galaxy Cluster".

== Location ==
The Mothra system is located at redshift z = 2.091 or about 10.5 billion light years away, and is notable for being one of the most distant star systems ever discovered.

The Mothra system is also designated LS1 (lensed star 1). Mothra and its host galaxy are behind the galaxy cluster MACS J0416.1-2403. The extreme magnification of Mothra is believed to be produced by an undetected millilens in the galaxy cluster, possibly a small globular cluster or small clump of dark matter, and very close to the line of sight to Mothra. The mass of this millilens is constrained to be between 10,000 M_{☉} and 1,000,000 M_{☉}. This is among the smallest substructures detected at cosmological distances via gravitational lensing.

== Physical properties ==
Mothra consists of two supergiant stars, a yellow supergiant or a yellow hypergiant, and a blue supergiant. As of 2026, the orbital characteristics of the Mothra system is unknown.

The primary component of the Mothra system is classified as a yellow supergiant or yellow hypergiant.

Mothra A has a size of 271 R_{☉}, a luminosity of 50,000 L_{☉}, a temperature of 5,250 K, and has an initial mass of 15 M_{☉}.

The secondary component of the Mothra system is classified as a blue supergiant.

Mothra B has a size of 60 R_{☉}, a luminosity of 125,000 L_{☉}, and a temperature of 14,000 K.

The star was nicknamed Mothra by Spanish astrophysicist Jose Diego as a reference to its monstrous nature.

== See also ==
- List of most distant stars
