= Hedorah (star) =

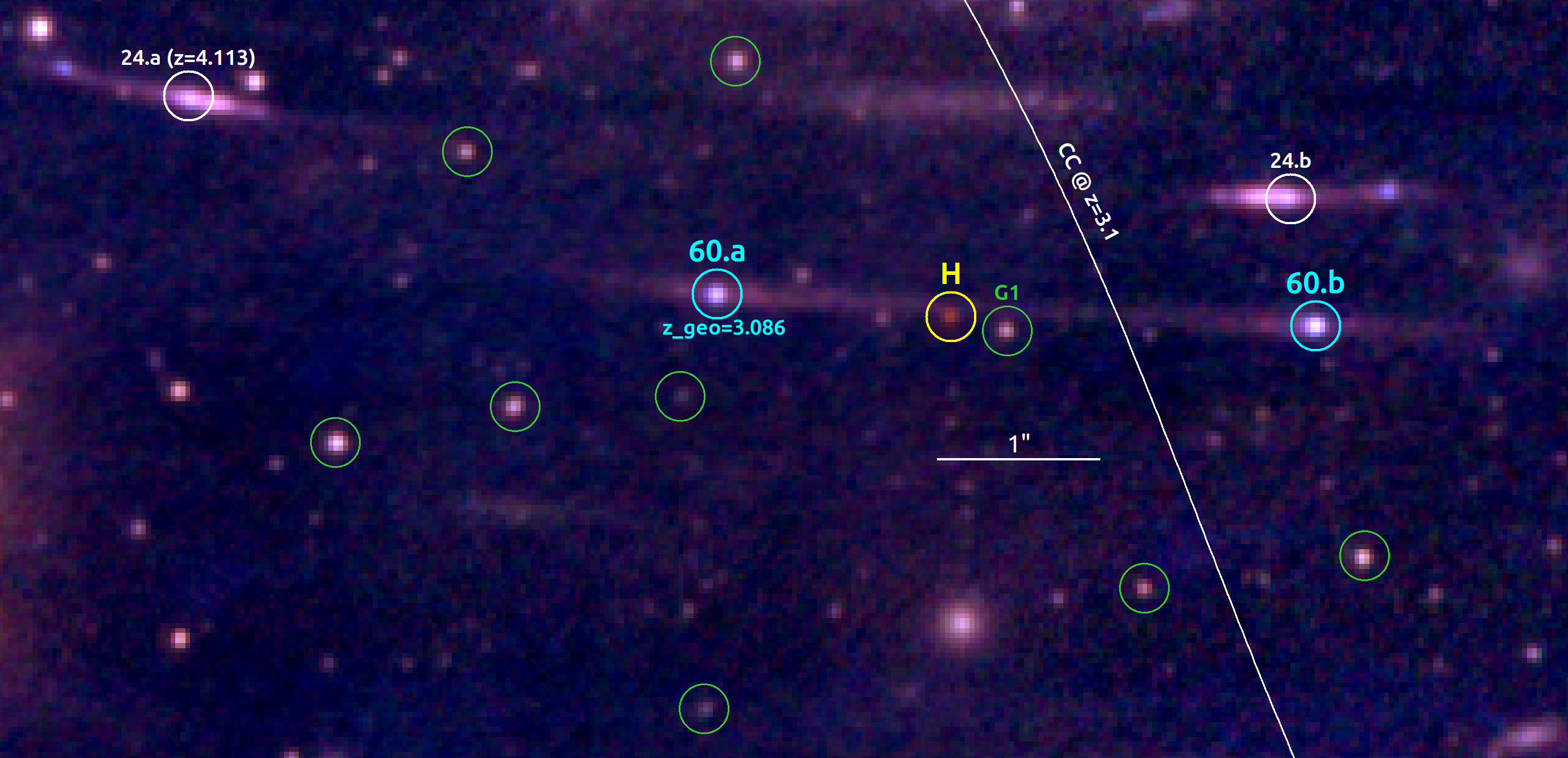
Hedorah star can seen in the image as marked with H

Hedorah is a lensed star candidate magnified by the galaxy cluster Abell S1063. It is the first candidate to be a lensed yellow supergiant star, and possibly a Cepheid variable. The redshift of the host galaxy is spectroscopically confirmed to be z=3.72.

== See also ==
- List of most distant stars
