= BO Carinae =

Star in the constellation Carina

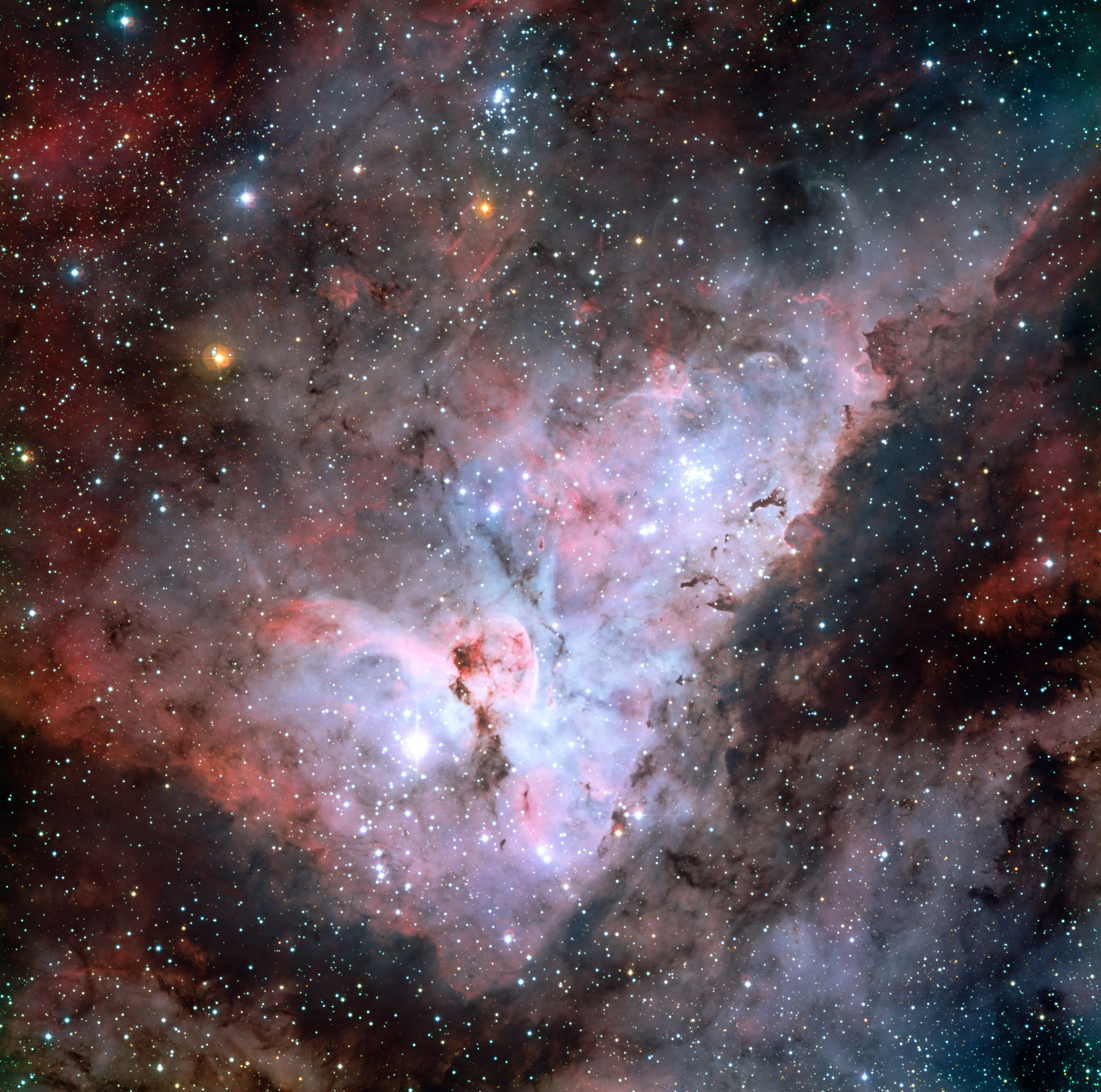
- BO Carinae is the brightest red star, towards upper left, in this image of the Carina Nebula. Credit: ESO

Observation data Epoch J2000 Equinox J2000
- Constellation: Carina
- Right ascension: 10^{h} 46^{m} 50.658^{s}
- Declination: 59° 29′ 19.32″
- Apparent magnitude (V): 7.18 - 8.50

Characteristics
- Spectral type: M4 Ib
- Variable type: Lc

Astrometry
Proper motion (μ)	RA: −7.334±0.027 mas/yr Dec.: −1.420±0.028 mas/yr
Parallax (π)	0.6020±0.0259 mas
Distance	5,400 ± 200 ly (1,660 ± 70 pc)
Absolute magnitude (M_{V})	−5.53

Details
Radius	790 R_{☉}
Luminosity	78,000 L_{☉}
Temperature	3,525 K

Other designations
- BO Car, IDS 10419−5858, IRAS 10438−5913, 2MASS J10455065−5929193, AAVSO 1042−58, SAO 238447, CD−58 3547, HD 93420

Database references
SIMBAD	data

BO Carinae, also known as HD 93420, is an irregular variable star in the constellation Carina.

BO Car has a maximum apparent magnitude of +7.18. Its distance and membership is uncertain, but its possible membership to the star cluster Trumpler 15 allows a distance estimate of approximately 2,500 parsecs (8,150 light-years). The Gaia Data Release 2 parallax of 0.73±0.08 mas suggests a closer distance, but the value is considered unreliable due to excess astrometric noise.

BO Car is a red supergiant of spectral type M4Ib with an effective temperature of 3,525 K, a radius of 790 solar radii. Its bolometric luminosity is 78,000 L_{☉}. Mass-loss is on the order of 0.3×10^{−9} solar masses per year.

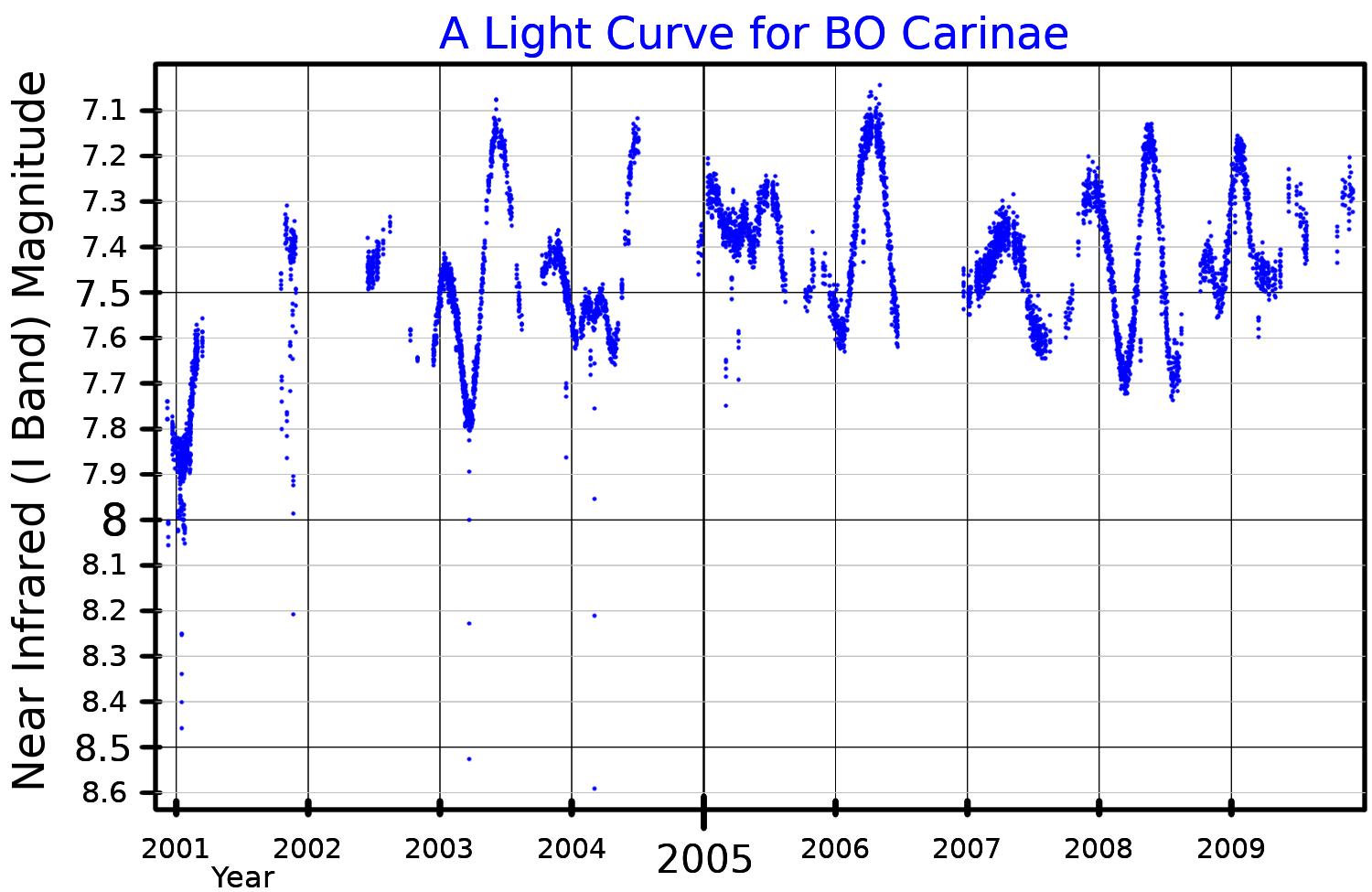
An I band (near infrared) light curve for BO Carinae, plotted from ASAS data

In 1919, William Matthew Worssell of the Union Observatory announced that the star, then known as CPD-58 2683, is a variable star. It was given its variable star designation, BO Carinae, in 1921. Billed as an irregular variable like TZ Cassiopeiae or V528 Carinae; its apparent brightness fluctuates between magnitude +7.18 and +8.50 without clear periodicity. Some observers have found BO Car not to be variable, but more extensive studies find small amplitude variations with a possible period of 145 days.

Multiple star catalogues list an 11th-magnitude star as a companion to BO Car. The separation was 14.2″ in 2015, and slowly increasing. The companion is a distant blue giant.

== See also ==
- RT Carinae
- V528 Carinae
- EV Carinae
- List of largest known stars
