= H Puppis =

The Bayer designations h Puppis and H Puppis are distinct. They can refer to three stars in the constellation Puppis:

- h^{1} Puppis (NS Puppis), an irregular variable supergiant
- h^{2} Puppis (HD 69142), a K-type giant
- H Puppis (HD 53811), an A-type subgiant
