= ST Camelopardalis =

Star in the constellation Camelopardalis

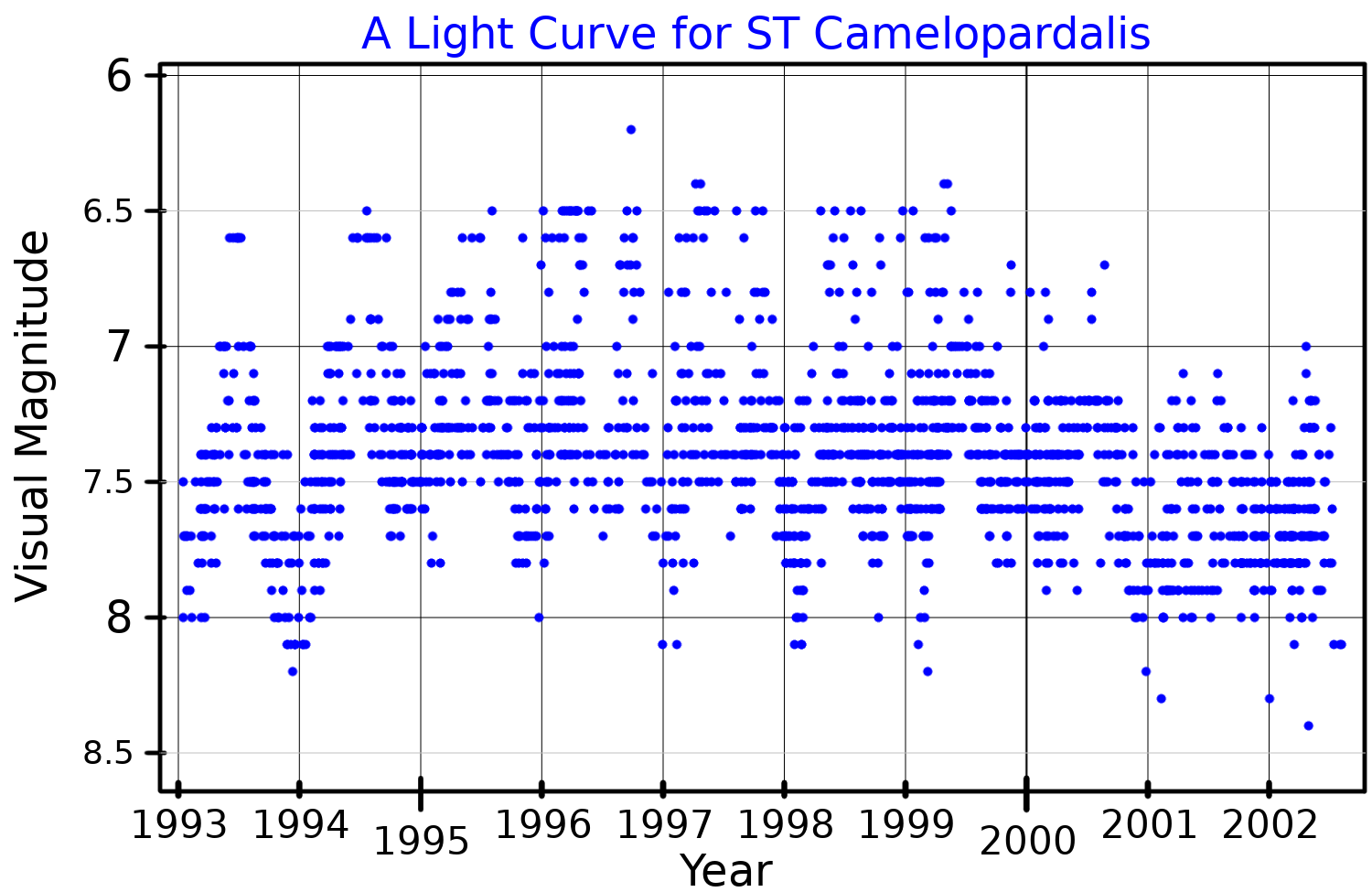
- The visual band light curve of ST Camelopardalis, from AAVSO data

Observation data Epoch J2000.0 Equinox ICRS
- Constellation: Camelopardalis
- Right ascension: 04^{h} 051^{m} 13.348^{s}
- Declination: +68° 10′ 07.65″
- Apparent magnitude (V): 6.3 to 8.5

Characteristics
- Evolutionary stage: AGB
- Spectral type: C5,4(N5)
- B−V color index: +2.1
- Variable type: SRb

Astrometry
Proper motion (μ)	RA: −2.992±0.136 mas/yr Dec.: −3.237±0.185 mas/yr
Parallax (π)	1.6725±0.0989 mas
Distance	2,000 ± 100 ly (600 ± 40 pc)
Absolute magnitude (M_{V})	−1.232

Details
Radius	244 R_{☉}
Luminosity	4,478 L_{☉}
Temperature	3,388 K
Metallicity [Fe/H]	−0.1 dex

Other designations
- ST Camelopardalis, ST Cam, HD 20243, HIP 22552, BD+67°350

Database references
SIMBAD	data

ST Camelopardalis, abbreviated ST Cam, is a carbon star in the constellation of Camelopardalis. It has a radius of 244 R_{☉}. Its apparent magnitude ranges from 6.3 to 8.5, so under excellent observing conditions, it could be very faintly visible to the naked eye when it is near maximum brightness.

In 1902, Thomas William Backhouse announced that ST Cam was a low amplitude variable star with a long or irregular period. It was given its variable star designation in 1912.

ST Cam is a semiregular variable star. It is doubly periodic, with the two pulsation periods P0 and P1 being equal to 368.6 and 201 days respectively.

ST Cam is an AGB star, in the process of expelling its red giant envelope into space. Line emission from the 115 GHz rotational transition of carbon monoxide was detected in 1987 by Olofson et al. The width of the emission line indicated that ST Cam is surrounded by a circumstellar envelope expanding at 10 km/sec. Bergeat and Chevallier (2005) analyzed later molecular spectroscopy results, and derived an envelope expansion velocity of 9 km/sec, and a mass loss rate of 1.1 × 10^{−6} M_{☉} per year. Broadband emission from dust in the envelope was spatially resolved by the IRAS satellite in its 60 micron data. Dust was detected out to a distance of 3.1 arc minutes from the star, or about 1.8 light years assuming a distance to ST Cam of 600 pc.
