= Psi Virginis =

Variable star in the constellation Virgo

ψ Virginis
- Location of ψ Virginis (circled)

Observation data Epoch J2000 Equinox ICRS
- Constellation: Virgo
- Right ascension: 12^{h} 54^{m} 21.16342^{s}
- Declination: −09° 32′ 20.3783″
- Apparent magnitude (V): 4.73 - 4.96

Characteristics
- Spectral type: M3 IIICa-1
- U−B color index: +1.57
- B−V color index: +1.58
- Variable type: LB

Astrometry
Radial velocity (R_{v})	+12.82 km/s
Proper motion (μ)	RA: −18.08 mas/yr Dec.: −19.52 mas/yr
Parallax (π)	5.99±0.23 mas
Distance	540 ± 20 ly (167 ± 6 pc)
Absolute magnitude (M_{V})	−1.34

Details
Mass	3.95 M_{☉}
Radius	93 R_{☉}
Luminosity	3,548 L_{☉}
Surface gravity (log g)	1.05 cgs
Temperature	3,500 K
Metallicity [Fe/H]	−0.10 dex

Other designations
- ψ Vir, 40 Virginis, BD−08°3449, FK5 1335, HD 112142, HIP 62985, HR 4902, SAO 139033

Database references
SIMBAD	data

Psi Virginis (ψ Vir, ψ Virginis) is a suspected binary star system in the zodiac constellation of Virgo. It can be seen with the naked eye and has an apparent visual magnitude of about 4.8. Based upon the annual parallax shift of 5.99 milliarcseconds, the distance to this star is roughly 540 light years. The angular size of Psi Virginis was measured on December 26, 1975 during an occultation by the Moon, yielding the estimate 6.5±0.3 mas.

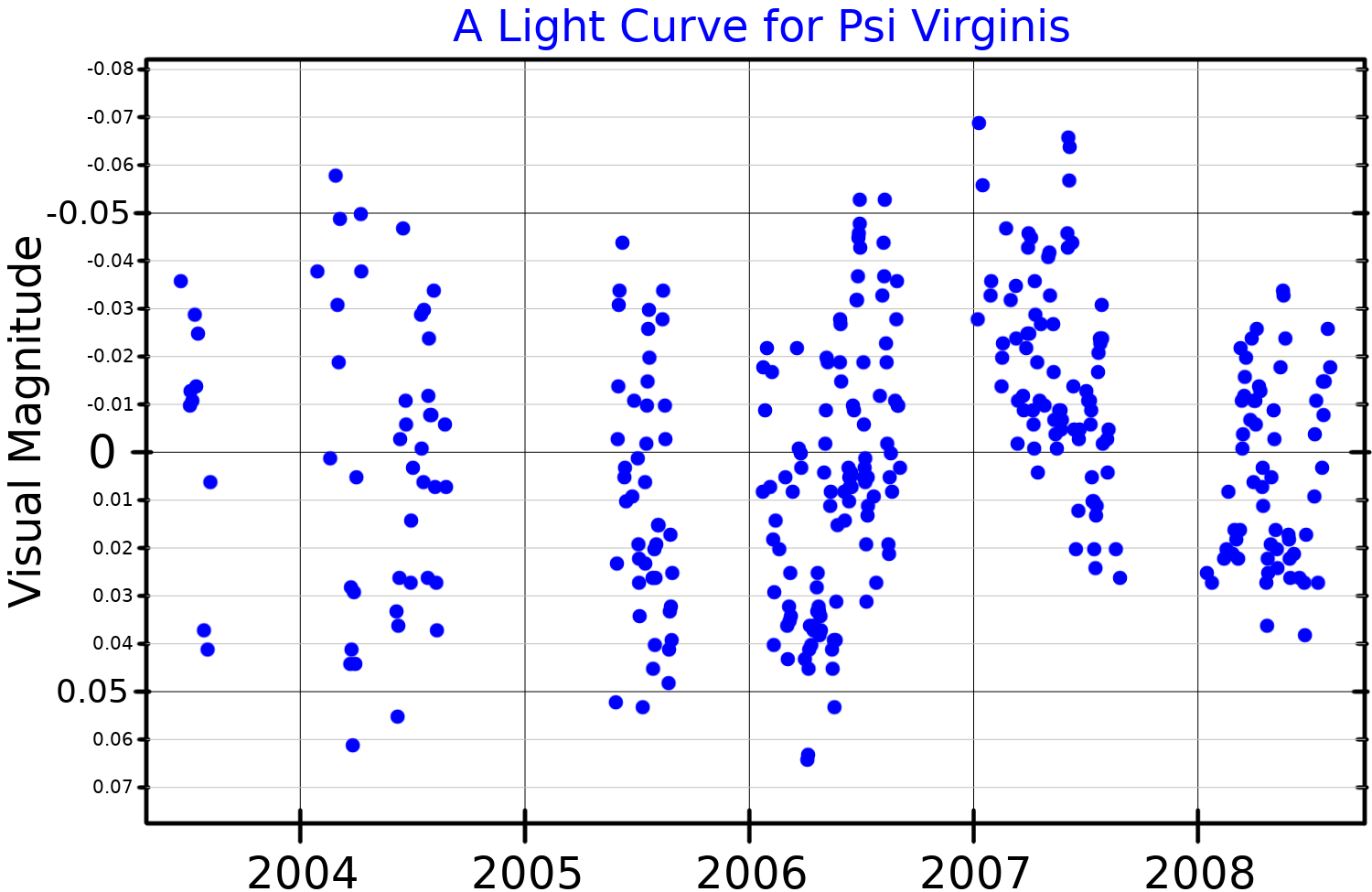
A visual band light curve for Psi Virginis, plotted from data published by Tabur et al. (2009)

The primary component is an evolved red giant star with a stellar classification of M3 IIICa-1. It is an irregular variable with seven measured pulsation periods ranging from 22.4 to 162.6 days, and amplitudes ranging up to 0.^{m}022. The star is a bright X-ray source with a luminosity of 21.58×10^{29} ergs s^{−1}. There is a magnitude 8.3 companion at an angular separation of 0.04 arcseconds.
