= HD 155035 =

Star in the constellation Ara

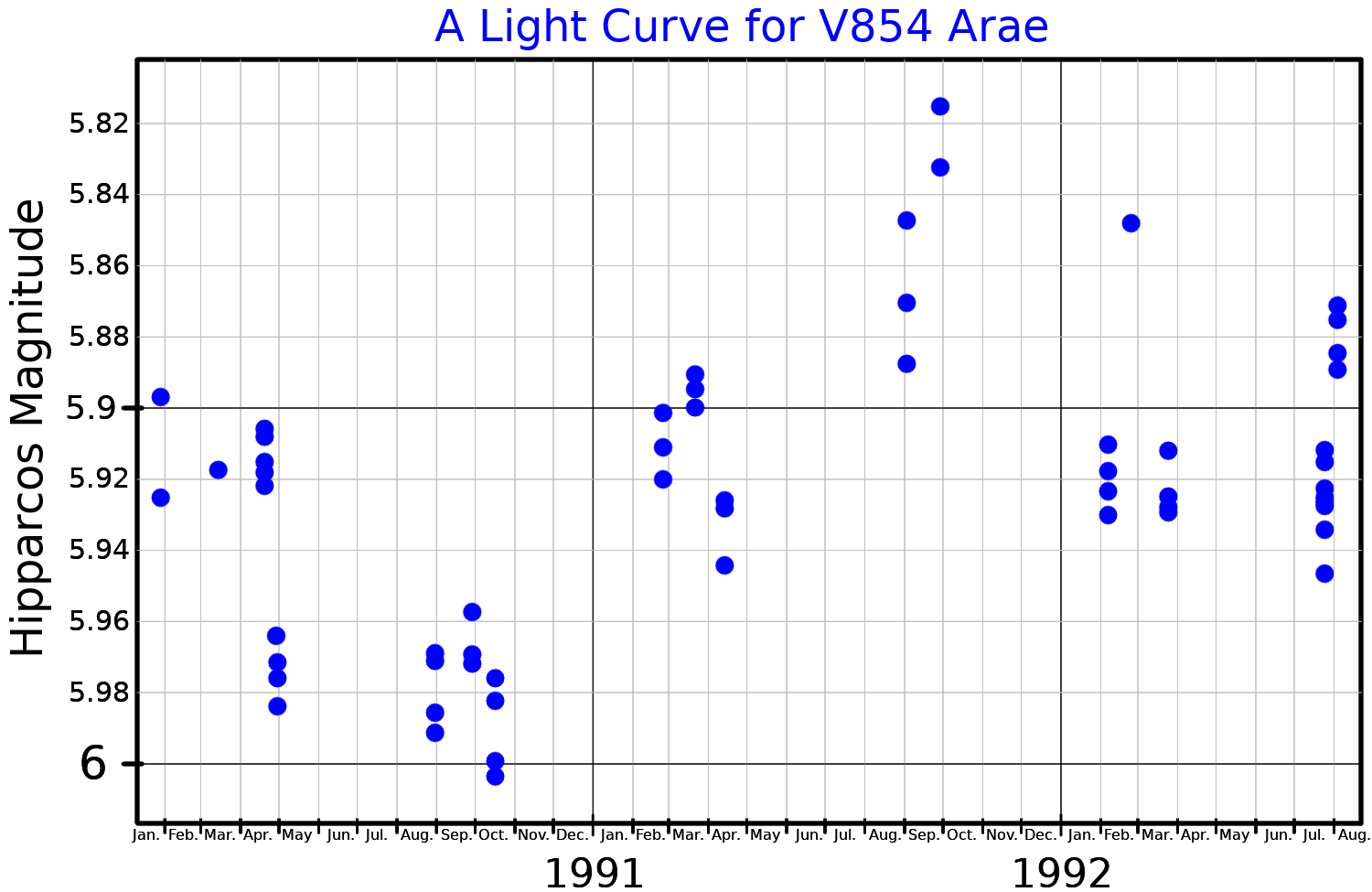
- A light curve for V854 Arae, plotted from Hipparcos data

Observation data Epoch J2000 Equinox J2000
- Constellation: Ara
- Right ascension: 17^{h} 11^{m} 38.68606^{s}
- Declination: −48° 52′ 24.2049″
- Apparent magnitude (V): 5.92

Characteristics
- Spectral type: M1.5 III
- B−V color index: +1.82
- Variable type: LB

Astrometry
Proper motion (μ)	RA: 7.600 mas/yr Dec.: –6.378 mas/yr
Parallax (π)	2.2444±0.0772 mas
Distance	1,450 ± 50 ly (450 ± 20 pc)

Details
Mass	4.07 M_{☉}
Radius	172 R_{☉}
Luminosity	3,454 L_{☉}
Temperature	3,675 K

Other designations
- V854 Arae, CD−48 11492, HD 155035, HIP 84105, HR 6374, SAO 227699, V854 Ara

Database references
SIMBAD	data

HD 155035 is a star in the constellation Ara, the Altar. It is located at a distance of approximately 1,450 light-years (450 parsecs) from Earth and has an apparent visual magnitude of 5.92, making it is faintly visible to the naked eye. This is a red giant star with a stellar classification of M1.5 III.

The Hipparcos data revealed that HD 155035 is a variable star. It was given its variable star designation, V854 Arae, in 1999. It's an irregular variable that changes brightness over an amplitude range of 0.12 magnitudes.
