= V528 Carinae =

Star in the constellation Carina

Observation data Epoch J2000 Equinox ICRS
- Constellation: Carina
- Right ascension: 11^{h} 03^{m} 06.15^{s}
- Declination: −60° 54′ 38.6″
- Apparent magnitude (V): 6.27 - 6.78

Characteristics
- Spectral type: M2 Ib:
- B−V color index: +2.04
- Variable type: Lc

Astrometry
Radial velocity (R_{v})	−27.80 km/s
Proper motion (μ)	RA: −7.639 mas/yr Dec.: +2.109 mas/yr
Parallax (π)	0.4504±0.0293 mas
Distance	7,200 ± 500 ly (2,200 ± 100 pc)
Absolute magnitude (M_{V})	−6.09

Details
Radius	700 R_{☉}
Luminosity	81,000 L_{☉}
Surface gravity (log g)	0.0 cgs
Temperature	3,700 K

Other designations
- V528 Car, CD−60°3327, HD 95950, HIP 54021, 2MASS J11030616−6054387, IRAS 11010−6038, WISE J110305.99−605438.7, SAO 251235

Database references
SIMBAD	data

V528 Carinae (V528 Car, HD 95950, HIP 54021) is a variable star in the constellation Carina.

V528 Carinae has an apparent visual magnitude that varies between about 6.3 and 6.8. When it is near its maximum brightness, it is very faintly visible to the naked eye under ideal observing conditions. It is a distant star but the exact distance is uncertain. The Hipparcos satellite gives a negative annual parallax and is not helpful, while the Gaia Data Release 3 parallax of 0.45 mas implies a distance of around 7,200 light years (2,200 parsecs). Assuming membership of the Carina OB2 membership would give a distance of about 1,830 parsecs.

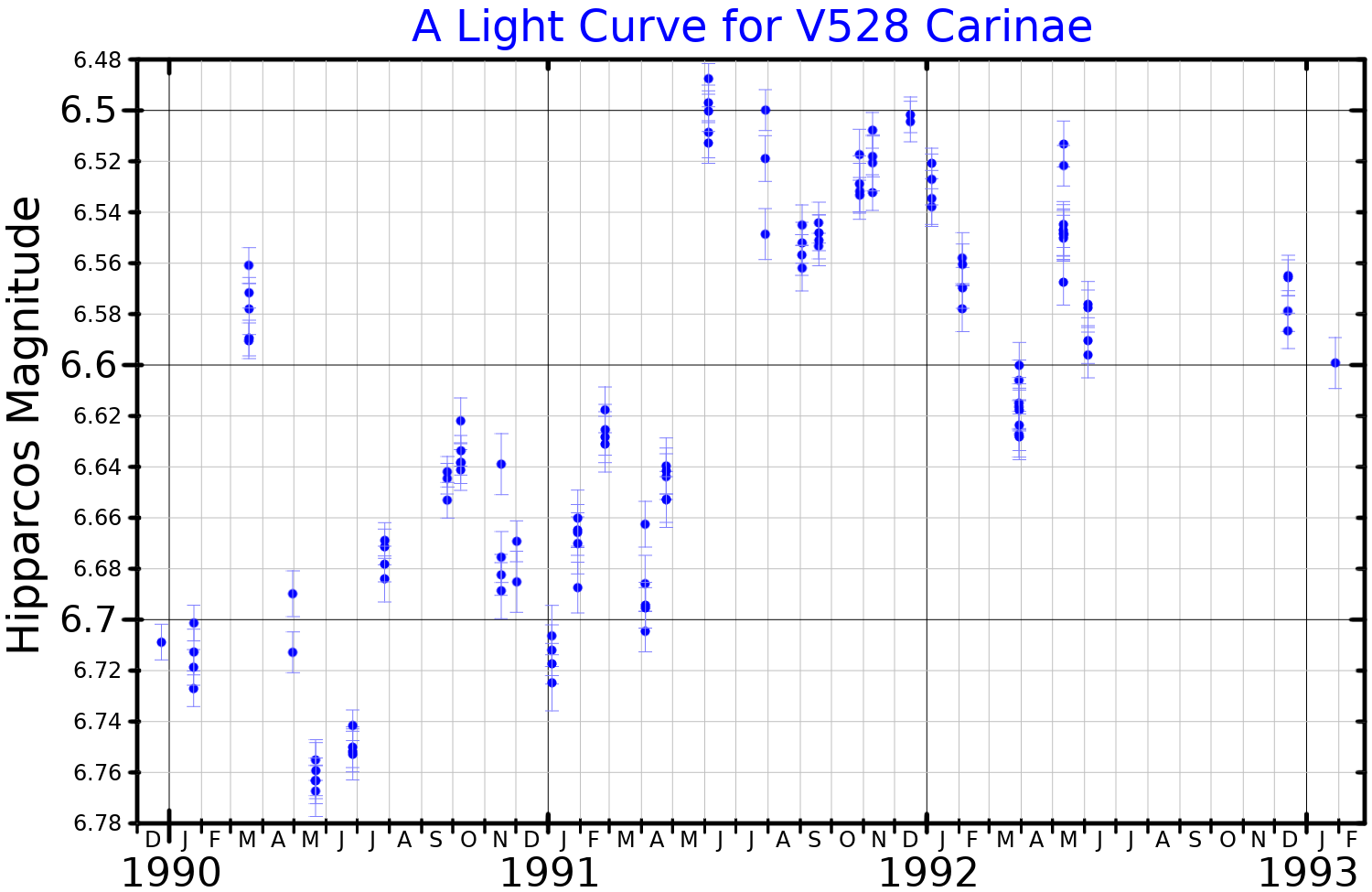
A light curve for V528 Carinae, plotted from Hipparcos data

V528 Carinae is a red supergiant of spectral type M2 Ib with an effective temperature of 3,700 K. It has a radius of 700 solar radii. In the visible spectrum, its luminosity is 11,900 times higher than the Sun, but the bolometric luminosity considering all wavelengths reaches around 81,000 L_{☉}. It loses mass at 0.5×10^{−9} M_{☉} per year.

It was found to be a variable star when the Hipparcos data was analyzed, and for that reason it was given its variable star designation in 1999. It is classified as a slow irregular variable whose prototype is TZ Cassiopeiae.

== See also ==
- List of largest known stars
