= Pi Aurigae =

Star in the constellation Auriga

- The location of π Aurigae (circled)

Observation data Epoch J2000 Equinox ICRS
- Constellation: Auriga
- Right ascension: 05^{h} 59^{m} 56.09792^{s}
- Declination: +45° 56′ 12.2457″
- Apparent magnitude (V): 4.25

Characteristics
- Evolutionary stage: asymptotic giant branch
- Spectral type: M3 IIb
- U−B color index: +1.83
- B−V color index: +1.72
- Variable type: LC

Astrometry
Radial velocity (R_{v})	0.71±0.76 km/s
Proper motion (μ)	RA: −3.755 mas/yr Dec.: −7.785 mas/yr
Parallax (π)	4.515±0.241 mas
Distance	720 ± 40 ly (220 ± 10 pc)
Absolute magnitude (M_{V})	−2.46

Details
Mass	2.98 M_{☉}
Radius	218.6 R_{☉}
Luminosity	6,630±1,054 L_{☉}
Surface gravity (log g)	0.55±0.10 cgs
Temperature	3,525±125 K
Metallicity [Fe/H]	0.03±0.04 dex

Other designations
- π Aur, 35 Aurigae, BD+45 1217, HD 40239, HIP 28404, HR 2091, SAO 40756

Database references
SIMBAD	data

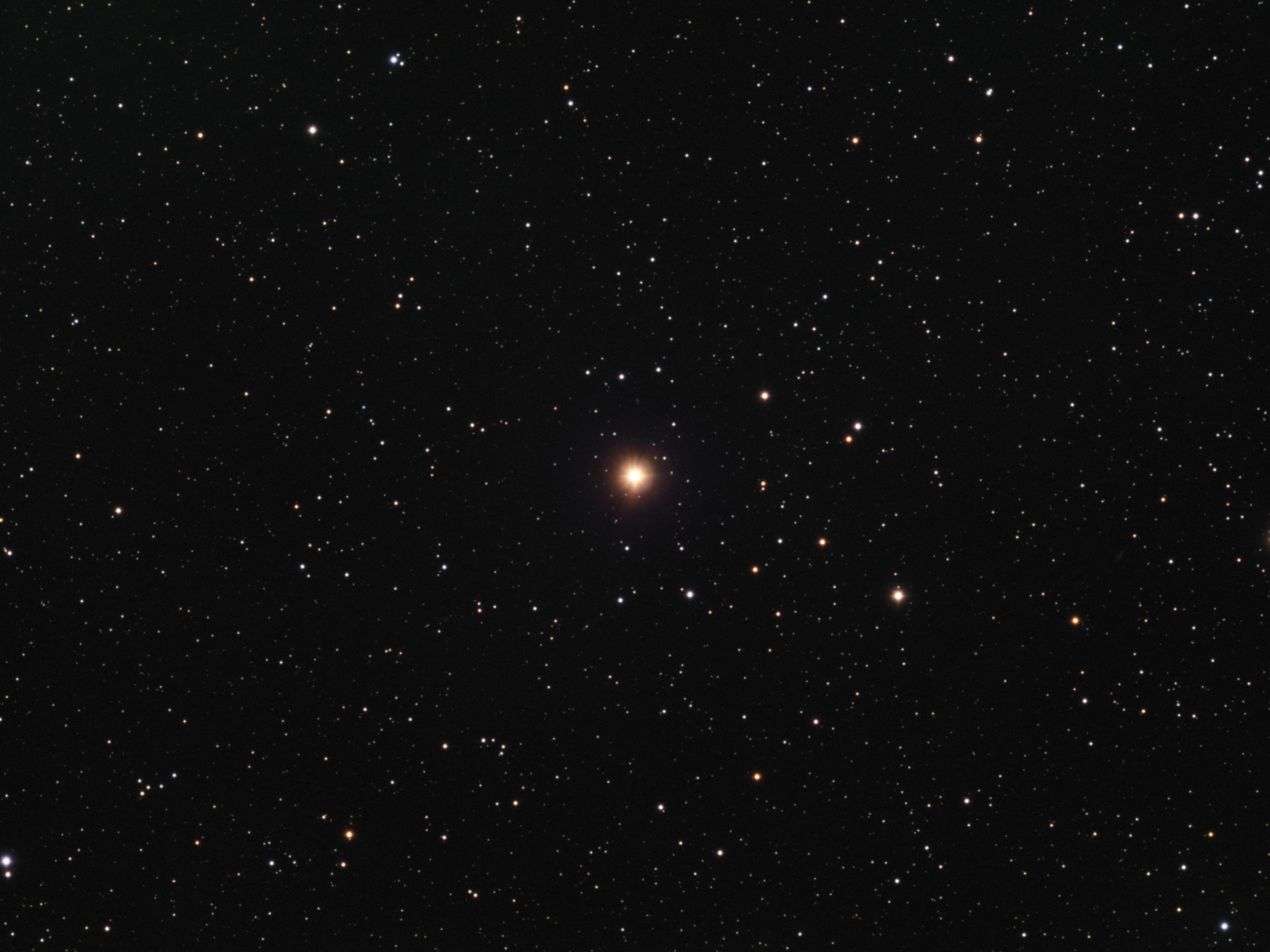
π Aurigae (center) in optical light

Pi Aurigae is a single, red-hued star in the northern constellation of Auriga. Its name is a Bayer designation that is Latinized from π Aurigae, and abbreviated Pi Aur or π Aur. Located about one degree north of the 2nd magnitude star Beta Aurigae, Pi Aurigae is visible to the naked eye with an apparent visual magnitude of 4.25 Based upon parallax measurements, it is approximately 720 light-years (220 parsecs) away from Earth. At that distance, the brightness of the star is diminished by 0.54 in magnitude from extinction caused by interstellar gas and dust.

Pi Aurigae is an evolved bright giant star with a stellar classification of M3 IIb. After exhausting the supply of hydrogen at its core the star has expanded to approximately 219 times the size of the Sun. It is classified as a slow irregular variable of type LC and its brightness varies from magnitude +4.24 to +4.34. On average, the star is radiating 6,630 times the Sun's luminosity from its enlarged photosphere at an effective temperature of 3,525 K.
