= NS Puppis =

Star in the constellation Puppis

- Location of NS Puppis (circled)

Observation data Epoch J2000 Equinox J2000
- Constellation: Puppis
- Right ascension: 08^{h} 11^{m} 21.4934^{s}
- Declination: −39° 37′ 06.7588″
- Apparent magnitude (V): 4.40–4.50

Characteristics
- Evolutionary stage: Supergiant
- Spectral type: K4.5 Ib
- Variable type: Lc

Astrometry
| Radial velocity (R_{v}) | 16.20 km/s |
| Proper motion (μ) | RA: −9.072 mas/yr Dec.: 3.211 mas/yr |
| Parallax (π) | 2.3831±0.1188 mas |
| Distance | 1,363+62 −65 ly (418+19 −20 pc) |

Details
| Mass | 8±0.9 M_{☉} |
| Radius | 213±24 R_{☉} |
| Luminosity | 9,772 L_{☉} |
| Surface gravity (log g) | 0.73±0.02 cgs |
| Temperature | 3,961±125 K |

Other designations
- h^{1} Pup, CD−39°4084, HD 68553, HIP 40091, HR 3225, SAO 198908

Database references
| SIMBAD | data |

NS Puppis (NS Pup) is an irregular variable star in the constellation Puppis. Its apparent magnitude varies between 4.4 and 4.5.

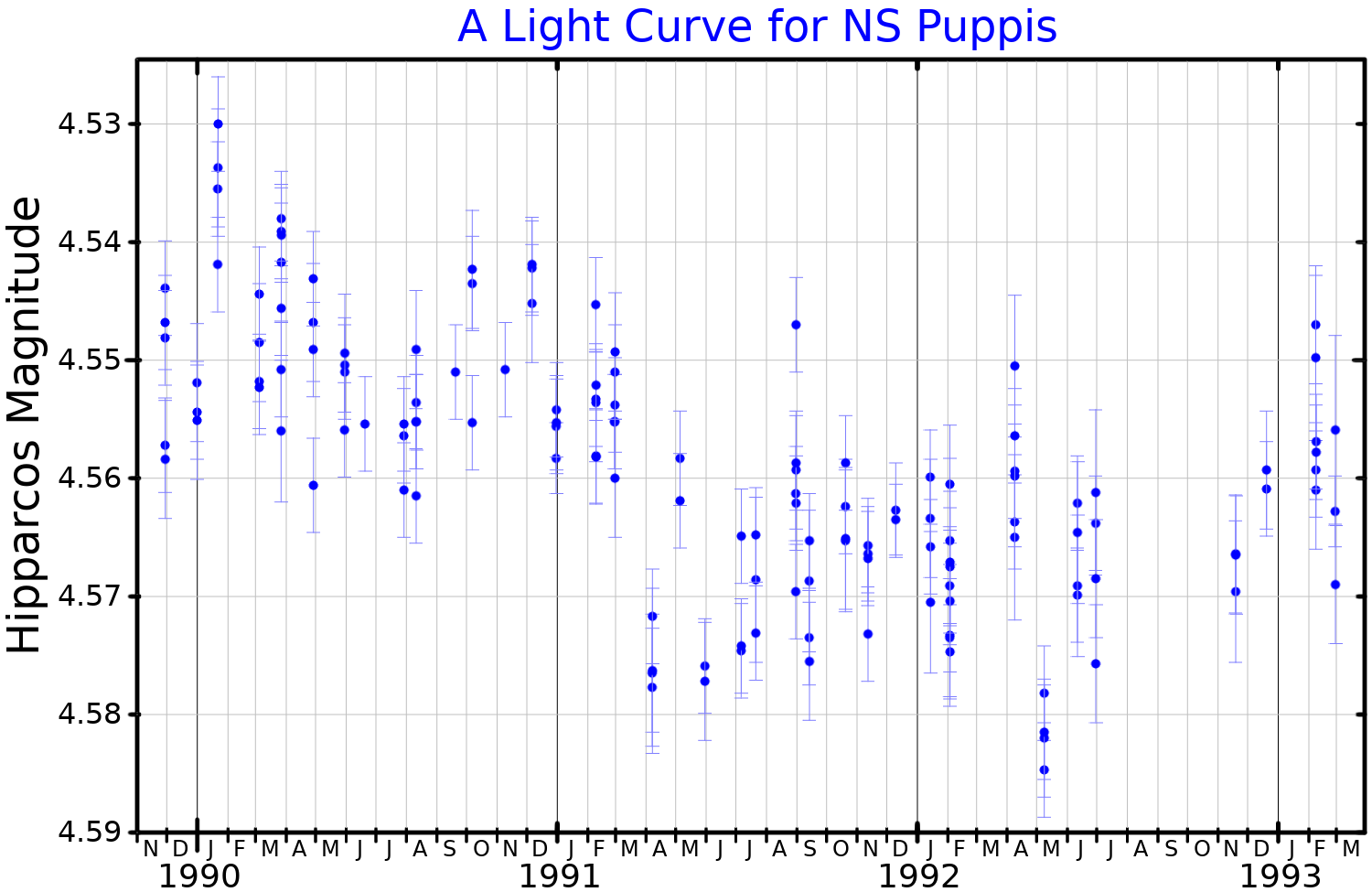
A light curve for NS Puppis, plotted from Hipparcos data

NS Puppis is a naked eye star, given the h^{1} and the Bright Star Catalogue number 3225. It was considered to be a stable star until 1966. It was given the variable star designation NS Puppis in 1975.

h^{2} Puppis is another luminous K-type star with almost the same visual magnitude about a degree to the southeast.
