= 13 Boötis =

Star in the constellation Boötes

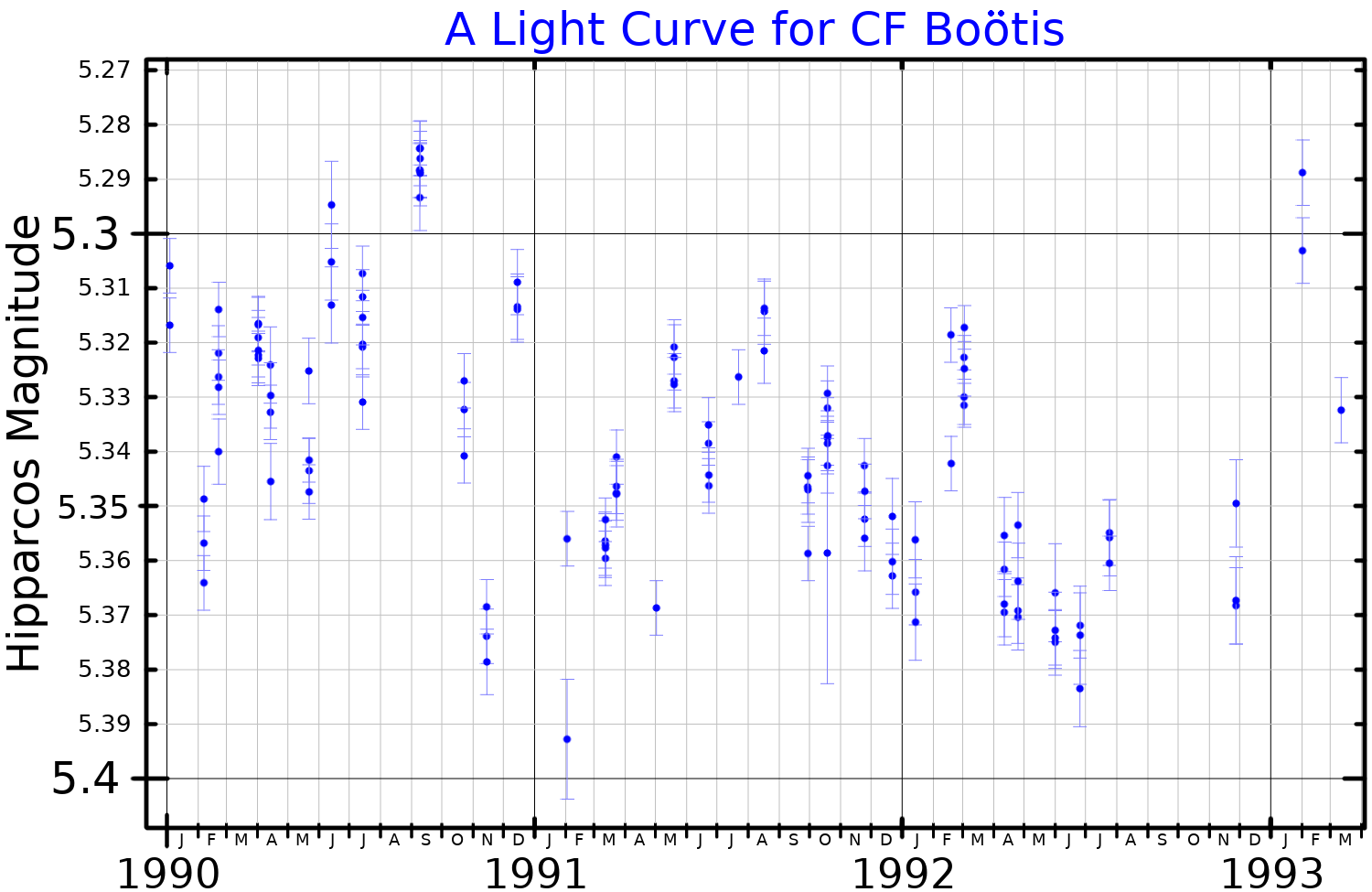
- A light curve for CF Boötis, plotted from Hipparcos data

Observation data Epoch J2000 Equinox ICRS
- Constellation: Boötes
- Right ascension: 14^{h} 08^{m} 17.30243^{s}
- Declination: +49° 27′ 29.3993″
- Apparent magnitude (V): 5.29 to 5.38

Characteristics
- Evolutionary stage: AGB
- Spectral type: M1.5III
- U−B color index: +1.92
- B−V color index: +1.637±0.010
- Variable type: Lb

Astrometry
Radial velocity (R_{v})	−13.92±0.06 km/s
Proper motion (μ)	RA: −58.584 mas/yr Dec.: 59.801 mas/yr
Parallax (π)	4.6635±0.1756 mas
Distance	700 ± 30 ly (214 ± 8 pc)
Absolute magnitude (M_{V})	−0.87

Details
Mass	0.8-2.6 M_{☉}
Radius	74+10 −12 R_{☉}
Luminosity	1,114±48 L_{☉}
Temperature	3,889+379 −248 K

Other designations
- 13 Boo, CF Boo, BD+50°2047, FK5 3124, GC 19095, HD 123782, HIP 69068, HR 5300, SAO 44905, CCDM 14082+4927, WDS 14083+4927

Database references
SIMBAD	data

13 Boötis is a solitary variable star in the northern constellation of Boötes, and is positioned near the western constellation border with Ursa Major. In 1977 it was given the variable star designation CF Boötis, often abbreviated CF Boo, while 13 Boötis is the star's Flamsteed designation. This star has a reddish hue and is faintly visible to the naked eye with an apparent visual magnitude that fluctuates around 5.26. It is located at a distance of approximately 700 light years from the Sun based on parallax, but is drifting closer with a radial velocity of −14 km/s.

The variability of the brightness of 13 Boötis was announced by Joel Stebbins and Charles Morse Huffer in 1928, based on observations made at Washburn Observatory. This is an aging red giant star on the asymptotic giant branch with a stellar classification of M1.5III, which is interpreted by stellar evolutionary models to mean it has exhausted the supply of hydrogen at its core then cooled and expanded off the main sequence. It is classified as a slow irregular variable of the Lb type, and its brightness has been observed to vary from +5.29 down to +5.38. The star has ~74 times the girth of the Sun and is radiating 1,114 times the Sun's luminosity from its swollen photosphere at an effective temperature of 3,889 K.

There is a magnitude 11.05 visual companion located at an angular separation of 76.40 arcseconds from the brighter star, along a position angle of 270°. This was first reported by William Herschel in 1783.

== Possible planetary system ==
In 1991, Duquennoy & Mayor reported the possible presence of a low-mass object (of likely substellar nature) orbiting the red giant 13 Bootis. They set a minimum mass of 30 times that of Jupiter (likely a brown dwarf) and estimated an orbital period of 1.35 years. So far there has been no confirmation about the presence a substellar object.

The 13 Boötis planetary system
Companion (in order from star)	Mass	Semimajor axis (AU)	Orbital period (days)	Eccentricity	Inclination (°)	Radius
b (unconfirmed)	≥30 M_{J}	≥1.25	494	0.21	—	—
