= RT Carinae =

Star in the constellation Carina

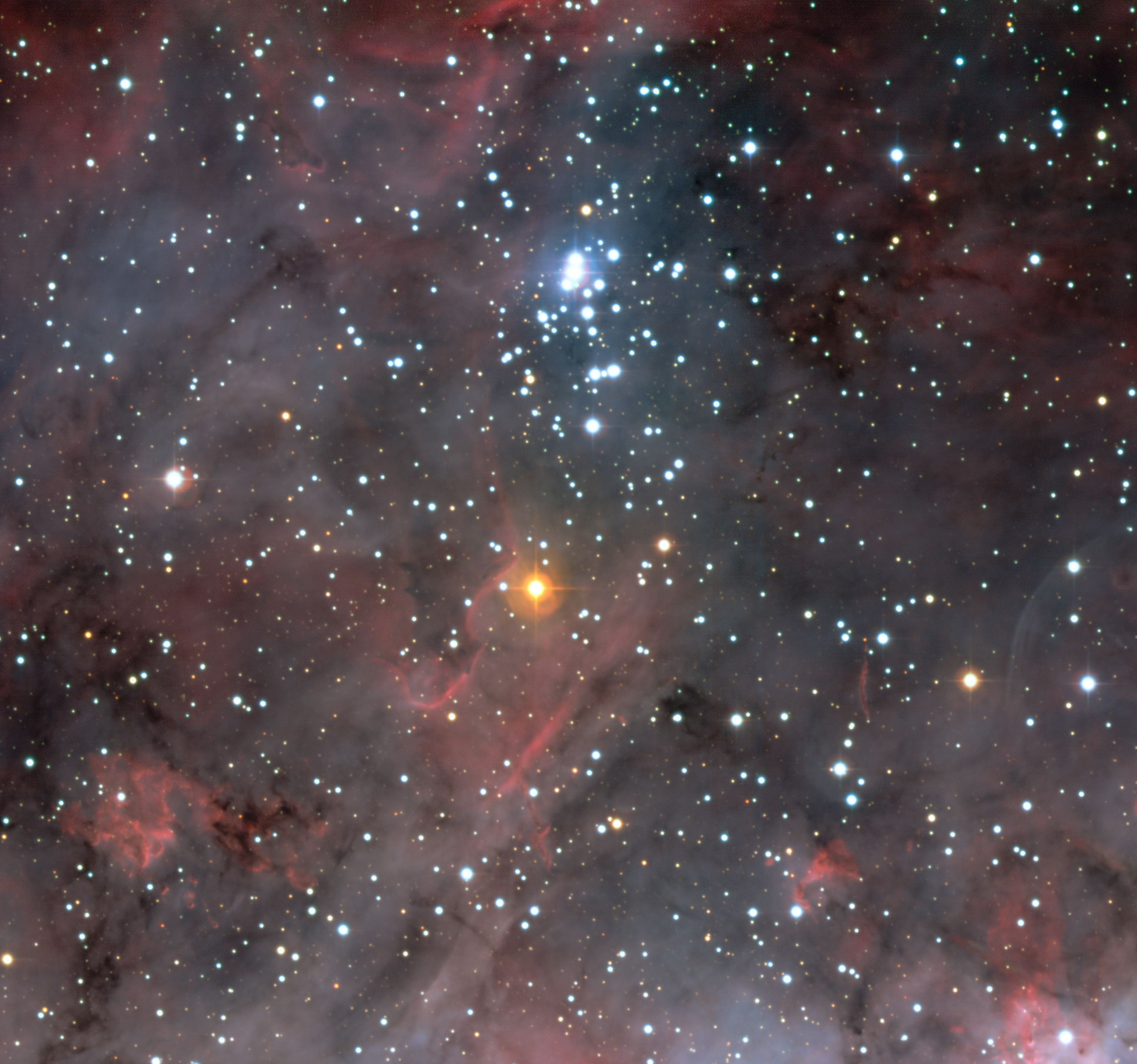
- RT Carinae is the bright orange star south of the Trumpler 15 cluster.

Observation data Epoch J2000.0 Equinox J2000.0
- Constellation: Carina
- Right ascension: 10^{h} 44^{m} 47.148^{s}
- Declination: −59° 24′ 48.12″
- Apparent magnitude (V): 8.2 - 9.9

Characteristics
- Spectral type: M2+ Iab
- B−V color index: +2.31
- Variable type: LC

Astrometry
Radial velocity (R_{v})	−21.95±0.58 km/s
Proper motion (μ)	RA: −7.432 mas/yr Dec.: +2.851 mas/yr
Parallax (π)	0.470±0.069 mas
Distance	approx. 7,000 ly (approx. 2,100 pc)
Absolute magnitude (M_{V})	−6.74

Details
Radius	1,090±218 R_{☉}
Luminosity (bolometric)	129,000+33,000 −24,000 L_{☉}
Surface gravity (log g)	−0.3 cgs
Temperature	3,625±100 K

Other designations
- RT Car, AAVSO 1040-58, CD−58°3538, HD 303310, HIP 52562, SAO 238424

Database references
SIMBAD	data

RT Carinae (abbreviated to RT Car), also known as CD−58 3538, is a red supergiant or hypergiant variable star, located 7,000 light years away in the constellation Carina and in the Carina Nebula. The apparent magnitude varying around +9 is too faint to be visible to the naked eye.

== Observational history ==
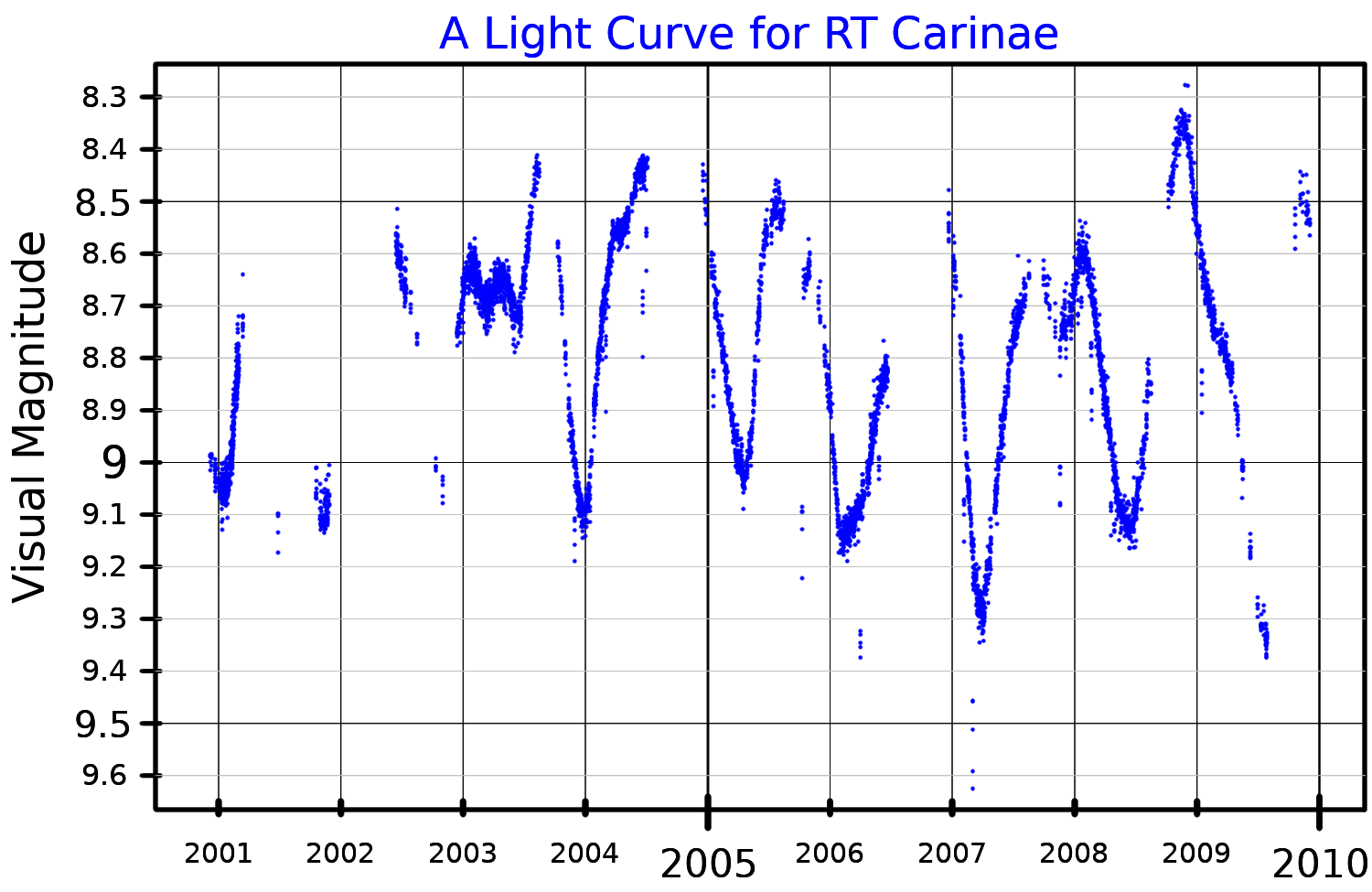
A visual band light curve for RT Carinae, plotted from ASAS data

In 1898 it was announced that Louisa D. Wells had discovered that the star's brightness varies. The initial variable star designation given was R Carinae, but that name was eventually given to a different star. It appears with its current name, RT Carinae, in Annie Jump Cannon's 1907 work, Second Catalogue of Variable Stars. It is catalogued as an irregular variable star, but a number of possible pulsation periods have been detected. Analysis from observations over 40 years give variations with periods of 201 and 448 days, with other studies suggesting periods of 100 and 1,400 days.

== Characteristics ==
RT Carinae is a red supergiant with a spectral type given in the General Catalogue of Variable Stars as M2Ia-0, suggesting the star is a hypergiant or an extremely luminous supergiant. It has been defined as a standard star for the MK spectral classification of M2+ Iab, which suggests the star to be an intermediate-luminosity supergiant.

The star has a temperature of 3,625 K and a radius about 1,090 times that of the Sun, with an estimated luminosity 130,000 times that of the Sun. It is close to the open cluster Trumpler 15, but is not thought to be a member. It appears to be surrounded by a dusty nebula, possibly material ejected from the star itself.
