= CQ Camelopardalis =

Star in the constellation Camelopardalis

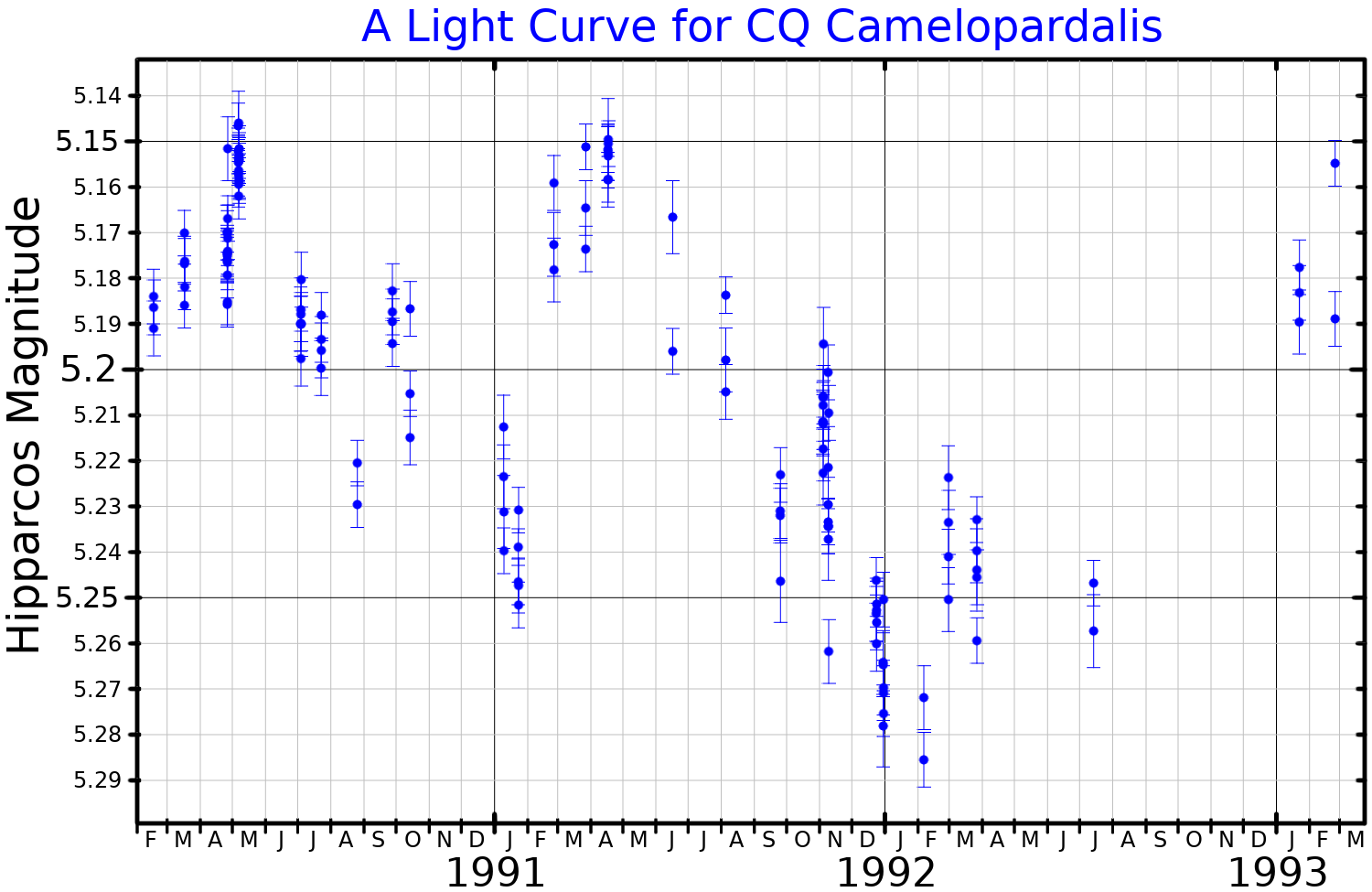
- A light curve for CQ Camelopardalis, plotted from Hipparcos data

Observation data Epoch J2000.0 Equinox ICRS
- Constellation: Camelopardalis
- Right ascension: 03^{h} 24^{m} 40.5567^{s}
- Declination: +64° 35′ 09.580″
- Apparent magnitude (V): 5.19

Characteristics
- Evolutionary stage: AGB
- Spectral type: M0 II
- B−V color index: +2.05
- R−I color index: +1.23
- Variable type: Lc?

Astrometry
Radial velocity (R_{v})	−22.2±0.5 km/s
Proper motion (μ)	RA: −3.734 mas/yr Dec.: −0.171 mas/yr
Parallax (π)	1.6385±0.1030 mas
Distance	2,000 ± 100 ly (610 ± 40 pc)

Details
Mass	12.7±0.5 M_{☉}
Radius	333 R_{☉}
Luminosity	13,236 L_{☉}
Surface gravity (log g)	0.48±0.08 cgs
Temperature	3,790±122 K
Metallicity [Fe/H]	+0.17±0.04 dex
Age	15.8±0.3 Myr

Other designations
- CQ Cam, NSV 1121, AG+64°221, BD+64°391, FK5 1096, GC 4034, HD 20797, HIP 15890, HR 1009, SAO 12743

Database references
SIMBAD	data

CQ Camelopardalis, abbreviated as CQ Cam, is a solitary variable star in the northern circumpolar constellation Camelopardalis. It has an apparent magnitude of 5.19, making it visible to the naked eye under ideal conditions. The object is relatively far at a distance of about 2,000 light years but is drifting closer with a heliocentric radial velocity of −22 km/s. It has a peculiar velocity of 21.8+2.1
−1.9 km/s, making it a runaway star.

CQ Cam has a stellar classification of M0 II, indicating that it is a red bright giant. CQ Cam is currently on the asymptotic giant branch, fusing hydrogen and helium shells around an inert carbon core. At present it has 12.7 times the mass of the Sun but, at the age of 16 million years, it has expanded to 333 times the radius of the Sun. The object is a luminous star, with a bolometric luminosity over 10,000 times that of the Sun. Despite this brightness, CQ Cam's large diameter yields an effective temperature of 3,790 K from its photosphere, giving a red hue.

CQ Cam has been classified as a low amplitude slow irregular variable based on Hipparcos photometry. However, there have not been enough observations to confirm this.
