= U Antliae =

Carbon star in the constellation Antlia

- Location of U Antliae (circled)

Observation data Epoch J2000 Equinox J2000
- Constellation: Antlia
- Right ascension: 10^{h} 35^{m} 12.851^{s}
- Declination: −39° 33′ 45.32″
- Apparent magnitude (V): 5.27 - 6.04

Characteristics
- Evolutionary stage: AGB
- Spectral type: C-N3 (C5,3)
- U−B color index: 7.10
- B−V color index: 2.84
- Variable type: LB

Astrometry
| Radial velocity (R_{v}) | 41.00 km/s |
| Proper motion (μ) | RA: −31.504 mas/yr Dec.: +2.619 mas/yr |
| Parallax (π) | 3.6154±0.0943 mas |
| Distance | 900 ± 20 ly (277 ± 7 pc) |
| Absolute magnitude (M_{V}) | −1.87 |

Details
| Mass | 3.1 M_{☉} |
| Radius | 169 R_{☉} |
| Luminosity | 4,500 L_{☉} |
| Surface gravity (log g) | 1.96 cgs |
| Temperature | 3,394 K |
| Metallicity [Fe/H] | −0.52 dex |

Other designations
- HR 4153, HD 91793, HIP 51821, CD−38°6579, 2MASS J10351285-3933453, PPM 287864, AAVSO 1030–39, SAO 201533

Database references
| SIMBAD | data |

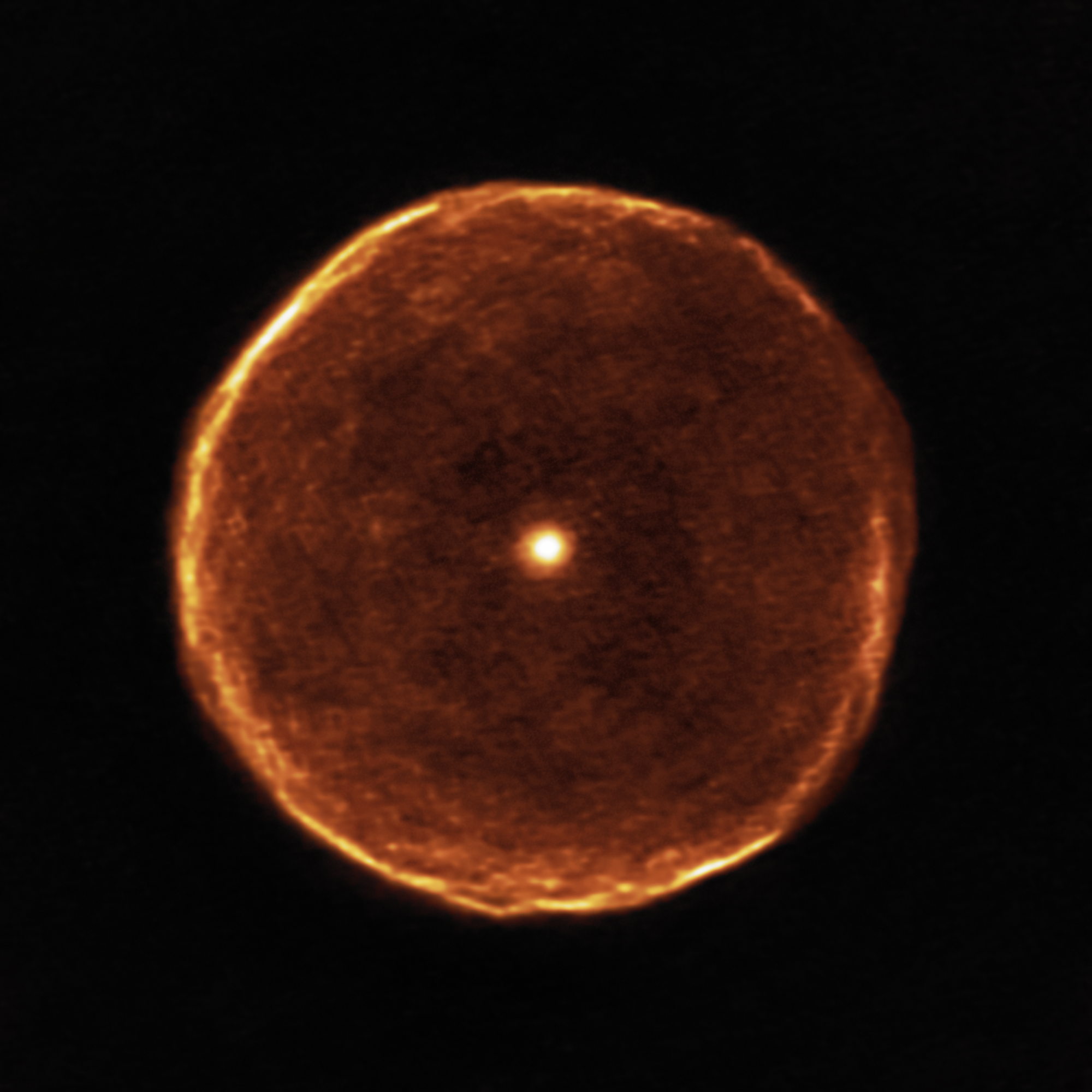
ALMA image of the dust shells around U Antliae

U Antliae (U Ant) is a variable star in the constellation Antlia. It is a carbon star surrounded by two thin shells of dust.

U Antliae is an extremely red C-type carbon star. These cool stars on the asymptotic giant branch are further reddened by strong mass loss and dust that forms around the star. U Antliae is calculated to have an effective surface temperature of 2,800 K, although the light that reaches us has an appearance more like that from a black body with a temperature of 2,300 K surrounded by dust at a temperature of 72 K. It emits most of its radiation in the infrared and although it is only about 500 times brighter than the sun at visual wavelengths, its bolometric luminosity is 8,000 times higher than the Sun's.

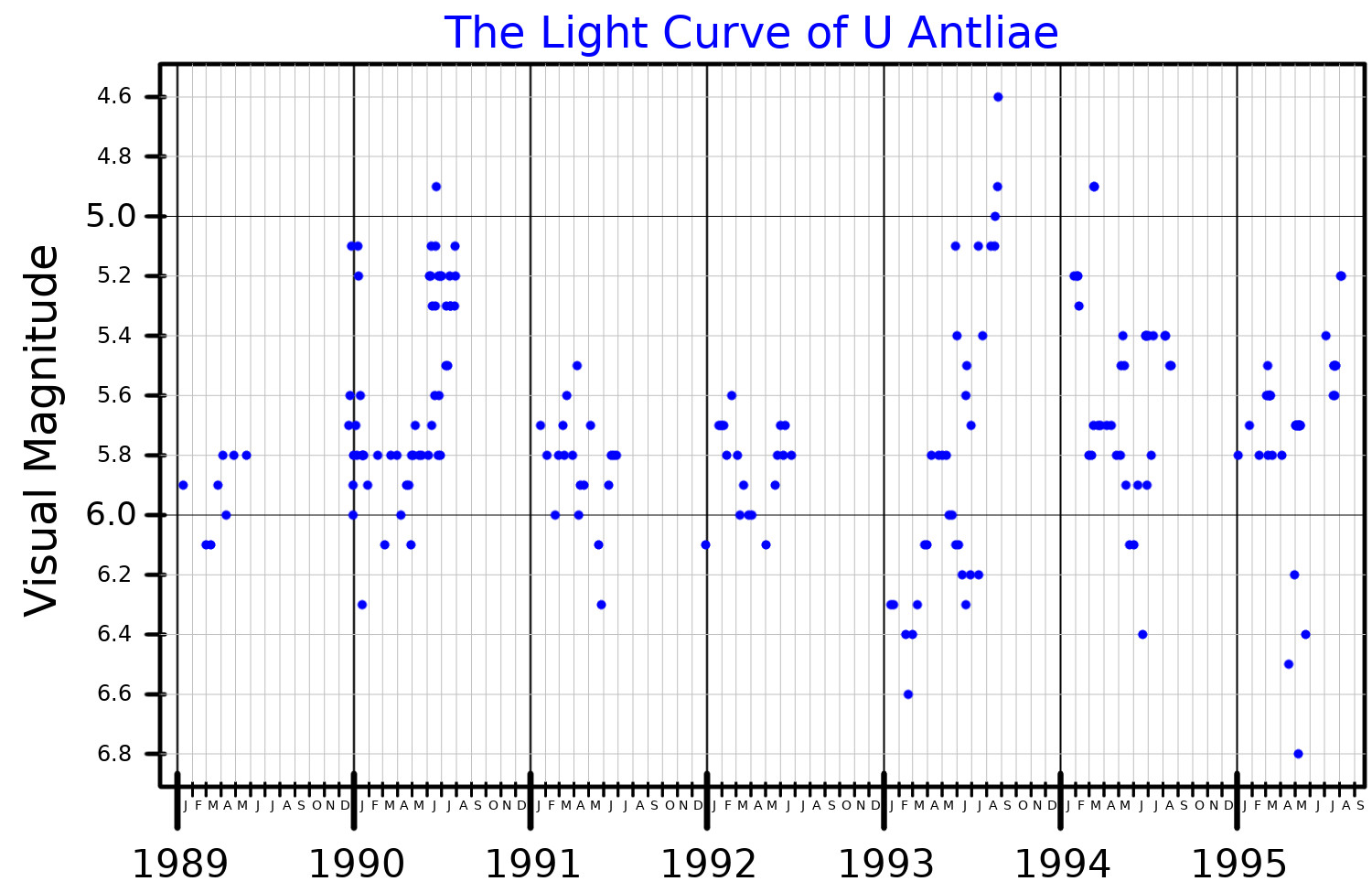
The visual band light curve of T Antliae, from AAVSO data

In 1901, Louisa Dennison Wells discovered that the brightness of the star varied, from the examination of photographic plates. Annie Jump Cannon included the star, with its variable star designation U Antiliae, in her 1907 Second Catalogue of Variable Stars. U Antliae is an irregular variable star with an apparent magnitude that varies between 5.27 and 6.04. Approximately 900 light years from Earth, it is surrounded by two shells of dust, thought to have been ejected 14,000 and 10,000 years ago. The exact origin and structure of the shells is uncertain, possibly due to enhanced mass loss during thermal pulses, possibly due to interaction of the stellar wind with interstellar material.
