= NO Aurigae =

Star in the constellation Auriga

- Location of NO Aurigae (circled)

Observation data Epoch J2000 Equinox ICRS
- Constellation: Auriga
- Right ascension: 05^{h} 40^{m} 42.050^{s}
- Declination: +31° 55′ 14.20″
- Apparent magnitude (V): 6.21 (6.06–6.44)

Characteristics
- Evolutionary stage: Asymptotic giant branch
- Spectral type: M2S Iab
- Apparent magnitude (G): 5.08
- U−B color index: +2.22
- B−V color index: +2.09
- R−I color index: +1.41
- Variable type: LC

Astrometry
Radial velocity (R_{v})	7.21±0.45 km/s
Proper motion (μ)	RA: 0.061±0.093 mas/yr Dec.: −2.959±0.051 mas/yr
Parallax (π)	0.9189±0.0930 mas
Distance	approx. 3,500 ly (approx. 1,100 pc)
Absolute magnitude (M_{V})	−5.88

Details
Mass	4.93±1.18 M_{☉}
Radius	439 ± 61 R_{☉}
Luminosity	30,900 L_{☉}
Surface gravity (log g)	−0.037 cgs
Temperature	3,651±31 K

Other designations
- BD+31°1049, HD 37536, HIP 26718, HR 1939, SAO 58322, Gaia DR3 3447781290310332672

Database references
SIMBAD	data

NO Aurigae is a pulsating variable star in the constellation Auriga. It is an unusually luminous asymptotic giant branch star about 3,500 light-years away. It is a 6th-magnitude star faintly visible to the naked eye under very good observing conditions.

== Variability ==
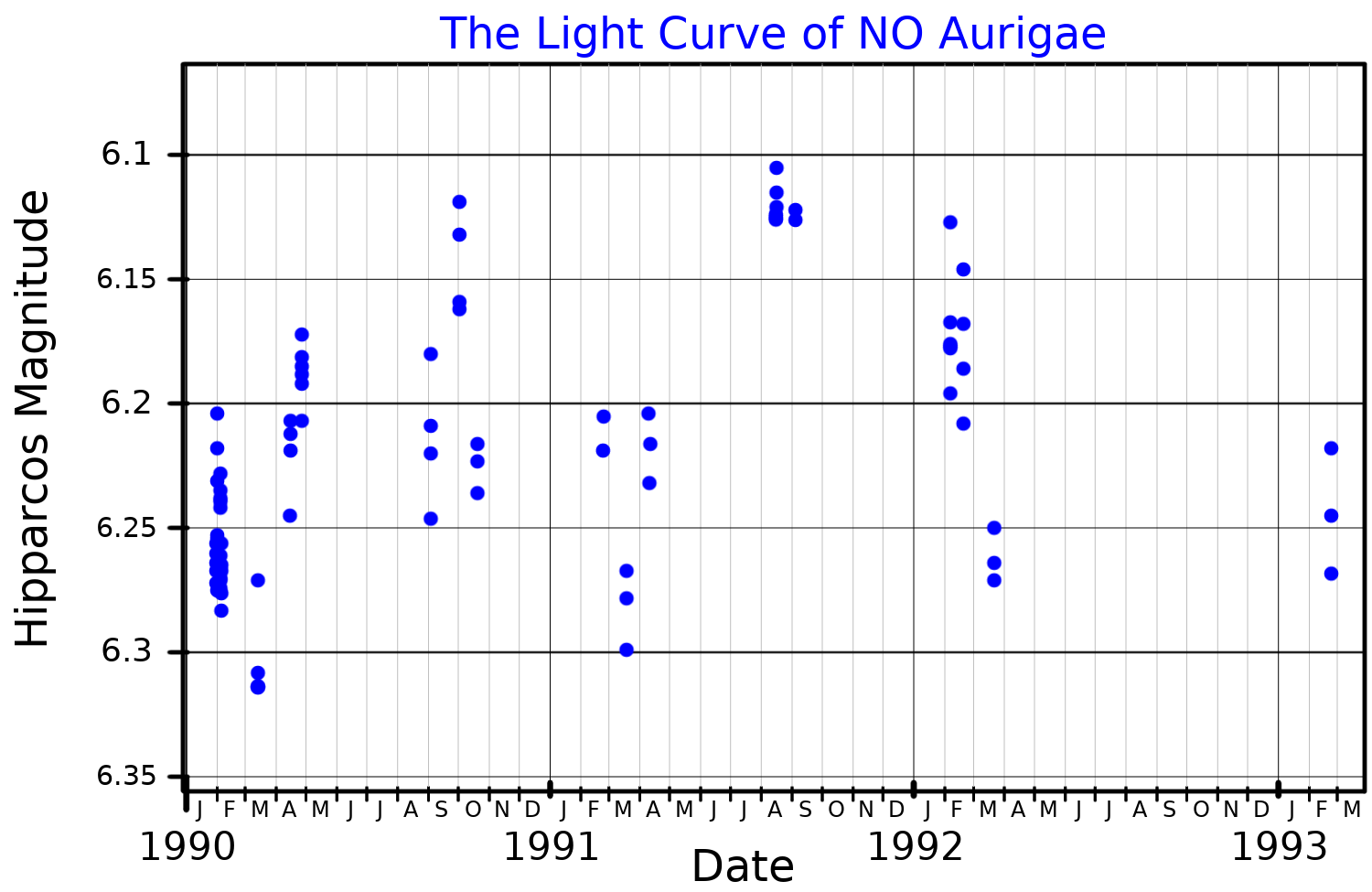
A light curve for NO Aurigae plotted from Hipparcos data

In 1969, Olin Jeuck Eggen announced that the star, then called HR 1939, is a variable star. It was given its variable star designation in 1972. NO Aurigae is listed in the General Catalogue of Variable Stars as a slow irregular variable, indicating that no regularity could be found in the brightness variations. Other studies have suggested possible periods of 102.1, 173, and 226 days, and would classify it as a semiregular variable star. The maximum visual magnitude range is 6.05–6.50.

== Properties ==
Most studies of NO Aurigae treat it as a red supergiant member of the Auriga OB1 stellar association at about 1.4 kpc. On this basis it would have a luminosity around 67,000 L_{☉} and a radius around 630 R_{☉}.

NO Aurigae is an MS star, intermediate between spectral type M and S. These are typically asymptotic giant branch stars which can appear with supergiant spectra due to their large size and low mass. Possible detection of technetium in the spectrum is a symptom of the third dredge-up which occurs only in late AGB stars.
