= TX Piscium =

Carbon star visible to the naked eye in the constellation Pisces

- Location of TX Piscium (circled)

Observation data Epoch J2000.0 Equinox ICRS
- Constellation: Pisces
- Right ascension: 23^{h} 46^{m} 23.51645^{s}
- Declination: +03° 29′ 12.5190″
- Apparent magnitude (V): 4.79 - 5.20

Characteristics
- Evolutionary stage: AGB
- Spectral type: C7,2
- U−B color index: +3.33
- B−V color index: +2.60
- Variable type: Lb

Astrometry
Radial velocity (R_{v})	+11.5±1.5 km/s
Proper motion (μ)	RA: −32.086 mas/yr Dec.: −24.545 mas/yr
Parallax (π)	4.0894±0.2124 mas
Distance	800 ± 40 ly (240 ± 10 pc)
Absolute magnitude (M_{V})	−2.22

Details
Mass	1 – 3 M_{☉}
Radius	295 R_{☉}
Luminosity	7,019 – 7,876 L_{☉}
Surface gravity (log g)	−0.2 – −0.5 cgs
Temperature	3,080 – 3,170 K
Metallicity [Fe/H]	−0.39 dex

Other designations
- 19 Psc, TX Psc, BD+02°4709, FK5 3908, HD 223075, HIP 117245, HR 9004, SAO 128374

Database references
SIMBAD	data

TX Piscium (19 Piscium) is a variable red giant star in the constellation Pisces. It is amongst the reddest naked eye stars, with a significant reddish hue when seen in binoculars. It is approximately 800 light years from Earth. It is close to—and sometimes considered part of—the asterism on the western end of the constellation called the circlet of Pisces.

== Spectrum ==
TX Piscium is a very red star, 2.6 magnitudes fainter at blue wavelengths than in the middle of the visual range, and another 3.3 magnitudes fainter in the ultraviolet.

It has been given a spectral class C7,2, indicating a relatively cool carbon star with only modest C_{2} band strength. It has alternately been classified as C-N5 C_{2}4, suggesting a warmer star with stronger C_{2} bands. Spectral features have been observed to vary.

== Variability ==
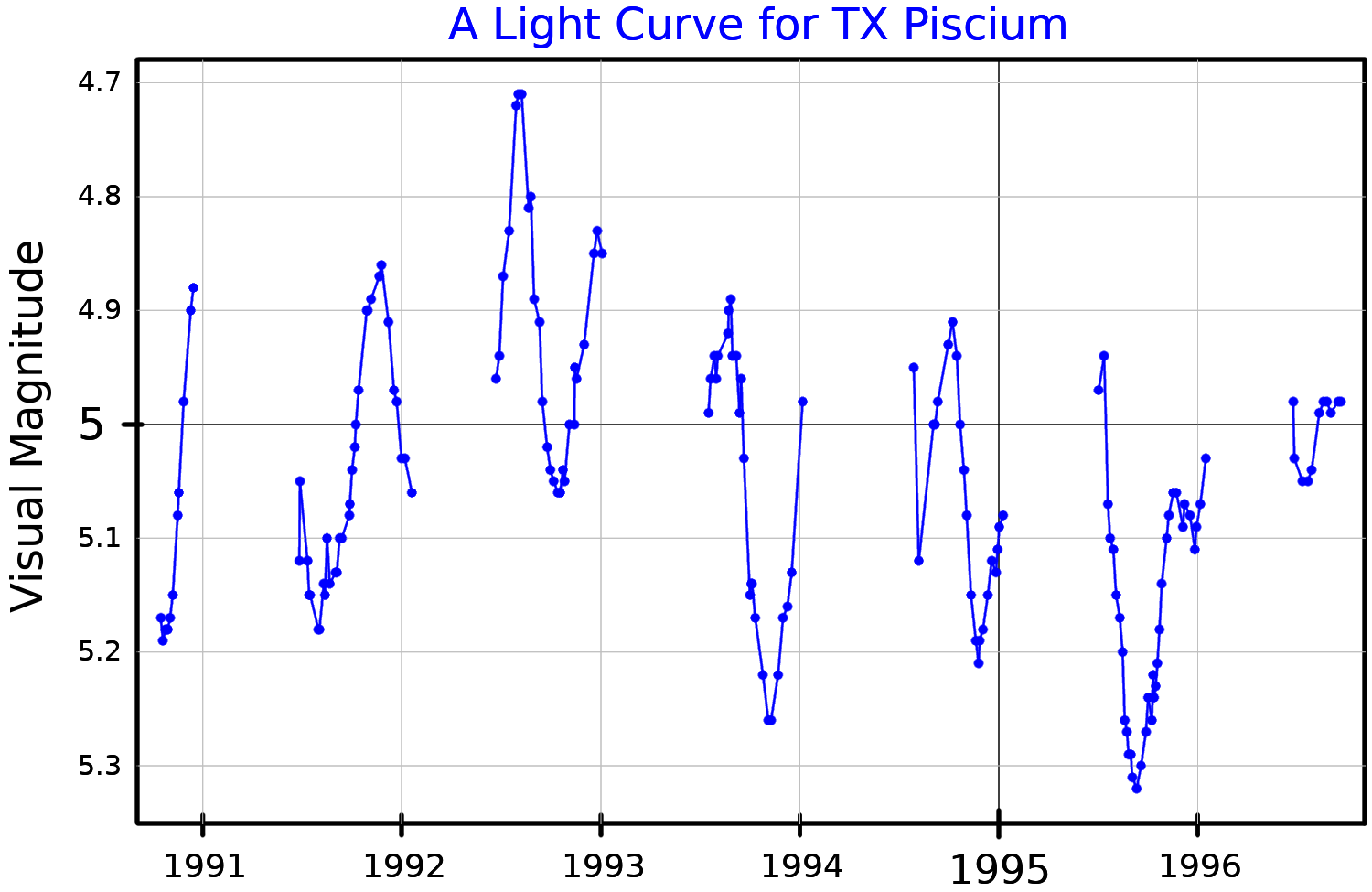
A visual band light curve for TX Piscium, plotted from data published by Wasatonic (1997)

The apparent magnitude of TX Piscium varies between +4.9 and +5.5 and it is classified as a slow irregular variable. Photometry has shown some periodicity in the brightness of 224 days, and some spectral variation over 450 days, suggesting the star is not entirely irregular.

The star apparently lies on the period–luminosity relation corresponding to fundamental mode pulsations, unusual for a low-amplitude semi-regular or irregular variable which usually pulsate in an overtone. The angular diameter has been measured at around 10 mas, although this varies depending on the observed wavelength and the atmosphere appears to be highly asymmetric. There may be one or more "blobs" of ejected material near the star. Some observations show the angular diameter to change in synchrony with the visual brightness.

== Properties ==
TX Piscium is a thermally-pulsing asymptotic giant branch (TP-AGB) red giant star, which means that it is alternately fusing helium in a shell around its core and fusing hydrogen in a shell closer to its surface. Stars on the TP-AGB are generally unstable, with high mass loss and pulsations.

The periodic flashes of the helium shell in a red giant star are known as thermal pulses and cause the hydrogen shell to be extinguished. This creates strong convection and the third dredge-up (TDU) which brings helium fusion products such as carbon to the surface. After several TDUs, the abundance of carbon in the atmosphere begins to exceed that of oxygen and then the star is known as a carbon star. In TX Piscium, the carbon/oxygen ratio is calculated to be 1.03, which is at the low end of the scale of carbon stars. It is thought to be a relatively new carbon-rich red giant star.

TX Piscium has a mass of approximately 2 M_{☉}. Modelling of its observed properties suggest a mass between 1 and 2 M_{☉}, while evolutionary models suggest a mass between 2 and 3 M_{☉}. In particular, stars with a mass below 2 M_{☉} are not expected to become carbon stars.

The temperature of TX Piscium is thought to vary between 3,080 K at minimum visual brightness and 3,170 K at visual maximum. Similarly, its luminosity varies between 7,019 and 7,876 L_{☉}. Many of its physical properties are uncertain due to uncertainty in its distance. The Hipparcos parallax corresponds to a distance of 275 parsecs, but other estimates give distances as high as 315 parsecs. These properties imply a radius of 295 R_{☉}; if TX Piscium took the place of the Sun, it would extend beyond the orbit of the Earth, but not reach Mars.
