= GZ Velorum =

Star in the constellation Vela

- Location of GZ Velorum (circled in red)

Observation data Epoch J2000 Equinox J2000
- Constellation: Vela
- Right ascension: 10^{h} 19^{m} 36.75198^{s}
- Declination: −55° 01′ 45.4852″
- Apparent magnitude (V): 4.578

Characteristics
- Spectral type: K2.5 II
- B−V color index: +1.635
- Variable type: LC

Astrometry
Radial velocity (R_{v})	+12.9±0.8 km/s
Proper motion (μ)	RA: −13.208 mas/yr Dec.: +1.232 mas/yr
Parallax (π)	2.4256±0.1938 mas
Distance	1,300 ± 100 ly (410 ± 30 pc)
Absolute magnitude (M_{V})	−4.16

Details
Mass	8.9±0.5 M_{☉}
Radius	136 R_{☉}
Luminosity	2,679 - 2,780 L_{☉}
Surface gravity (log g)	2.0 cgs
Temperature	3,986 K
Metallicity [Fe/H]	−0.4 dex
Rotational velocity (v sin i)	2.0 km/s
Age	29.6±3.8 Myr

Other designations
- GZ Vel, CD−54°3415, FK5 2830, HD 89682, HIP 50555, HR 4063, SAO 237916

Database references
SIMBAD	data

GZ Velorum is a single, orange-hued star in the southern constellation of Vela. It is a faint star but visible to the naked eye, having an apparent visual magnitude of 4.58. The star is located around 1,300 light years from Earth, as determined from its annual parallax shift of 2.4 mas. It is moving further away with a heliocentric radial velocity of +13 km/s.

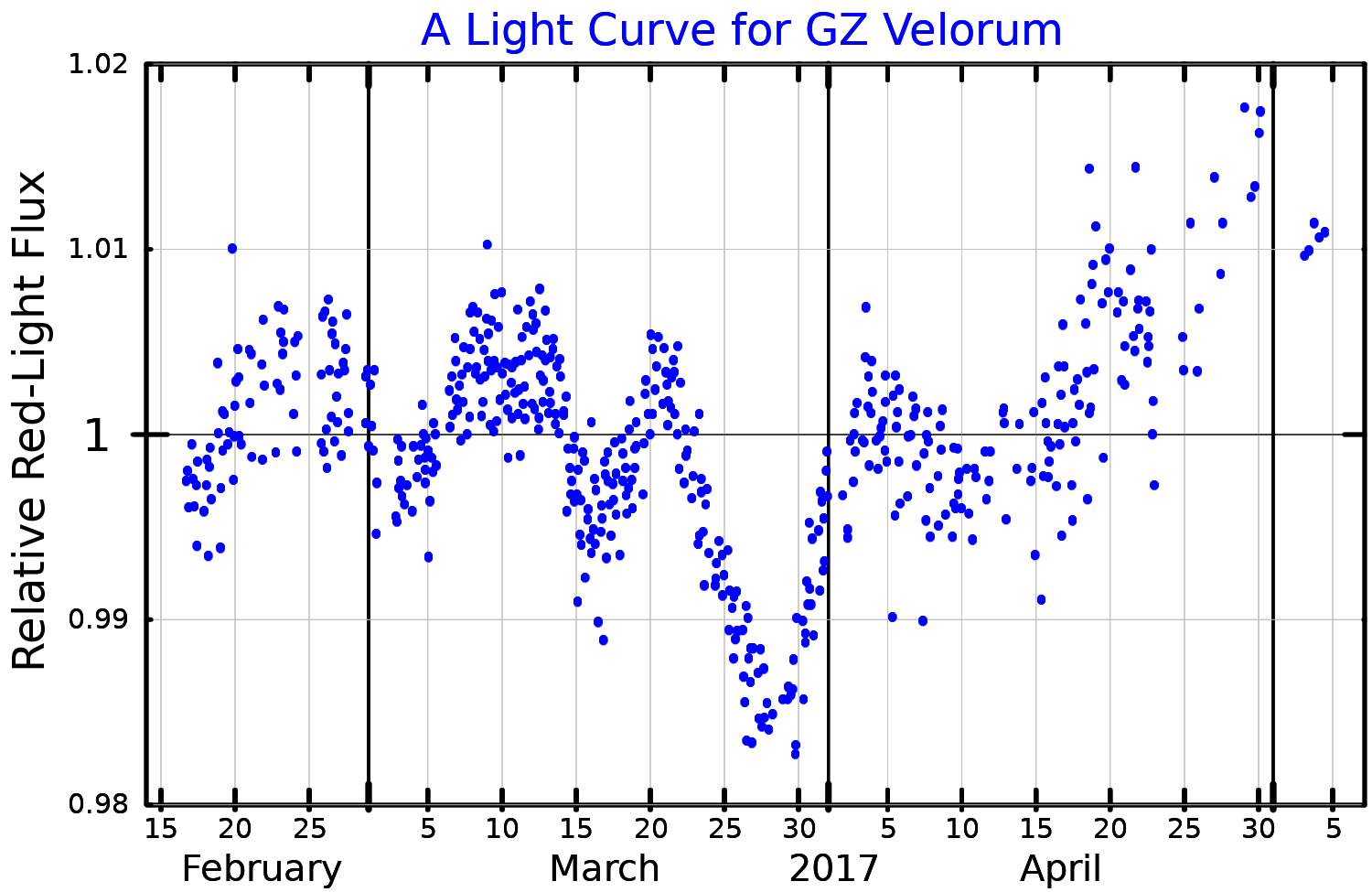
An R band light curve for GZ Velorum, adapted from Kallinger (2019)

This is a bright giant star with a stellar classification of K2.5 II. The star was found to be a variable star when the Hipparcos data was analyzed, in 1996. It is a slow irregular variable of type LC with a frequency of 0.16585 cycles per day. In the R (red) band, the magnitude of the star ranges from 3.43 down to 3.81. The measured angular diameter of this star, after correction for limb darkening, is 3.17±0.04 mas. At the estimated distance of GZ Vel, this yields a physical size of about 140 times the radius of the Sun.

GZ Vel is 30 million years old with 9 times the mass of the Sun. It is radiating 9,241 times the Sun's luminosity from its photosphere at an effective temperature of 4,140 K.
