= Trumpler 15 =

Open cluster in the constellation Carina

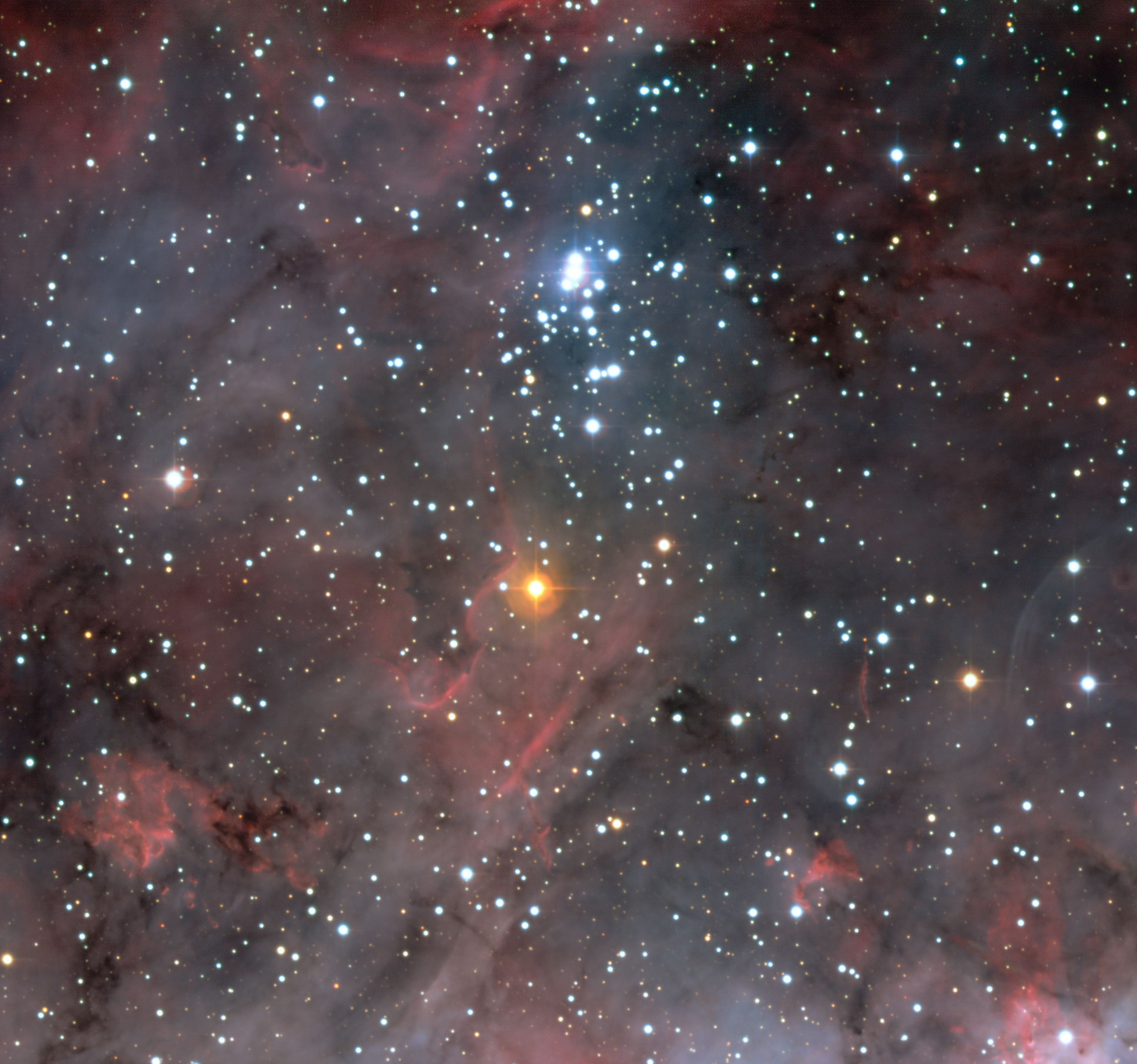

Observation data (J2000 epoch)
- Right ascension: 10^{h} 44^{m} 43^{s}
- Declination: −59° 22.0′
- Distance: 8,600 light-years (2,600 parsecs)
- Apparent magnitude (V): 7.0

Physical characteristics
- Other designations: Cr 231, C 1042-591

Associations
- Constellation: Carina

Colour-composite image of the Carina Nebula with Trumpler 15 at the top

Trumpler 15 is an open cluster in the constellation Carina that lies on the outskirts of the Carina Nebula. Estimated ages of the stars in Trumpler 15 suggest that the cluster is slightly older than its sibling clusters Trumpler 14 and 16.

It lies also above the Red Supergiant Variable star RT Carinae which is in the south of the Open cluster.
