= HD 53811 =

Star in the constellation Puppis

- Location of HD 53811 (circled)

Observation data Epoch J2000 Equinox ICRS
- Constellation: Puppis
- Right ascension: 07^{h} 03^{m} 53.60846^{s}
- Declination: −49° 35′ 02.1009″
- Apparent magnitude (V): 4.92

Characteristics
- Spectral type: A4IV
- U−B color index: +0.12
- B−V color index: +0.14

Astrometry
Radial velocity (R_{v})	+26.80 km/s
Proper motion (μ)	RA: −52.78 mas/yr Dec.: +140.27 mas/yr
Parallax (π)	16.51±0.42 mas
Distance	198 ± 5 ly (61 ± 2 pc)
Absolute magnitude (M_{V})	1.01

Details

A
Mass	2.10 M_{☉}
Radius	2.8 R_{☉}
Luminosity	33 L_{☉}
Surface gravity (log g)	3.95 cgs
Temperature	8,000 K
Rotational velocity (v sin i)	59 km/s
Age	800 Myr

B
Mass	0.64 M_{☉}
Radius	0.60 R_{☉}
Temperature	4,200 K
Age	800 Myr

Other designations
- H Puppis, CD−49°2587, GC 9348, GSC 08126-02550, HIP 34059, HR 2672, HD 53811, SAO 218427

Database references
SIMBAD	data

HD 53811 is a binary star in the constellation Puppis. Its apparent magnitude is 4.92 and it is approximately 198 light years away based on parallax. The system is estimated to be 800 million years old.

The primary component, HD 53811 A, is a class A4IV (white subgiant) star, around 2.8 times larger than the Sun and with an effective temperature of 8,000 K. The secondary component, HD 53811 B, is a much smaller star with 0.60 times the size of the Sun and a temperature of 4,200 K. HD 53811 B explains both the observed astrometric anomalies in the Hipparcos and Tycho-2 Catalogue data and the hard X-ray emission coming from this system, which would be unexpected for an A-type star. The companion was discovered in 2026 using interferometry at the GRAVITY instrument aboard the Very Large Telescope. The projected separation at the discovery date, corresponding to the angular separation between the components multiplied by their distance to Earth, is 3.9 au. If this value is close to the semi-major axis, the orbital period would be expected to be around five years.
