= TZ Cassiopeiae =

Star in the constellation Cassiopeia

Observation data Epoch J2000 Equinox ICRS
- Constellation: Cassiopeia
- Right ascension: 23^{h} 52^{m} 56.23689^{s}
- Declination: +61° 00′ 08.3915″
- Apparent magnitude (V): 9.18 (+8.86 - +10.5)

Characteristics
- Evolutionary stage: red supergiant
- Spectral type: M3 Iab
- U−B color index: +2.43
- B−V color index: +2.57
- Variable type: Lc

Astrometry
Radial velocity (R_{v})	−54.28 km/s
Proper motion (μ)	RA: −3.215±0.026 mas/yr Dec.: −2.145±0.028 mas/yr
Parallax (π)	0.3888±0.0300 mas
Distance	8,400 ± 600 ly (2,600 ± 200 pc)
Absolute magnitude (M_{V})	−5.98

Details
Mass	15 M_{☉}
Radius	646 R_{☉}
Luminosity	68,500 L_{☉}
Surface gravity (log g)	−0.01 cgs
Temperature	3,670 K
Metallicity [Fe/H]	+0.15 dex

Other designations
- BD+60°2634, HIP 117763, SAO 20192, 2MASS J23525623+6100083, AAVSO 2348+60

Database references
SIMBAD	data

TZ Cassiopeiae (TZ Cas, HIP 117763, SAO 20912) is a variable star in the constellation Cassiopeia with an apparent magnitude of around +9 to +10. It is approximately 8,400 light-years away from Earth. The star is a red supergiant star with a spectral type of M3 and a temperature around 3,600 K.

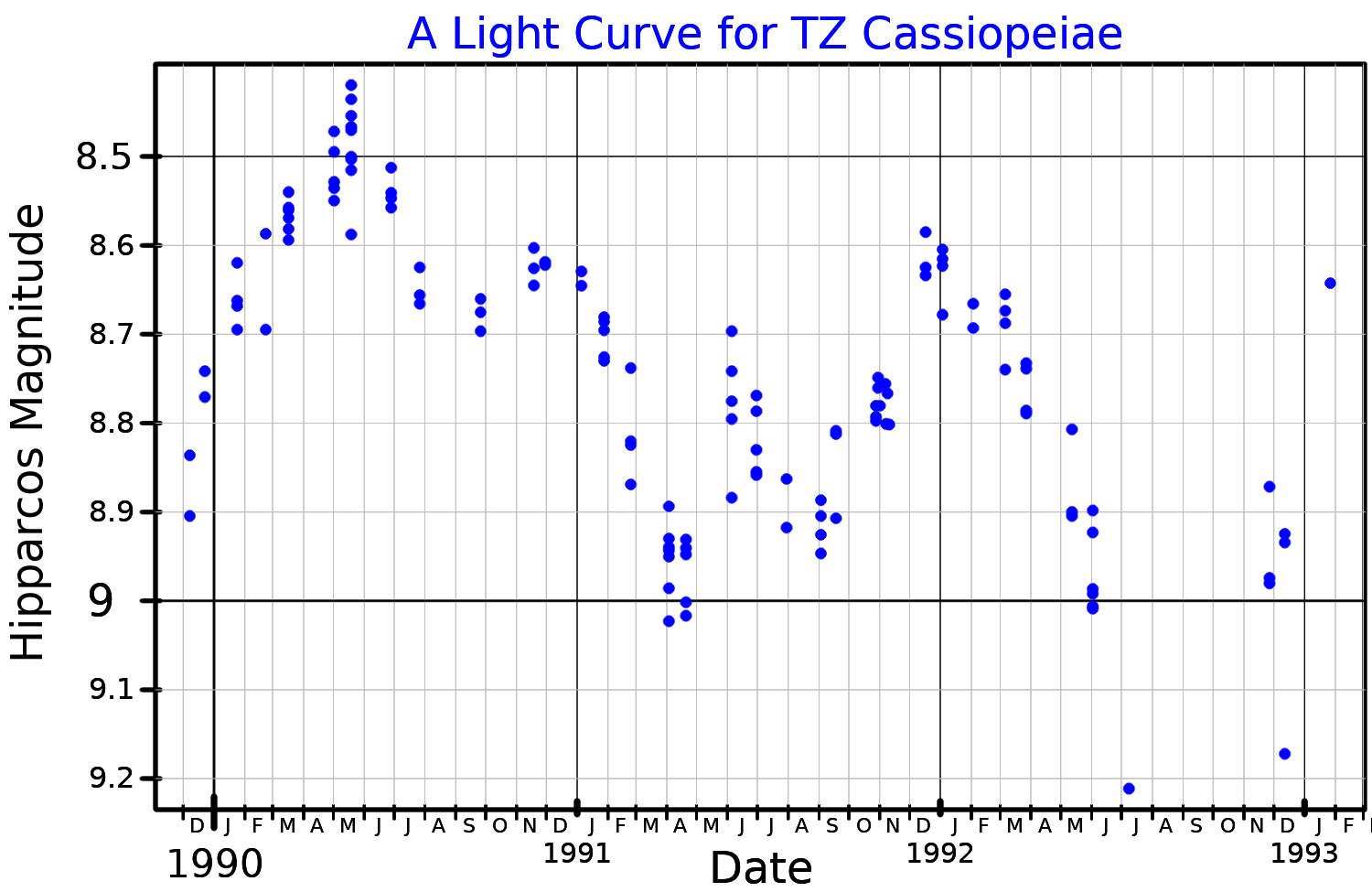
A light curve for TZ Cassiopeiae, plotted from Hipparcos data

TZ Cassiopeiae was reported as being variable by Williamina Fleming and published posthumously in 1911. It is a slow irregular variable star with a possible period of 3,100 days. It is irradiating over 68,500 times the luminosity of the Sun, and it is 640 times larger than the Sun. It is a member of the Cas OB5 stellar association, together with the nearby red supergiant PZ Cassiopeiae.

The initial mass of TZ Cassiopeiae has been estimated from its position relative to theoretical stellar evolutionary tracks to be around 15 M_{☉}.

TZ Cas is losing mass through a powerful stellar wind at two millionths of a solar mass each year. It is unclear whether this is sufficient to cause the star to lose its atmosphere and become a blue supergiant before the core exhausts its fuel and collapses as a supernova. Either as a red or blue supergiant, or a Wolf–Rayet star, it will inevitably end its life violently in a supernova explosion when the core collapse occurs.
