= HD 69142 =

Star in the constellation Puppis

- Location of HD 69142 (circled)

Observation data Epoch J2000 Equinox ICRS
- Constellation: Puppis
- Right ascension: 08^{h} 14^{m} 02.92219^{s}
- Declination: −40° 20′ 52.4031″
- Apparent magnitude (V): 4.44

Characteristics
- Spectral type: K1II-III
- U−B color index: +1.09
- B−V color index: +1.17

Astrometry
Radial velocity (R_{v})	+13.50 km/s
Proper motion (μ)	RA: +45.51 mas/yr Dec.: −65.60 mas/yr
Parallax (π)	10.93±0.48 mas
Distance	300 ± 10 ly (91 ± 4 pc)
Absolute magnitude (M_{V})	−0.38

Orbit
Primary	h^{2} Puppis Aa
Name	h^{2} Puppis Ab
Period (P)	930 days
Semi-major axis (a)	10.66 mas
Eccentricity (e)	0.4
Inclination (i)	135.2°
Longitude of the node (Ω)	181.7°
Periastron epoch (T)	2418060
Argument of periastron (ω) (secondary)	140°

Details
Mass	1.79 M_{☉}
Radius	23 R_{☉}
Luminosity	207 L_{☉}
Surface gravity (log g)	1.97 cgs
Temperature	4,467 K
Rotational velocity (v sin i)	< 1.0 km/s

Other designations
- h^{2} Puppis, CD−39°4128, CPD−39°2219, CCDM J08140-4021A, GC 11215, GSC 07664-02482, HIP 40326, HR 3243, HD 69142, SAO 219635, WDS J08140-4021A

Database references
SIMBAD	data

HD 69142 is a class K1II-III (orange bright giant) star in the constellation Puppis. Its apparent magnitude is 4.44 and it is approximately 298 light years away based on parallax.

It is a multiple star; the primary is a spectroscopic binary with a 2.55 year orbit with eccentricity 0.4, and there is a more distant companion B at 59.4" and 9.5 magnitude.
