= Slow irregular variable =

Type of variable star

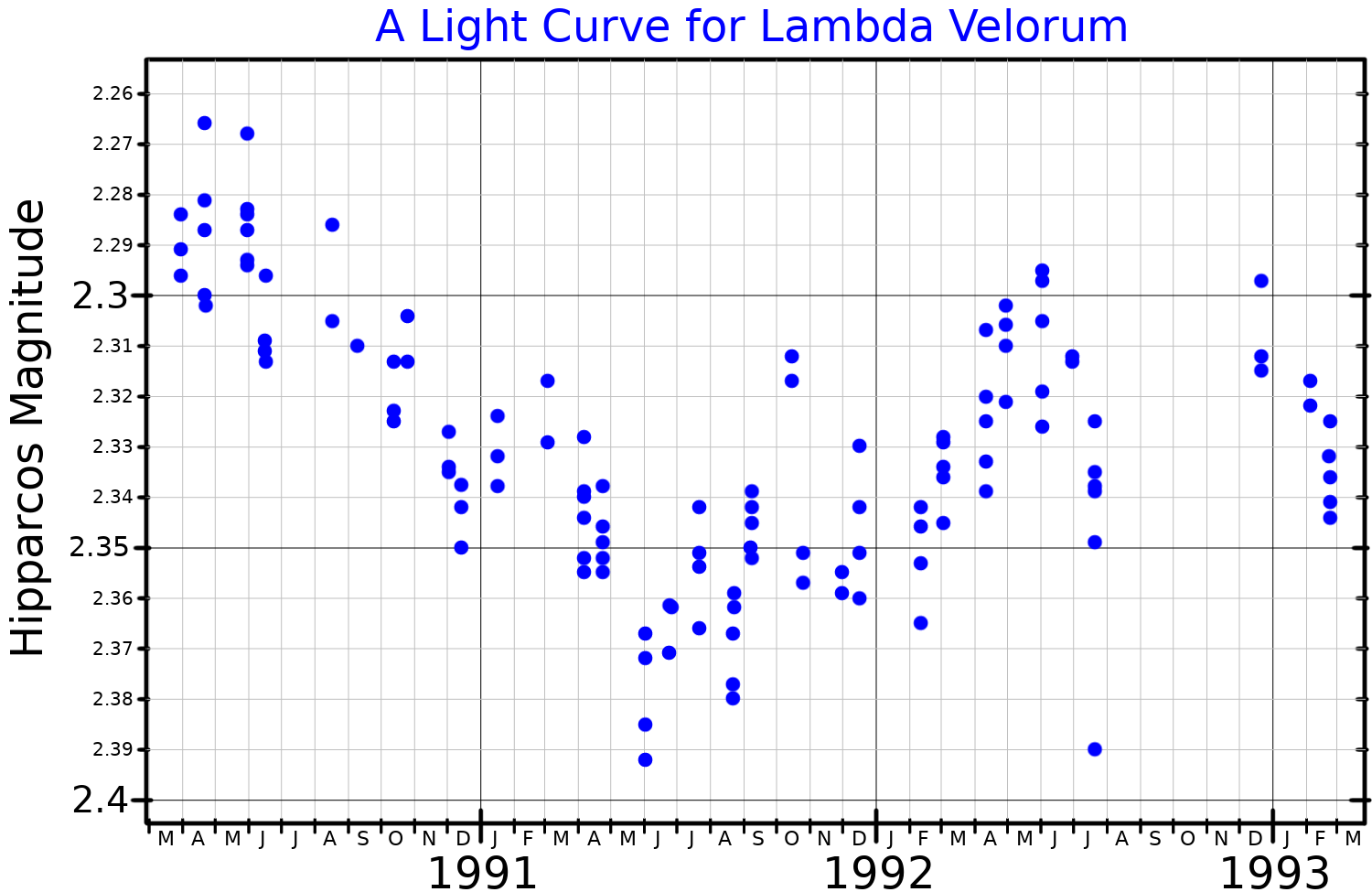
A light curve for Lambda Velorum, plotted from Hipparcos data

A slow irregular variable (ascribed the GCVS types L, LB and LC) is a variable star that exhibit no or very poorly defined periodicity in their slowly changing light emissions. These stars have often been little-studied, and once more is learnt about them, they are reclassified into other categories such as semiregular variables.

== Nomenclature ==
Irregular variable stars were first given acronyms based on the letter "I": Ia, Ib. and Ic. These were later refined so that the I codes were used "nebular" or "rapidly irregular" variable stars such as T Tauri and Orion variables. The remaining irregular stars, cool slowly varying giants and supergiants of type Ib or Ic were reassigned to Lb and Lc. When the General Catalogue of Variable Stars standardised its acronyms to be all uppercase, the codes LB and LC were used.

=== Type Lb ===
Slow irregular variables of late spectral types (K, M, C, S); as a rule, they are giants

The GCVS also claims to give this type to slow irregular red variables where the luminosity or spectral type is not known, although it also uses the type L for slow irregular red stars where the spectral type or luminosity is unclear. The K5 star CO Cygni is given as a representative example.

=== Type Lc ===
Irregular variable supergiants of late spectral types having amplitudes of about 1 mag in V

The M2 supergiant TZ Cassiopeiae is given as a representative example.

== List ==
List of Slow Irregular Variables
Designation (name)	Constellation	Discovery	Apparent magnitude (Maximum) (Note: (visual magnitude, unless marked (B) (= blue) or (p) (= photographic)))	Apparent magnitude (Minimum)	Range of magnitude	Spectral type	Subtype	Comment
U Antliae	Antlia		8^{m}.1 (p)	9^{m}.7 (p)	1.6	N:v	Lb	
Beta Pegasi (Scheat)	Pegasus	Schmidt, 1847	2^{m}.31	2^{m}.74	0.43	M2.3 II-III	Lb	
Epsilon Pegasi (Enif)	Pegasus		2^{m}.37	2^{m}.45	0.07	K2 Ib	Lc	
TX Piscium	Pisces		4^{m}.79	5^{m}.20	0.42	C5 III	Lb	
Alpha Scorpii (Antares)	Scorpius		0^{m}.88	1^{m}.16	0.28	M1.5 Iab-b	Lc	
Alpha Tauri (Aldebaran)	Taurus		0^{m}.75	0^{m}.95	0.20	K5 III	Lb	
Mu Geminorum (Tejat)	Gemini		2^{m}.75	3^{m}.02	0.28	M3 III	Lb	
BE Camelopardalis (Custos)	Camelopardalis		4^{m}.35	4^{m}.48	0.13	M2 II	Lc	
Tau^{4} Eridani	Eridanus		3^{m}.57	3^{m}.72	0.15	M3 III	Lb	
13 Boötis	Bootes		5^{m}.29	5^{m}.38	0.09	M2 IIIab	Lb	
Psi Virginis	Virgo		4^{m}.73	4^{m}.96	0.23	M3 III	Lb	
V854 Arae	Ara		5^{m}.84	5^{m}.99	0.12	M1.5 III	Lb	
62 Sagittarii	Sagittarius		4^{m}.45	4^{m}.62	0.17	M4 III	Lb	
CQ Camelopardalis	Camelopardalis		5^{m}.15	5^{m}.27	0.12	M0 II	Lc	
Pi Aurigae	Auriga		4^{m}.24	4^{m}.34	0.10	M3.5 II	Lc	
NO Aurigae	Auriga		6^{m}.06	6^{m}.44	0.58	M2 Iab	Lc	
Omicron1 Canis Majoris	Canis Major		3^{m}.78	3^{m}.99	0.21	M2.5 Iab	Lc	
Sigma Canis Majoris (Nganurganity)	Canis Major		3^{m}.43	3^{m}.51	0.08	M1.5 Iab	Lc	
NS Puppis	Puppis		4^{m}.4	4^{m}.5	0.1	K3 Ib	Lc	
Lambda Velorum (Suhail)	Vela		2^{m}.14	2^{m}.30	0.16	K4 Ib-IIa	Lc	
V337 Carinae	Carina		3^{m}.36	3^{m}.44	0.08	K3 II	Lc	
GZ Velorum	Vela		3^{m}.43	3^{m}.81	0.38	K3 II	Lc	
RX Telescopii	Telescopium		6^{m}.6	7^{m}.4	0.8	M3 Iab	Lc	
45 G. Volantis	Volans		5^{m}.89	5^{m}.90	0.01	M1III	Lb	
AF Columbae	Columba	Perryman et al., 1997	5^{m}.60	5^{m}.71	0.11	M2 II/III	Lb	

== Other irregular variables ==
There are a number of other types of variable stars lacking clearly detectable periods, and which are sometimes referred to as irregular variables:

- γ Cassiopeiae variables, eruptive shell stars
- Orion variables, pre-main-sequence stars, including T Tauri stars and YY Orionis stars
- Rapid irregular variables, possibly similar to Orion variables with shorter period
- Poorly-defined irregular variable stars, of unknown type

In addition, many types of eruptive or cataclysmic variable are highly unpredictable.
