= Irregular variable =

Type of variable star

An irregular variable is a type of variable star in which variations in brightness show no regular periodicity. There are two main sub-types of irregular variable: eruptive and pulsating.

Eruptive irregular variables are divided into three categories:

- Group I variables are split into subgroups IA (spectral types O to A) and IB (spectral types F through M).
- Orion variables, GCVS type IN (irregular and nebulous), indigenous to star-forming regions, may vary by several magnitudes with rapid changes of up to 1 magnitude in 1 to 10 days, are similarly divided by spectral type into subgroups INA and INB, but with the addition of another subgroup, INT, for T Tauri stars, or INT(YY) for YY Orionis stars.
- The third category of eruptive irregulars are the IS stars, which show rapid variations of 0.5 to 1 magnitude in a few hours or days; again, these come in subgroups ISA and ISB.

Pulsating irregular giants or supergiants, called slow irregular variables, are all of late spectral types (K, M, C, or S), and classed as type L-LB for giants and LC for supergiants. How many of these are actually semi-regular variables that simply need more study, remains unclear.
