= VX Sagittarii =

Star in the constellation Sagittarius

- VX Sagittarii as viewed by the Pan-STARRS survey.

Observation data Epoch J2000.0 Equinox J2000.0 (ICRS)
- Constellation: Sagittarius
- Right ascension: 18^{h} 08^{m} 04.04831^{s}
- Declination: −22° 13′ 26.6327″
- Apparent magnitude (V): 6.5 - 14.0

Characteristics
- Evolutionary stage: Red supergiant or hypergiant
- Spectral type: M4eIa - M10eIa
- Variable type: SRc

Astrometry
Radial velocity (R_{v})	+6.47±3.37 km/s
Proper motion (μ)	RA: +0.36±0.76 mas/yr Dec.: −2.92±0.78 mas/yr
Parallax (π)	0.64±0.04 mas
Distance	5,100 ± 300 ly (1,560 ± 100 pc)

Details
Mass	20 to 40 M_{☉}
Radius	1,456±108 – 1,556±110 R_{☉}
Luminosity	195,000±62,000, 275,000+114,000 −52,000 L_{☉}
Temperature	3,370±100, 2,900 – 3,700 K

Other designations
- VX Sgr, AAVSO 1802-22, BD−22°4575, CD−22°12589, HD 165674, HIP 88838, 2MASS J18080404-2213266

Database references
SIMBAD	data

VX Sagittarii (abbreviated to VX Sgr) is an extreme red supergiant or hypergiant pulsating variable star with an unusually large magnitude range located in the constellation of Sagittarius and more than one kiloparsec away from the Sun. It is one of the largest stars discovered and also one of the most luminous and massive cool supergiant stars in the Milky Way, with an average radius of 1,450 solar radii (1.01×10^{9} km; 6.7 au) during its quiescent pulsation phase, and of 1,556 solar radii (1.083×10^{9} km; 7.24 au) during its active pulsation phase. At those radii, an object travelling at the speed of light would take over 6 hours to go around its surface, compared to 14.5 seconds for the Sun. If this star replaced the Sun, its photosphere would extend beyond the orbit of Jupiter and near Saturn.

Although considered unlikely, VX Sgr has been suggested to be a possible candidate for a Thorne–Żytkow object.

== Observations ==
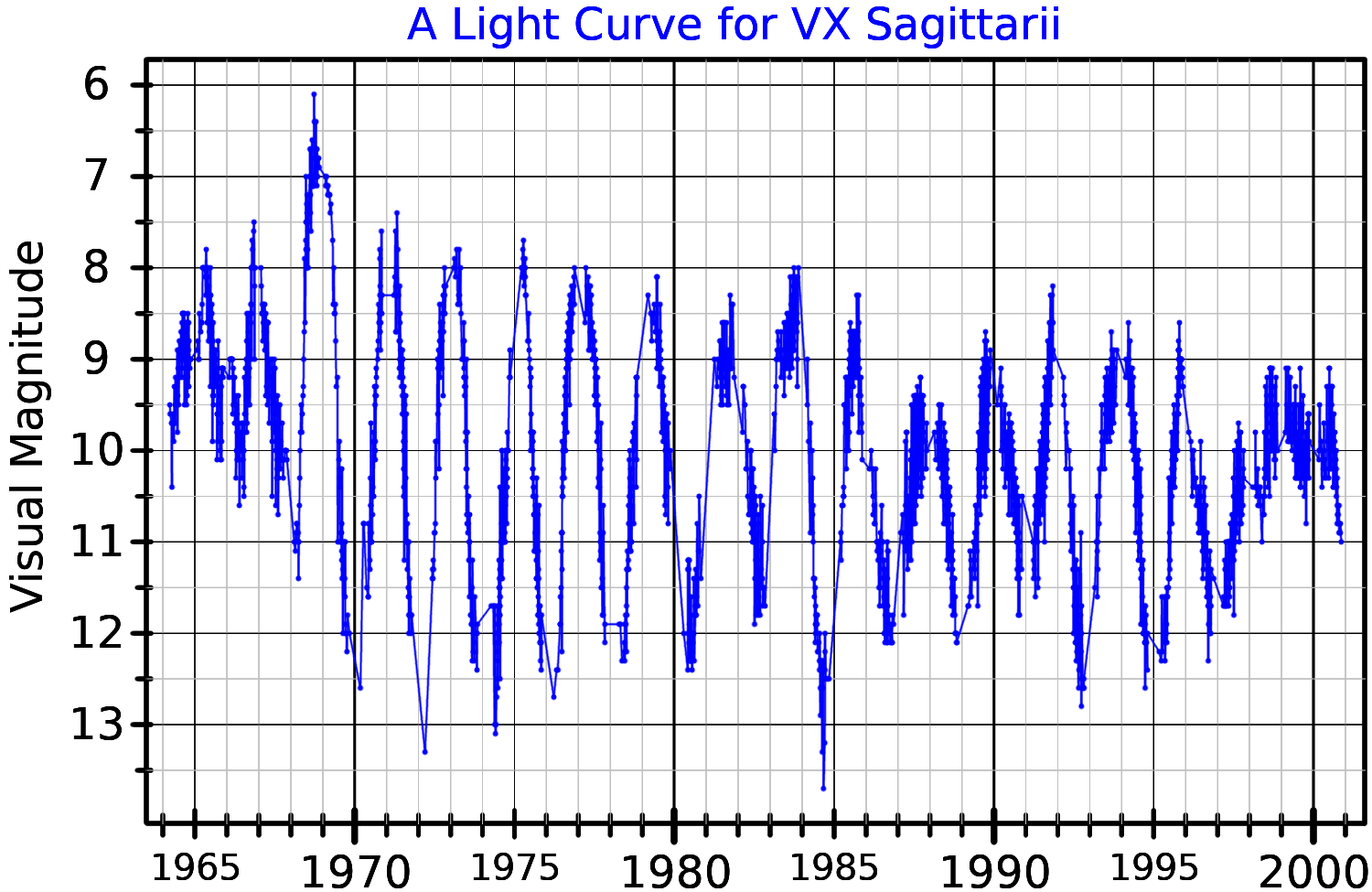
A visual band light curve for VX Sagittarii, plotted from AAVSO data

In 1904, it was announced that Henrietta Leavitt had discovered that the star, then known as BD−22°4575, is a variable star. It was given its variable star designation, VX Sagittarii, in 1911. The star is classed as a cool semiregular variable of type SRc with a pulsational period of 732 days. The variations sometimes have an amplitude comparable to a long period variable, at other times they are much smaller. The spectral type varies between M4e around visual maximum and M9.8e at minimum light, and the luminosity class is Ia, indicating a bright supergiant. The spectrum shows emission lines indicating that the star is losing mass through a strong stellar wind.

The annual parallax of VX Sagittarii has been measured as 0.64±0.06 mas, indicating a distance of about 5,100 light-years. This is compatible with the distance to Sagittarius OB1, the stellar association that VX Sagittarii is thought to belong to. Its radial velocity and proper motions are also consistent with other members of the association.

== Stellar characteristics ==
The effective temperature of VX Sagittarii is variable from around 2,400 K at visual minimum to around 3,300 K near maximum. Such low temperatures are comparable to the very coolest AGB stars and unprecedented for a massive supergiant. Its atmosphere is extended, irregular, and variable during the pulsations of the star, but the bolometric luminosity varies less than the visual brightness and is calculated to be about 195,000±62,000 L_{☉}. At an effective temperature of 3,300 K, the radius is expected to be somewhere between 1,120 R_{☉} and 1,550 R_{☉}. Older studies frequently calculated higher luminosities.

The atmosphere of VX Sgr shows molecular water layers and SiO masers in the atmosphere, typical of an OH/IR star. The SiO masers have been used to derive a distance of 1.57±0.27 kiloparsecs. The spectrum also indicates strong VO and CN. In many respects, the atmosphere is similar to low-mass AGB stars such as Mira variables, but with a supergiant's luminosity and size.

VX Sagittarii's pulsations alternate between a longer, active phase and a shorter, quiescent phase. Interferometric observations from 2018 to 2025, carried with the GRAVITY instrument aboard the Very Large Telescope, showed that during an active phase, the star was pulsating in the fundamental mode with a mean radius of 1,556±110 R_{☉} and an amplitude of about 197 R_{☉}, while in the quiescent phase, it was pulsating in the first overtone with a mean radius of 1,456±108 R_{☉} and an amplitude of only 60 R_{☉}. In September 2019, the star increased to its maximum radius, at 1,798±127 R_{☉}.

During 2020 and 2021, the star experienced a great dimming event, at the end of the active pulsation phase. This event happened due to extreme mass loss from the star and was characterized by the expansion of carbon monoxide and water atmospheric layers up to 3,200 R_{☉} in August 2021, appearance of Balmer emission in the spectrum from mid-2020 to mid-2021, and Brγ hydrogen lines in the spectrum in March 2020. This is also the first detection of Brγ lines in a single-system red supergiant.

One paper from May 2018 suggests that VX Sagitarii may be a hypergiant. This would make it one of the very rare red hypergiant stars. A 2021 paper, however, concluded that VX Sagittarii is an extreme AGB star, rather than a red supergiant or hypergiant, which would make it the most luminous known of its kind, exceeding the theoretical limit for the bolometric magnitude at −8.0. Because it displays rubidium in its spectrum and has a high mass loss and luminosity, it may be a type of AGB star known as a super-AGB star, a type of star with masses in between low-mass stars and high-mass stars. A 2026 publication found that it is very unlikely that VX Sagittarii is a super-AGB star, but instead a supergiant, as deduced from its high luminosity, large radius, and pulsational properties, which are only consistent with those of red supergiants.

== See also ==
=== Other late-type red supergiants or hypergiants ===
- AH Scorpii
- BC Cygni
- HV 11423
- IRC −10414
- MY Cephei
- NML Cygni
- S Persei
- Stephenson 2 DFK 1
- VY Canis Majoris
- Westerlund 1 W26
- WOH G64 A

=== Other Thorne–Żytkow object candidates ===
- HV 2112 – A former supergiant TŻO candidate
- HV 11417 – Another possible supergiant TŻO candidate
