= Bow shock =

Shock wave caused by blowing stellar wind

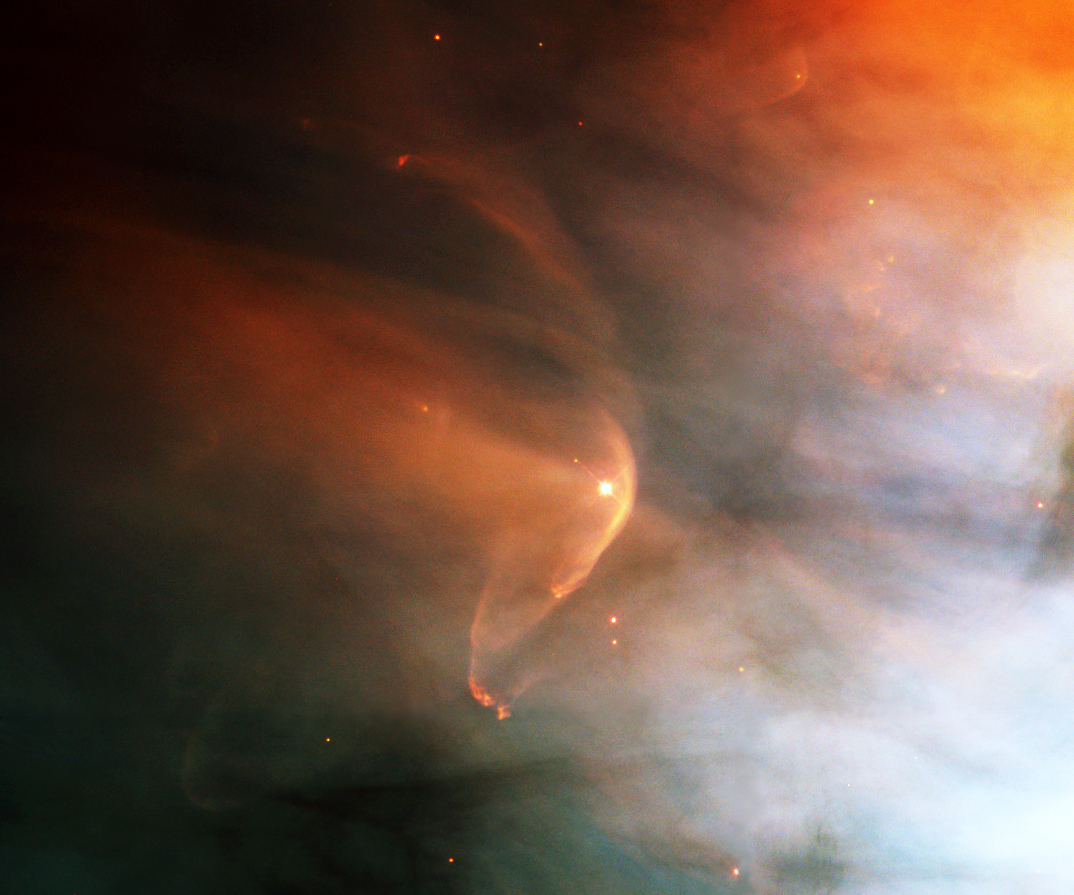
LL Orionis bow shock in Orion Nebula. The star's wind collides with the nebula flow. Hubble, 1995

In astrophysics, bow shocks are shock waves in regions where the conditions of density and pressure change dramatically due to blowing stellar wind. Bow shock occurs when the magnetosphere of an astrophysical object interacts with the nearby flowing ambient plasma such as the solar wind. For Earth and other magnetized planets, it is the boundary at which the speed of the stellar wind abruptly drops as a result of its approach to the magnetopause. For stars, this boundary is typically the edge of the astrosphere, where the stellar wind meets the interstellar medium.

== Description ==
The defining criterion of a shock wave is that the bulk velocity of the plasma drops from "supersonic" to "subsonic", where the speed of sound c_{s} is defined by $c_s^2 = \gamma p/ \rho$ where $\gamma$ is the ratio of specific heats, $p$ is the pressure, and $\rho$ is the density of the plasma.

A common complication in astrophysics is the presence of a magnetic field. For instance, the charged particles making up the solar wind follow spiral paths along magnetic field lines. The velocity of each particle as it gyrates around a field line can be treated similarly to a thermal velocity in an ordinary gas, and in an ordinary gas the mean thermal velocity is roughly the speed of sound. At the bow shock, the bulk forward velocity of the wind (which is the component of the velocity parallel to the field lines about which the particles gyrate) drops below the speed at which the particles are gyrating.

== Around the Earth ==
The best-studied example of a bow shock is that occurring where the Sun's wind encounters Earth's magnetopause, although bow shocks occur around all planets, both unmagnetized, such as Mars and Venus and magnetized, such as Jupiter or Saturn. Earth's bow shock is about 17 kilometres (11 mi) thick and located about 90,000 kilometres (56,000 mi) from the planet.

== At comets ==
Bow shocks form at comets as a result of the interaction between the solar wind and the cometary ionosphere. Far away from the Sun, a comet is an icy boulder without an atmosphere. As it approaches the Sun, the heat of the sunlight causes gas to be released from the cometary nucleus, creating an atmosphere called a coma. The coma is partially ionized by the sunlight, and when the solar wind passes through this ion coma, the bow shock appears.

The first observations were made in the 1980s and 90s as several spacecraft flew by comets 21P/Giacobini–Zinner, 1P/Halley, and 26P/Grigg–Skjellerup. It was then found that the bow shocks at comets are wider and more gradual than the sharp planetary bow shocks seen at Earth, for example. These observations were all made near perihelion when the bow shocks already were fully developed.

The Rosetta spacecraft followed comet 67P/Churyumov–Gerasimenko from far out in the Solar System, at a heliocentric distance of 3.6 AU, in toward perihelion at 1.24 AU, and back out again. This allowed Rosetta to observe the bow shock as it formed when the outgassing increased during the comet's journey toward the Sun. In this early state of development the shock was called the "infant bow shock". The infant bow shock is asymmetric and, relative to the distance to the nucleus, wider than fully developed bow shocks.

== Around pulsars ==
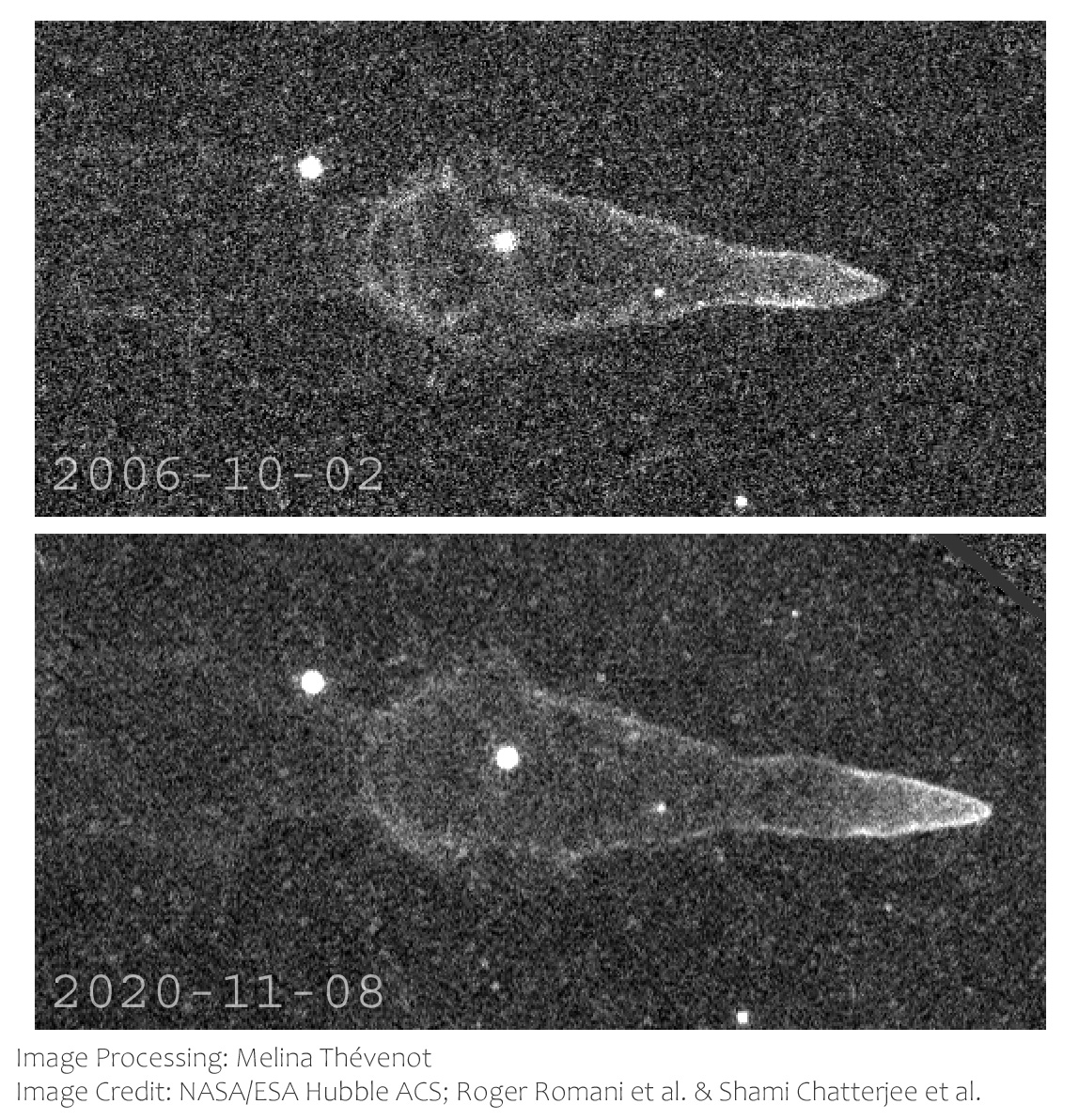
The Guitar Nebula, a bow shock around PSR B2224+65. The pulsar is not pictured and located at the very tip of the bow shock. The pulsar has a high speed of 765 km/s.

A pulsar creates a pulsar wind nebula (PWN) and pulsars still inside a supernova remnant (SNR) have their PWN and jets not deformed. Once the pulsar leaves the SNR, the sound speed decreases and the pulsar becomes supersonic. The pulsar wind is then confined by the interstellar medium (ISM) ram pressure, leading to the formation of a bow shock. In 2022 there were only 9 known pulsars associated with shocks. Examples are the Guitar Nebula around PSR B2224+65, the Dragonfly Nebula around PSR J2021+3651, PSR J0437-4517, PSR J1741-2054 and the black widow pulsar.

== Around the Sun ==
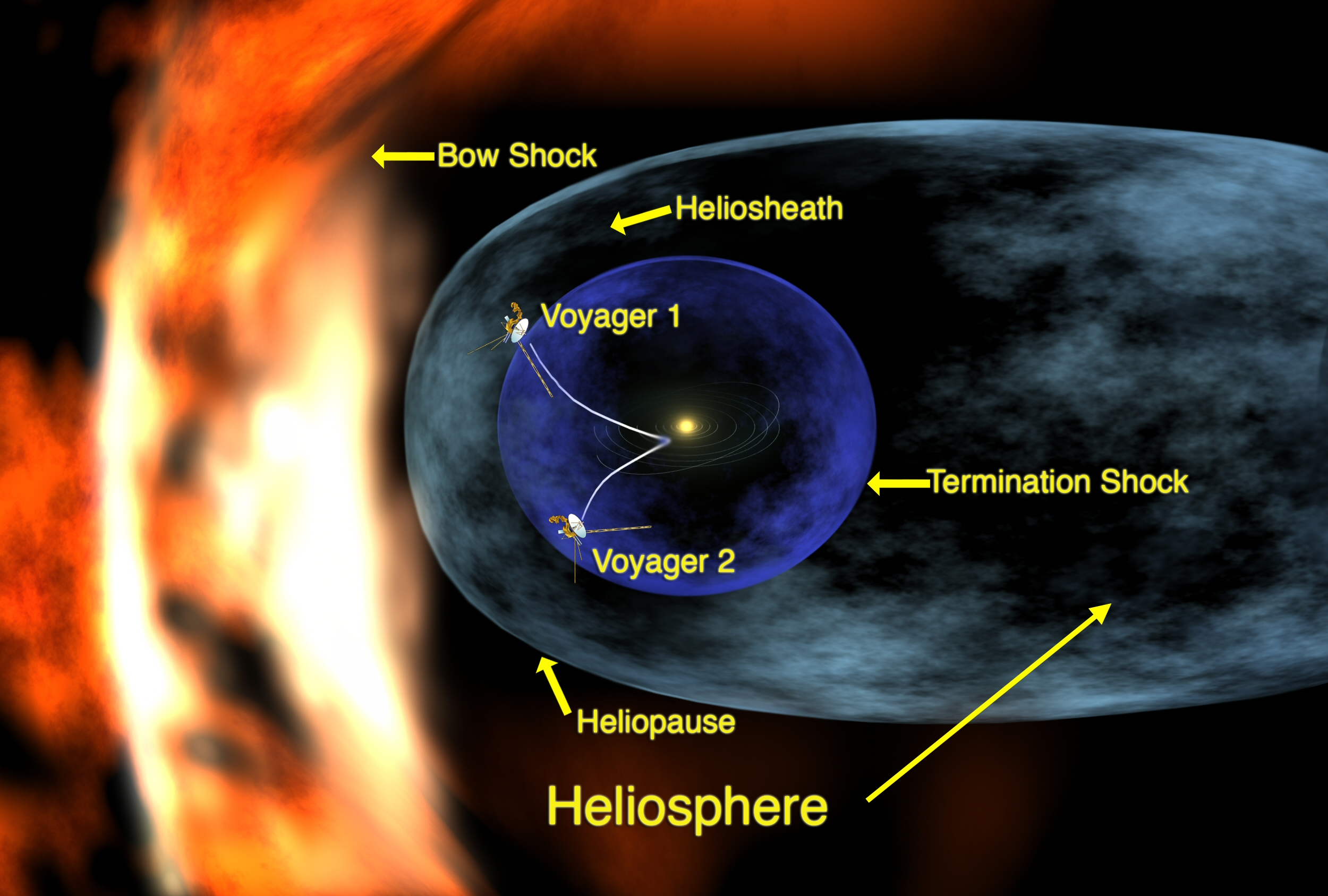
The bubble-like heliosphere moving through the interstellar medium and its different structures.

For several decades, the solar wind has been thought to form a bow shock at the edge of the heliosphere, where it collides with the surrounding interstellar medium. Moving away from the Sun, the point where the solar wind flow becomes subsonic is the termination shock, the point where the interstellar medium and solar wind pressures balance is the heliopause, and the point where the flow of the interstellar medium becomes subsonic would be the bow shock. This solar bow shock was thought to lie at a distance around 230 AU from the Sun – more than twice the distance of the termination shock as encountered by the Voyager spacecraft.

However, data obtained in 2012 from NASA's Interstellar Boundary Explorer (IBEX) indicates the lack of any solar bow shock. Along with corroborating results from the Voyager spacecraft, these findings have motivated some theoretical refinements; current thinking is that formation of a bow shock is prevented, at least in the galactic region through which the Sun is passing, by a combination of the strength of the local interstellar magnetic-field and of the relative velocity of the heliosphere.

== Around other stars ==
In 2006, a far infrared bow shock was detected near the AGB star R Hydrae.

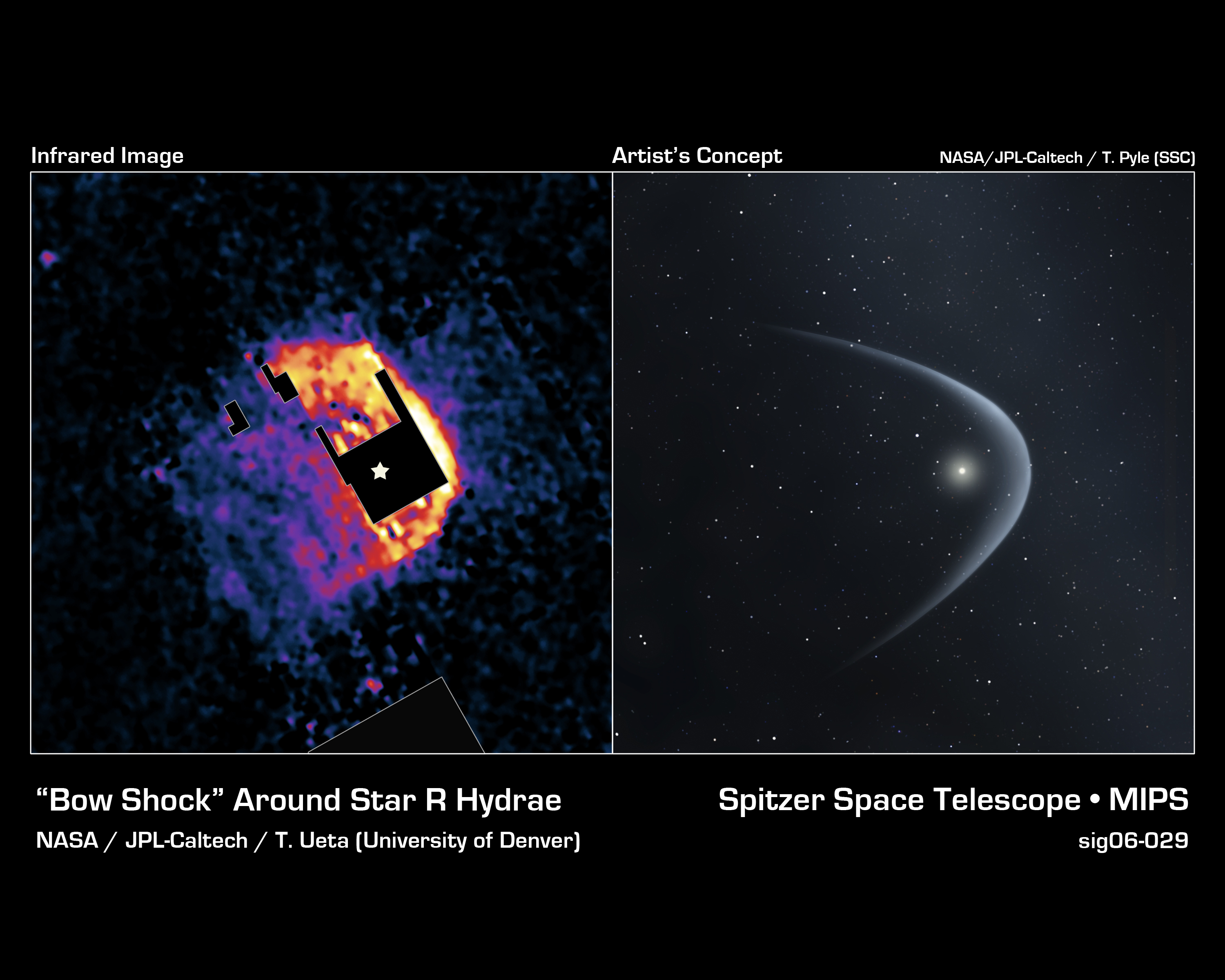
The bow shock around R Hydrae

Bow shocks are also a common feature in Herbig Haro objects, in which a much stronger collimated outflow of gas and dust from the star interacts with the interstellar medium, producing bright bow shocks that are visible at optical wavelengths.

The Hubble Space Telescope captured these images of bow shocks made of dense gasses and plasma in the Orion Nebula.

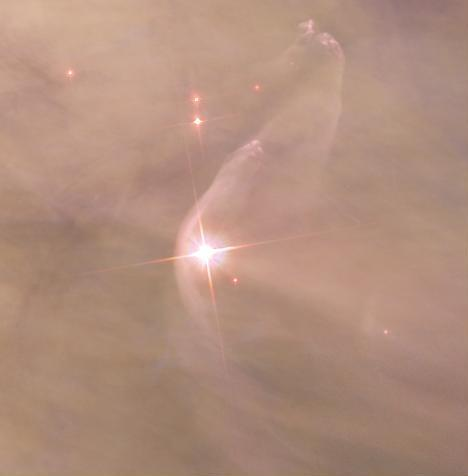

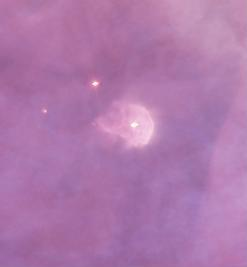

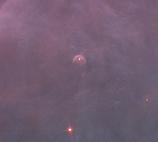

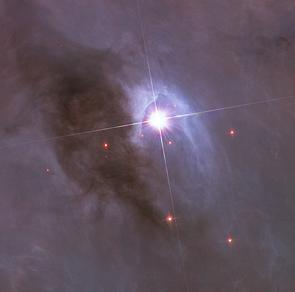

=== Around cataclysmic variable star ===
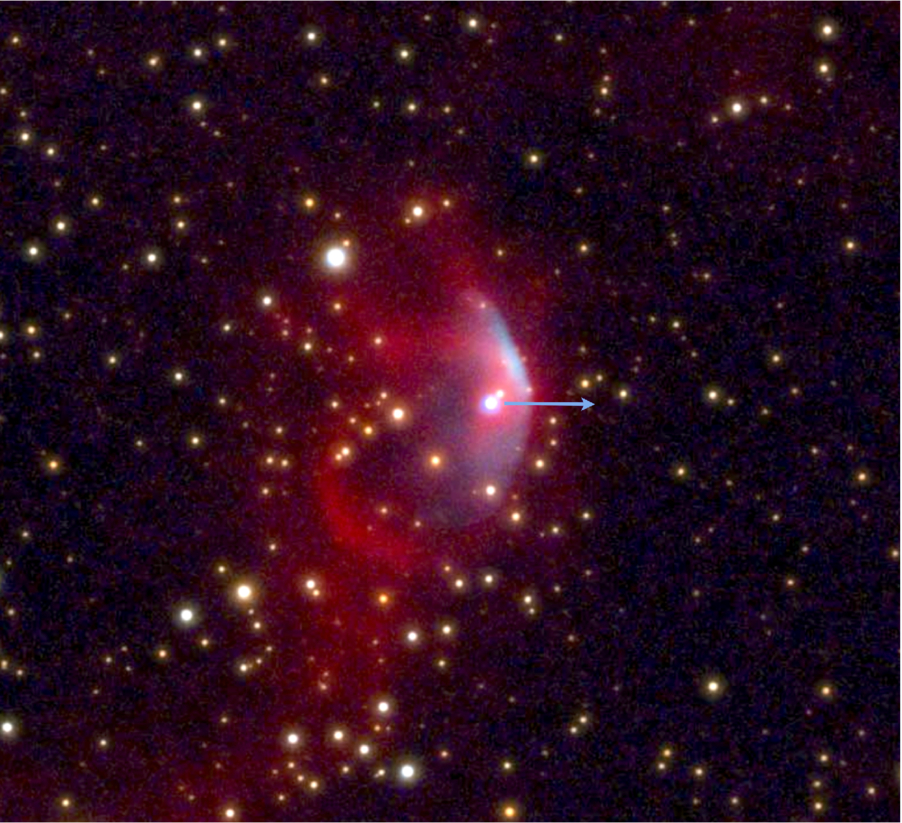
ASASJ2054

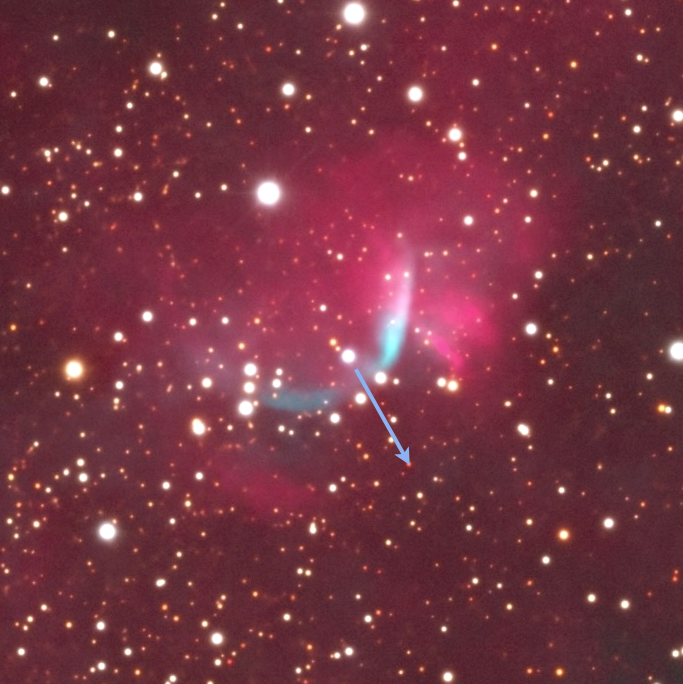
FY Vulpeculae

Two images of nebulae around two CVs, with blue-green showing [O III] and red showing H-alpha

Bow shocks also appear around six Cataclysmic variable star (CVs) with luminous accretion disks, which drive fast winds into the interstellar medium. These six CVs are: BZ Camelopardalis, V341 Ara, SY Cancri, ASASSN-V J205457.73+515731.9, LS Pegasi, and FY Vulpeculae.

Recent discoveries were partly made with the help of amateur astronomers. These nebulae usually appear in doubly ionized oxygen and are inside a larger H-alpha nebula.

=== Around massive stars ===
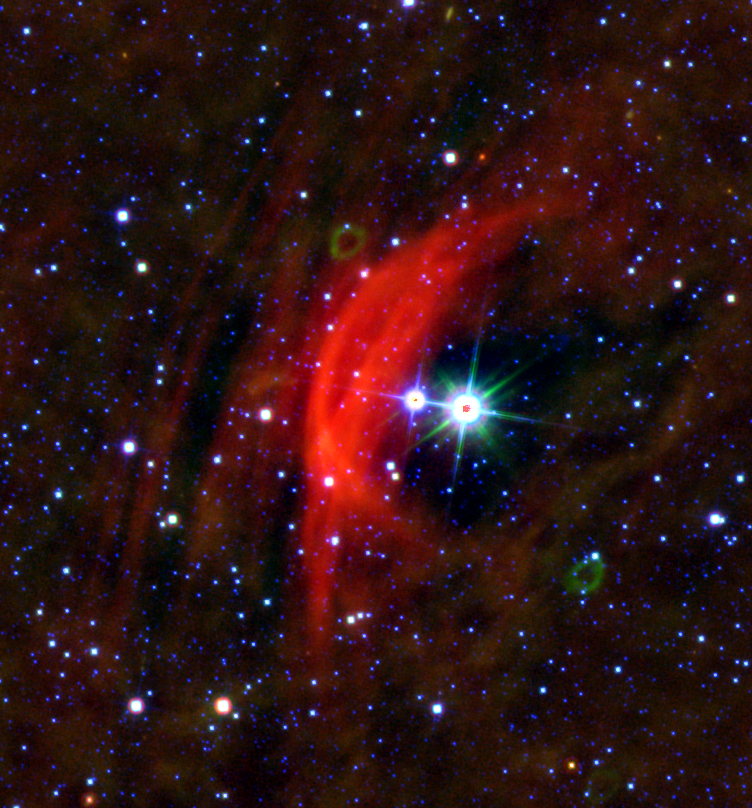
The bow shock around Beta Crucis (Mimosa), which is the less bright blue star on the middle left. unWISE image

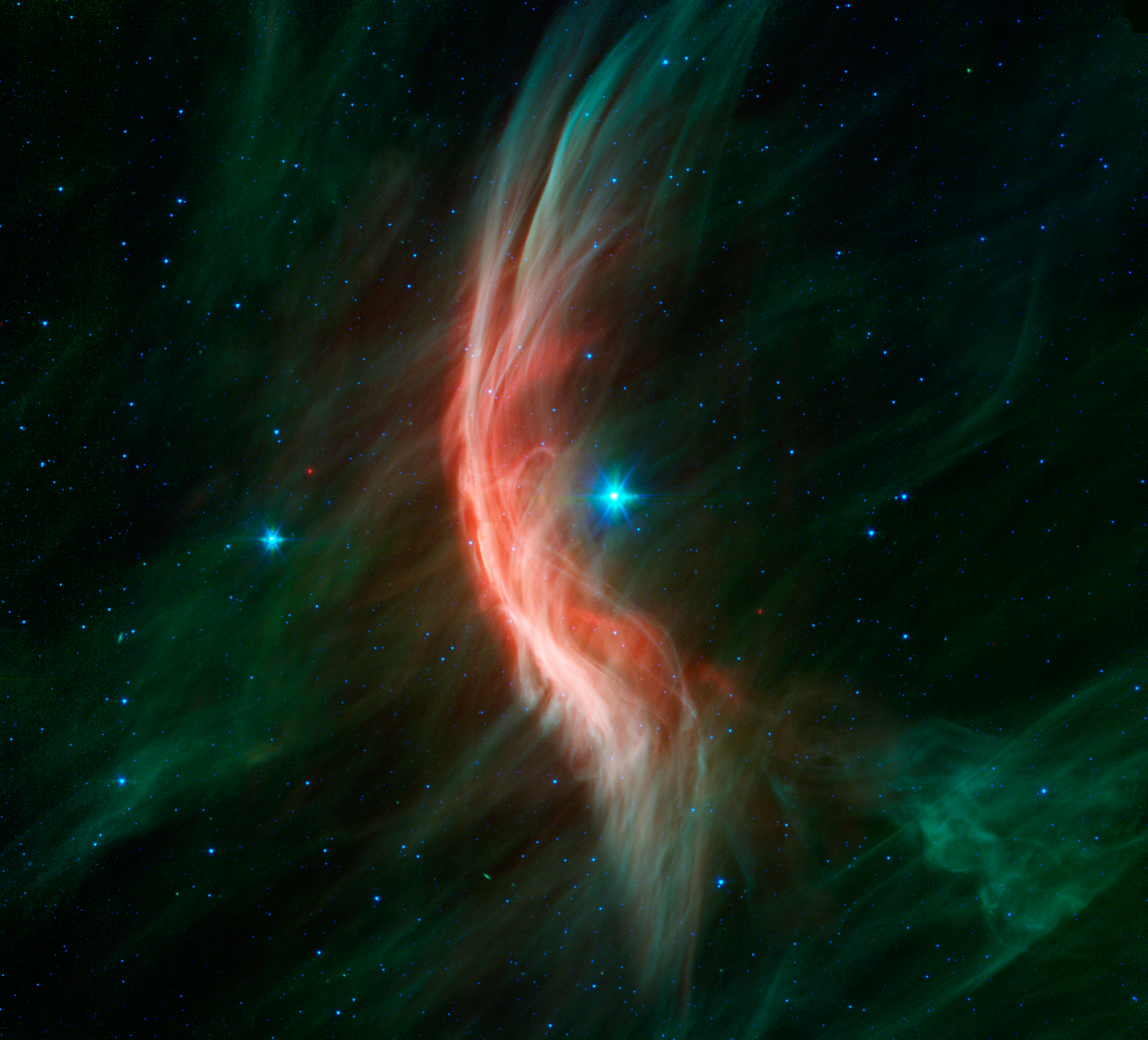
Zeta Ophiuchi is the most famous bowshock of a massive star. Image is from the Spitzer Space Telescope.

If a massive star is a runaway star, or if the interstellar medium moves relative to the star, it can form an infrared bow-shock that is detectable in 24 μm and sometimes in 8μm of the Spitzer Space Telescope or the W3/W4-channels of WISE. In 2016 Kobulnicky et al. created the largest spitzer/WISE bow-shock catalog to date with 709 bow-shock candidates. To get a larger bow-shock catalog The Milky Way Project (a Citizen Science project) did map infrared bow-shocks in the galactic plane. The search identified 311 new bow shock candidates. This larger catalog will help to understand the stellar wind of massive stars.

The closest stars with infrared bow-shocks are (within 130 parsec):

Name	Distance (pc)	Spectral type	bow shock aligned/not aligned with star motion	Belongs to
Alpha Cephei	15.04	A8Vn	not aligned	
Beta Librae	56.75	B8Vn	not aligned	
Mimosa	85.40	B1IV	not aligned	Lower Centaurus–Crux subgroup
Alpha Muscae	96.71	B2IV	not aligned	Lower Centaurus–Crux subgroup
Acrux	98.72	B0.5IV+B1V	not aligned	Lower Centaurus–Crux subgroup
Beta Muscae	104.71	B2V	not aligned	Scorpius–Centaurus association
Pi Centauri	109.65	B5Vn	not aligned	Lower Centaurus–Crux subgroup
Zeta Ophiuchi	112.23	O9.2IVnn	aligned	Upper Scorpius subgroup
Maia	117.51	B8III	aligned	Pleiades
HD 110956	117.92	B2/3V	not aligned	Lower Centaurus–Crux subgroup
HR 5906	128.87	B5V	not aligned	

Most of them belong to the Scorpius–Centaurus association.

== Magnetic draping effect ==
A similar effect, known as the magnetic draping effect, occurs when a super-Alfvénic plasma flow impacts an unmagnetized object such as what happens when the solar wind reaches the ionosphere of Venus: the flow deflects around the object draping the magnetic field along the wake flow.

The condition for the flow to be super-Alfvénic means that the relative velocity between the flow and object, $v$, is larger than the local Alfvén velocity $V_A$ which means a large Alfvénic Mach number: $M_A \gg 1$. For unmagnetized and electrically conductive objects, the ambient field creates electric currents inside the object, and into the surrounding plasma, such that the flow is deflected and slowed as the time scale of magnetic dissipation is much longer than the time scale of magnetic field advection. The induced currents in turn generate magnetic fields that deflect the flow creating a bow shock. For example, the ionospheres of Mars and Venus provide the conductive environments for the interaction with the solar wind. Without an ionosphere, the flowing magnetized plasma is absorbed by the non-conductive body. The latter occurs, for example, when the solar wind interacts with the Moon which has no ionosphere. In magnetic draping, the field lines are wrapped and draped around the leading side of the object creating a narrow sheath which is similar to the bow shocks in the planetary magnetospheres. The concentrated magnetic field increases until the ram pressure becomes comparable to the magnetic pressure in the sheath:

$$\rho_0 v^2 = \frac{B_0^2}{2\mu_0},$$

where $\rho_0$ is the density of the plasma, $B_0$ is the draped magnetic field near the object, and $v$ is the relative speed between the plasma and the object. Magnetic draping has been detected around planets, moons, solar coronal mass ejections, and galaxies.

== See also ==
- Shock wave
- Shock waves in astrophysics
- Heliosheath
- Fermi glow
- Bow shock (aerodynamics)
- IRC -10414
