= IRAS 05280−6910 =

Red supergiant star in the Large Magellanic Cloud

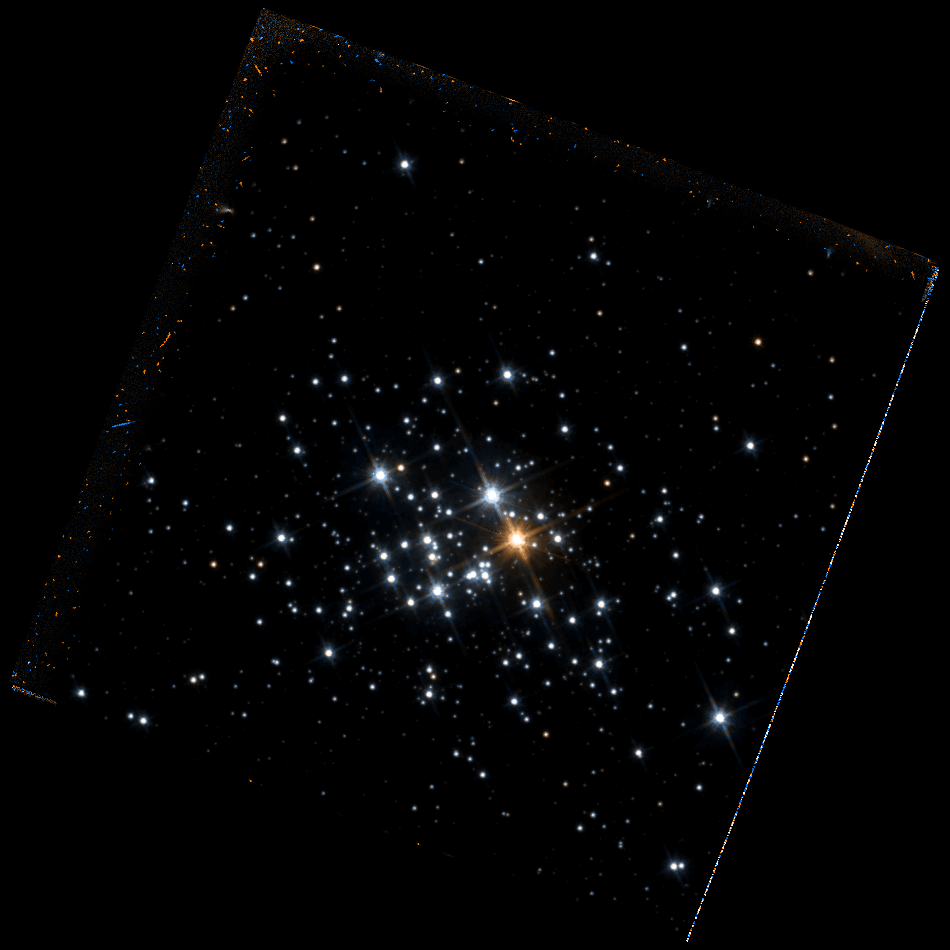
- The supergiant IRAS 05280−6910 in the open cluster NGC 1984. It is the bright reddened object near the centre Credit: Université de Strasbourg/CNRS

Observation data Epoch J2000 Equinox J2000
- Constellation: Dorado (LMC)
- Right ascension: 05^{h} 28^{m} 00.28^{s}
- Declination: −69° 10′ 26.0″

Characteristics
- Evolutionary stage: RSG (OH/IR)
- Apparent magnitude (J): 14.45
- Apparent magnitude (K): 12.87

Details
Radius	1,367 - 1,738 (Note: The radius of IRAS 05280−6910 can be calculated using the Stefan–Boltzmann law and the solar effective temperature of 5,772 K: $$\sqrt{\left(\frac{5,772}{3,400}\right)^4\cdot 225,000}= 1,367.06  \ R_\odot$$) R_{☉}
Luminosity	220,000 - 225,000 L_{☉}
Temperature	3,000 - 3,400 K

Other designations
- IRAS 05280−6910, MSX LMC 582, OH 279.6-32.6, LI-LMC 1100, NGC 1984 IR 1

Database references
SIMBAD	data

IRAS 05280−6910 (LI-LMC 1100 or NGC 1984-IRS1) is an extreme red supergiant star located in the Large Magellanic Cloud and the open cluster NGC 1984. It is more than 1,300 times larger than the Sun, making it one of the largest stars discovered so far. If placed at the center of the Solar System, its photosphere would engulf the orbit of Jupiter.

== Characteristics ==
IRAS 05280−6910 is likely an OH/IR supergiant star. It is the most reddened object in the LMC, and also shows the distinct type of maser signal similar to that of VY Canis Majoris. It has an estimated mass loss rate of 5.4×10^{−4} M_{☉} per year, one of the highest known for any red supergiant star.

Its exact radius is uncertain. According to one paper, it is 1,367 times the size of the Sun, while another says that it is 1,738 times the size of the Sun. In either case, it is among the largest stars known. IRAS 05280−6910 likely had a mass of 20 to 25 solar masses when it formed.

== See also ==
- WOH G64
- B90
- NML Cygni
- S Persei
