= OH/IR star =

Type of star

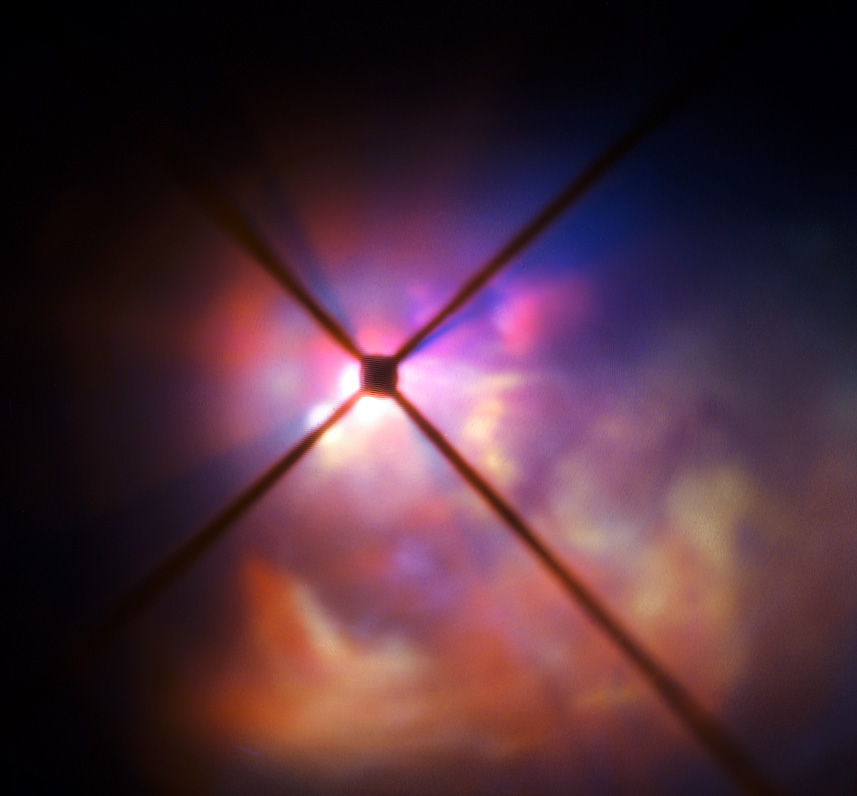
Very Large Telescope image of the surroundings of the red hypergiant VY Canis Majoris

An OH/IR star is an asymptotic giant branch (AGB), a red supergiant (RSG), or a red hypergiant (RHG) star that shows strong OH maser emission and is unusually bright at near-infrared wavelengths.

In the very late stages of AGB evolution, a star develops a super-wind with extreme mass loss. The gas in the stellar wind condenses as it cools away from the star, forming molecules such as water (H_{2}O) and silicon monoxide (SiO). This can form grains of dust, mostly silicates, which obscure the star at shorter wavelengths, leading to a strong infrared source. Hydroxyl (OH) radicals can be produced by photodissociation or collisional dissociation.

H_{2}O and OH can both be pumped to produce maser emission. OH masers in particular can give rise to a powerful maser action at 1612 MHz and this is regarded as a defining feature of the OH/IR stars. Many other AGB stars, such as Mira variables, show weaker OH masers at other wavelengths, such as 1667MHz or 22MHz.

== Examples ==
=== OH/IR stars ===
- R Aquilae
- QX Puppis
- V669 Cassiopeiae
- W43A
- HV 2112

=== OH/IR supergiants ===
- S Persei
- VX Sagittarii
- V1804 Sagittarii (Note: Although various papers considered it a luminous and peculiar very late-type red supergiant with a 1974 paper deriving a spectral type of M9.1 Iap, few papers and SIMBAD considered it a Mira variable and an AGB star.)
- VY Canis Majoris
- AH Scorpii
- MY Cephei
- PZ Cassiopeiae
- IRC −30308
- NML Cygni
- IRC +10420
- WOH G64 A
- IRAS 05280−6910
- IRC −10414
- RSGC1-F13
- CD-34 11794
