= NGC 1994 =

Open star cluster in the constellation Dorado

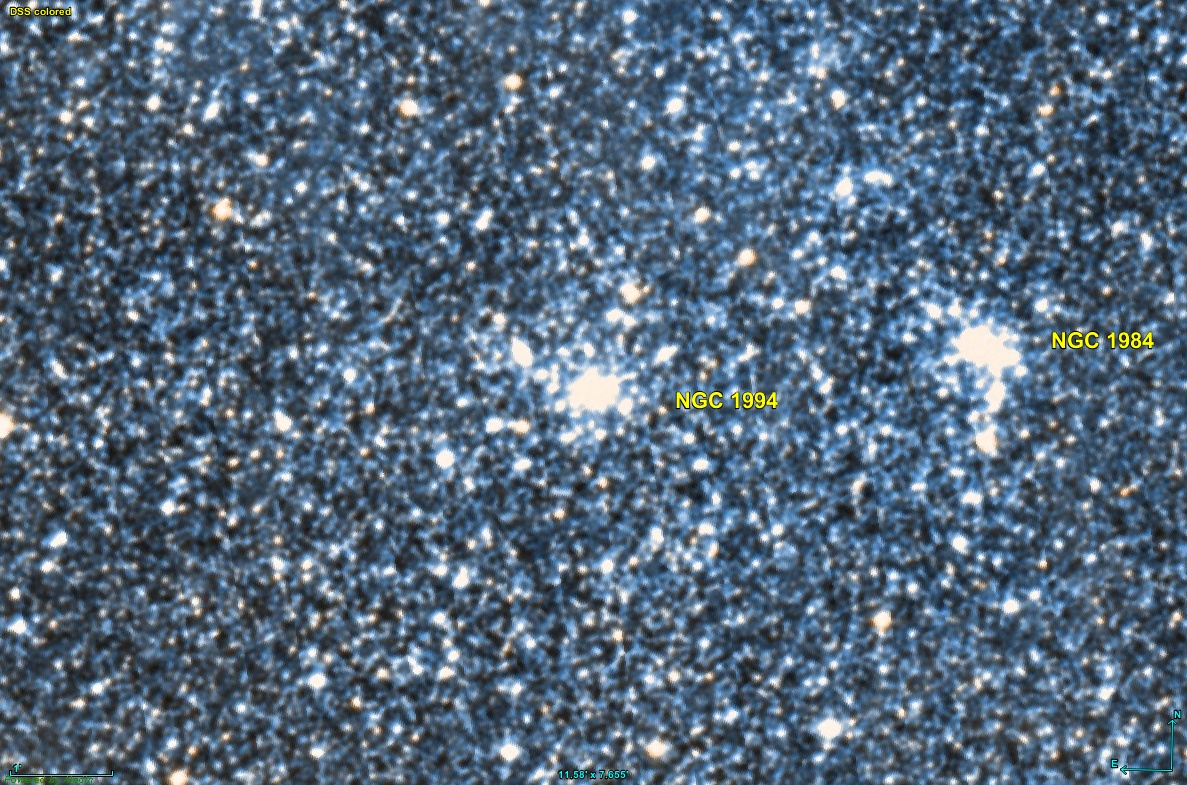
- NGC 1994, slightly centre-right is NGC 1984

Observation data (J2000.0 epoch)
- Right ascension: 05^{h} 28^{m} 51.8^{s}
- Declination: −69° 08′ 31″
- Apparent magnitude (V): 9.8
- Apparent dimensions (V): 0.60

Physical characteristics
- Other designations: ESO 56-SC136

Associations
- Constellation: Dorado

NGC 1994 (also known as ESO 56-SC136) is an open cluster in the constellation Dorado which is located in the Large Magellanic Cloud. It was discovered by John Herschel on 16 December 1835. It has an apparent magnitude of 9.8 and its size is 0.60 arc minutes.
