= Hybrid star =

Hybrid star may refer to:

- Thorne–Żytkow object (TZO), a cool evolved star that contains a neutron star
- Hybrid-chromosphere star, an evolved star with a hot corona and cool stellar wind
- A variable star that is a hybrid pulsator
- A neutron star with a quark core, forming a quark star

== See also ==
- Strange star
