= Super-AGB star =

Stars that have properties between Asymptotic Giant Branch stars and red supergiants

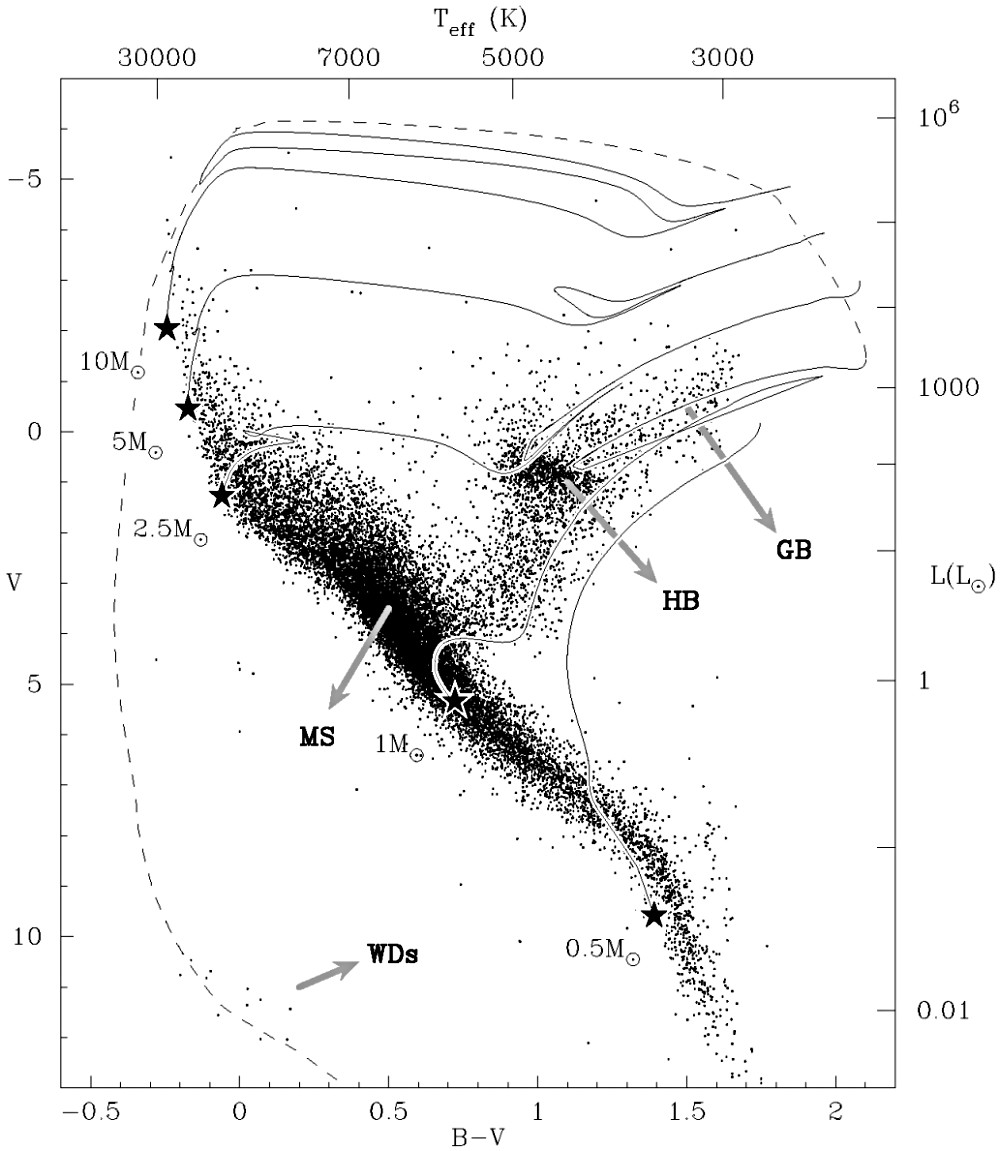
Colour-Magnitude Diagram showing evolutionary tracks for stars in the super-AGB mass range

A super-AGB star is a star with a mass intermediate between those that end their lives as a white dwarf and those that end with a core collapse supernova, and properties intermediate between asymptotic giant branch (AGB) stars and red supergiants. They have initial masses of 7.5–9.25 M_{☉} in stellar-evolutionary models, but have exhausted their core hydrogen and helium, left the main sequence, and expanded to become large, cool, and luminous.

== HR diagram ==
Super-AGB stars occupy the top-right of the Hertzsprung–Russell diagram (HR diagram), and have cool temperatures between 3,000 and 4,000 K, which is similar to normal AGB stars and red supergiant stars (RSG stars). These cool temperatures allow molecules to form in their photospheres and atmospheres. Super-AGB stars emit most of their light in the infra-red spectrum because of their extremely cool temperatures.

== The Chandrasekhar limit and their life ==
A super-AGB star's core may grow to (or past) the Chandrasekhar mass because of continued hydrogen (H) and helium (He) shell burning, ending as core-collapse supernovae. The most massive super-AGB stars (at around 8-9 M_{☉}) are theorized to end in electron capture supernovae. The error in this determination due to uncertainties in the third dredge-up efficiency and AGB mass-loss rate could lead to about a doubling of the number of electron-capture supernovae, which also supports the theory that these stars make up 66% of the supernovae detected by satellites.

These stars are at a similar stage in life to red giant stars, such as Aldebaran, Mira, and Chi Cygni, and are at a stage where they start to brighten, and their brightness tends to vary, along with their size and temperature.

These stars represent a transition to the more massive supergiant stars that undergo full fusion of elements heavier than helium. During the triple-alpha process, some elements heavier than carbon are also produced: mostly oxygen, but also some magnesium, neon, and even heavier elements, gaining an oxygen-neon (ONe) core. Super-AGB stars develop partially degenerate carbon–oxygen cores that are large enough to ignite carbon in a flash analogous to the earlier helium flash. The second dredge-up is very strong in this mass range and that keeps the core size below the level required for burning of neon as occurs in higher-mass supergiants.

== List of super-AGB candidates ==
Candidate	Right ascension	Declination	Location	Discovery	Notes	Refs
HV 2112	01^{h} 10^{m} 03.87^{s}	−72° 36′ 52.6″	Small Magellanic Cloud	1967	Classified formerly as a supergiant TZO candidate, as a possible foreground galactic S-type star, and as an unresolved multiple star	
MSX SMC 055	00^{h} 50^{m} 07.2^{s}	−73° 31′ 25.1″	Small Magellanic Cloud	1988	Considered to be a likely super-AGB star candidate	
VX Sagittarii	18^{h} 08^{m} 04.04831^{s}	−22° 13′ 26.6327″	Sagittarius	1904	Commonly classified as an unusually cool red supergiant or red hypergiant.	
LI-LMC 60	04^{h} 49^{m} 41.5^{s}	-68° 37′ 51.23″	Large Magellanic Cloud	1988	A M10 luminous star in the Large Magellanic Cloud.	
