= W43A =

X-ray star in the constellation Aquila

Observation data Epoch J2000 Equinox ICRS
- Constellation: Aquila
- Right ascension: 18^{h} 47^{m} 41.14^{s}
- Declination: −01° 45′ 11.4″

Characteristics
- Spectral type: OH
- Variable type: Asymptotic giant branch

Astrometry
Radial velocity (R_{v})	34 km/s
Distance	2220+380 −400 pc

Details
Luminosity	12,000 L_{☉}

Other designations
- W 43A, IRAS 18450−0148, 2MASS J18474097−0144553

Database references
SIMBAD	data

W43A or IRAS 18450−0148 is a late-type star with an envelope of OH/IR type with a magnetically collimated jet (a protoplanetary nebula). The star is in the early stages of becoming a planetary nebula, a process that will take several thousand years.
