= NGC 7419 =

Open cluster in the constellation Cepheus

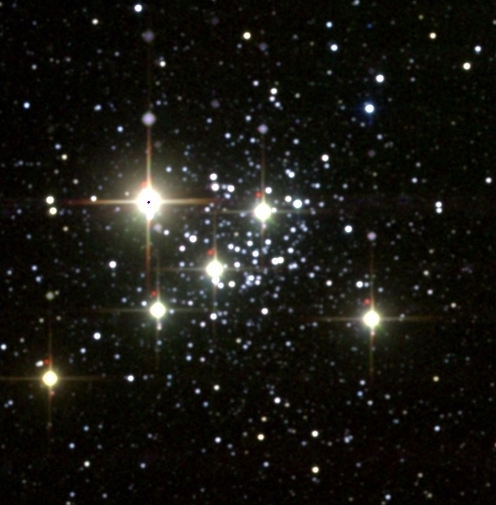
- NGC 7419 in infrared, highlighting the five red supergiants, plus the foreground Carbon star MZ Cep at lower left Credit: 2MASS

Observation data (J2000 epoch)
- Right ascension: 22^{h} 54^{m} 20^{s}
- Declination: +60° 48′ 54″
- Distance: 2,930+320 −260 pc
- Apparent magnitude (V): 13
- Apparent dimensions (V): 2′

Physical characteristics
- Other designations: Collinder 453

Associations
- Constellation: Cepheus

NGC 7419 is an open cluster in the constellation Cepheus. It is heavily reddened and notable for containing five red supergiants, the highest number known in any cluster until the end of the 20th century, but probably no blue supergiants.

== Members ==
The brightest of the five red supergiants is the exceptionally cool MY Cephei. It has a spectral type of M7.5 which is one of the latest spectral types of any supergiant, although analysis is made difficult by the lack of comparable standard stars. It is estimated to have an effective temperature around 3,000 K and a bolometric luminosity more than 100,000 L_{☉}. MY Cephei is a semiregular variable star with a brightness range of magnitude 14.4 - 15.3.

The brightest hot stars in the cluster have a spectral type of BC2, indicating B2 stars with enhanced levels of carbon. One has a bright giant luminosity class of II, while the other has a luminosity class of Ib-II, indicating it is either a bright giant or supergiant. The hotter stars of the cluster are visually faint due to around six magnitudes of interstellar extinction.

The lack of blue supergiants, particularly in a cluster of just the right size and age to include five red supergiants, is unusual. Such low ratios of blue:red supergiants occur in low metallicity clusters, but NGC 7419 is young and has near-solar metallicity. Rapidly rotating stars may account for this evolutionary trend, encouraging high mass loss and rapid evolution of massive stars into red supergiants. This conclusion is also consistent with the high proportion of Be stars in the cluster.

The age of the cluster is calculated to be 14±2 million years. Clusters of this age are expected to have a main sequence turnoff at spectral type B1, and this is seen in NGC 7419. 1,200 M_{☉} of B-type stars alone are observed, implying a total cluster mass of 7,000 - 10,000 M_{☉}.

== Non-members ==
Visible in the same field and as prominent as the red supergiants in infrared images is the carbon star MZ Cephei, which is much closer to us than NGC 7419. It is a slow irregular variable star with a range of 14.7 - 15.4.

The visually brightest star in the core region of the cluster is a yellow giant, placed at around 500 parsecs by Gaia astrometry. The even brighter nearby star HD 216721 is also a foreground object. Further out still from the centre of the cluster is the 7th magnitude eclipsing binary V453 Cephei, around 250 parsecs distant from us.

== See also ==
- Stephenson 2
- RSGC1
