= MY Cephei =

Red supergiant star in the constellation Cepheus

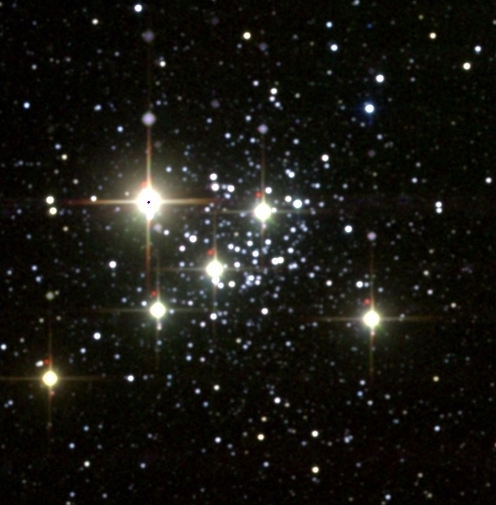
- MY Cephei is the brightest star in this infrared image of NGC 7419. Credit: 2MASS

Observation data Epoch J2000.0 Equinox J2000.0
- Constellation: Cepheus
- Right ascension: 22^{h} 54^{m} 31.698^{s}
- Declination: +60° 49′ 38.97″
- Apparent magnitude (V): 14.4–15.5

Characteristics
- Evolutionary stage: OH/IR extreme red supergiant or red hypergiant
- Spectral type: M3, M7–7.5 I (M6–7Iab)
- Apparent magnitude (G): 10.225
- Apparent magnitude (H): 2.98
- Apparent magnitude (K): 2.14
- Variable type: SRc

Astrometry
Proper motion (μ)	RA: –2.637 mas/yr Dec.: –1.883 mas/yr
Parallax (π)	0.3398±0.0708 mas
Distance	3,000+350 −290 pc

Details
Mass	14.5 M_{☉}
Radius	1,028+200 −168 – 1,137+453 −324 (Note: Applying the Stefan-Boltzmann Law with a nominal solar effective temperature of 5,772 K: $$\sqrt{(5,772/3,595)^4 \times 158,890} = 1,028\ R_\odot$$ $$\sqrt{(5,772/3,595)^4 \times 194,580} = 1,137\ R_\odot$$) R_{☉}
Luminosity	159,000+60,000 −44,000 – 195,000+173,000 −92,000 (Note: Calculated using the following equation: $$10^{0.4\left( 4.74-\left( \text{m}_{\text{bol}} +5-5\,\text{log}\,d\right) \right)}$$, where m_{bol} is the star's apparent bolometric magnitude and d is the distance in parsecs. The values used for m_{bol} are 4.29±0.35 and 4.07±0.69 respectively, while the value used for the d is 3,240 parsecs.) L_{☉}
Temperature	3,595±31 K
Age	9 Myr

Other designations
- RAFGL 2987, MY Cep, IRAS 22525+6033, IRC +60375, 2MASS J22543171+6049388

Database references
SIMBAD	data

MY Cephei (abbreviated to MY Cep), also known as IRC +60375, is a red supergiant or hypergiant located in the open cluster NGC 7419 in the constellation of Cepheus. It is a semiregular variable star with a maximum brightness of magnitude 14.4 and a minimum of magnitude 15.5.

== Observations and variability ==
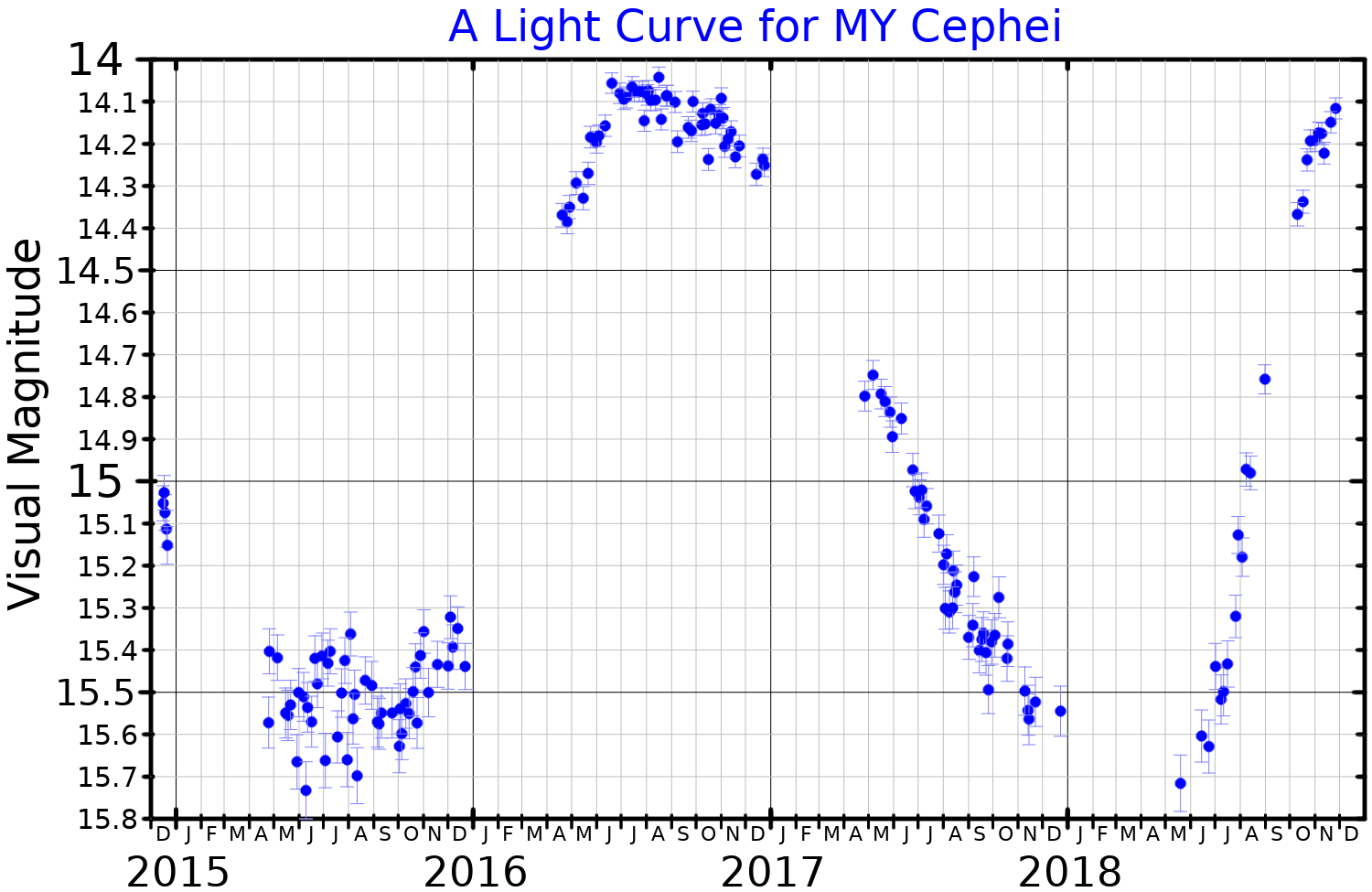
A visual band light curve for MY Cephei, plotted from ASAS-SN data

Observations of the open cluster NGC 7419 in 1954 showed that four of its members were luminous red stars, most likely red supergiants. In addition, an unusually red star was found to be variable and probably an even more luminous supergiant. This star was given the variable star designation MY Cephei in 1973 in the 59th name-list of variable stars.

MY Cephei is classified as semiregular variable star of sub-type SRc, indicating it is a cool supergiant, although its pulsational period is not known. It has been observed as bright as magnitude 14.4 and as faint as magnitude 15.5. The star, along with another late red supergiant star, S Persei, are sometimes considered prototypes for the class of M6–7 supergiants.

== Distance ==
The distance of MY Cephei is assumed to be around 9,780+1,140
−950 light years or 3,000+350
−290 parsecs based on it being a member of the NGC 7419 open cluster. Gaia Early Data Release 3 gives a parallax of 0.3398±0.0708 mas for MY Cep, implying a similar distance of 2,691+511
−419 pc.

== Stellar properties ==
The spectral type of MY Cephei is given in the General Catalogue of Variable Stars as M6–7 Iab, indicating the star is an intermediate-size luminous supergiant star, although most authors gives M7–M7.5 I. Classification is difficult because of the lack of comparable standard stars, but its spectrum appears to be later than M5, earlier than VX Sagittarii when at M9, and more luminous than M7 giant stars. A 2021 study gives a spectral class of M3 based on infrared observations, and a correspondingly higher temperature.

MY Cephei is a very luminous, cool and large extreme supergiant star, with a luminosity more than 100,000 times that of the Sun (L_{☉}) and a radius in excess of a thousand times the Sun's radius (R_{☉}). It is likely the most luminous, coolest, and the largest supergiant star in its open cluster, and occupies the upper-right hand corner of the Hertzsprung–Russell diagram.

A 2018 paper gives the star a temperature of 3,400 K, corresponding a radius of 1,134 R_{☉} based on a luminosity of 155,000 L_{☉}. The mass of MY Cephei is uncertain, but expected to be around 14.5 times the Sun's mass (M_{☉}). Mass is being lost at (2.3±0.3)×10^{−5} M_{☉} per year, one of highest mass loss rates known for a supergiant star.

A study from 2020 based on SED integration gives an unexpectedly higher bolometric luminosity of 310,000±70,000 L_{☉}, close to the empirical upper luminosity limit of red supergiants (i.e. Humphreys–Davidson limit). This implies a higher radius of 2,060 ± 230 R_{☉} based on an effective temperature of 3,000 K derived using the DUSTY model, considerably larger than the upper radius limit of red supergiants at roughly 1,500 R_{☉} respectively. Older studies frequently calculated even more lower temperatures and an estimated radius of 2,400 R_{☉}.

== See also ==
- Blue straggler – a type of star more luminous than an ordinary star, typically found in a stellar cluster
- NML Cygni — another late-type red supergiant or hypergiant star.
- VY Canis Majoris — another large and luminous late-type red supergiant or hypergiant star.
