= Thorne–Żytkow object =

Hypothetical hybrid star type

A Thorne–Żytkow object (TŻO or TZO) is a conjectured type of hybrid star wherein a red giant or red supergiant contains a neutron star at its core, formed from the collision of the giant with the neutron star. Such objects were hypothesized by Kip Thorne and Anna Żytkow in 1977. In 2014, it was discovered that the star HV 2112, located in the Small Magellanic Cloud (SMC), was a strong candidate, though this view has since been refuted. Another possible candidate is the star HV 11417, also located in the SMC.

== Formation ==
A Thorne–Żytkow object would be formed when a neutron star collides with another star, often a red giant or supergiant. The colliding objects can simply be wandering stars, though this is only likely to occur in extremely crowded globular clusters. Alternatively, the neutron star could form in a binary system when one of the two stars goes supernova. Because no supernova is perfectly symmetric, and because the binding energy of the binary changes with the mass lost in the supernova, the neutron star will be left with some velocity relative to its original orbit. This kick may cause its new orbit to intersect with its companion, or, if its companion is a main-sequence star, it may be engulfed when its companion evolves into a red giant.

If a neutron star and a white dwarf merge, this could form a Thorne–Żytkow object with the properties of an R Coronae Borealis variable.

== Properties ==
The surface of the neutron star is very hot, with temperatures exceeding 10^{9} K, hotter than the cores of all but the most massive stars. This heat is dominated either by nuclear fusion in the accreting gas or by compression of the gas by the neutron star's gravity. Because of the high temperature, unusual nuclear processes may take place as the envelope of the red giant falls onto the neutron star's surface. Hydrogen may fuse to produce a different mixture of isotopes than it does in ordinary stellar nucleosynthesis, and some astronomers have proposed that the rapid proton nucleosynthesis that occurs in X-ray bursts also takes place inside Thorne–Żytkow objects.

Observationally, a Thorne–Żytkow object may resemble a red supergiant, or, if it is hot enough to blow off the hydrogen-rich surface layers, a nitrogen-rich Wolf–Rayet star (type WN8).

A TŻO has an estimated lifespan of 10^{5}–10^{6} years. Given this lifespan, it is possible that between 20 and 200 Thorne-Żytkow objects currently exist in the Milky Way.

The only way to unambiguously determine whether or not a star is a TŻO is a multi-messenger detection of both the gravitational waves of the inner neutron star and an optical spectrum of the metals atypical of a normal red supergiant. It is possible to detect pre-existing TŻOs with current LIGO detectors; the neutron star core would emit a continuous wave.

== Dissolution ==
It has been theorized that mass loss will eventually end the TŻO stage, with the remaining envelope converted to a disk, resulting in the formation of a neutron star with a massive accretion disk. These neutron stars may form the population of isolated pulsars with accretion disks. The massive accretion disk may also collapse into a new star, becoming a stellar companion to the neutron star. The neutron star may also accrete sufficient material to collapse into a black hole.

== Observation history ==
In 2014, a team led by Emily Levesque argued that the star HV 2112 had unusually high abundances of elements such as molybdenum, rubidium, lithium, and calcium, and a high luminosity. Since both are expected characteristics of Thorne–Żytkow objects, this led the team to suggest that HV 2112 might be the first discovery of a TŻO. However, this claim was challenged in a 2018 paper by Emma Beasor and collaborators, who argued that there is no evidence for HV 2112 having any unusual abundance patterns beyond a possible enrichment of lithium and that its luminosity is too low. They put forth another candidate, HV 11417, based on an apparent over-abundance of rubidium and a similar luminosity as HV 2112.

== List of candidate TŻOs ==
Candidate	Right ascension	Declination	Location	Discovery	Notes	Refs
HV 2112	01^{h} 10^{m} 03.87^{s}	−72° 36′ 52.6″	Small Magellanic Cloud	2014	Classified as a supergiant TŻO candidate or an AGB star	
HV 11417	01^{h} 00^{m} 48.2^{s}	−72° 51′ 02.1″	Small Magellanic Cloud	2018	Classified as an AGB star	
VX Sagittarii	18^{h} 08^{m} 04.04831^{s}	−22° 13′ 26.6327″	Sagittarius	2021	Classified as red supergiant, red hypergiant, or a possible but unlikely super-AGB star	
V595 Cassiopeiae	01^{h} 43^{m} 02.72^{s}	+56° 30′ 46.02″	Cassiopeia	2002		
IO Persei	03^{h} 06^{m} 47.27^{s}	+55° 43′ 59.35″	Perseus	2002		
KN Cassiopeiae	00^{h} 09^{m} 36.37^{s}	+62° 40′ 04.12″	Cassiopeia	2002		
U Aquarii	22^{h} 03^{m} 19.69^{s}	−16° 37′ 35.2″	Aquarius	1999	Catalogued as a R Coronae Borealis variable	
VZ Sagittarii	18^{h} 15^{m} 08.58^{s}	−29° 42′ 29.6″	Sagittarius	1999	Catalogued as a R Coronae Borealis variable	

== List of candidate former and future TŻOs ==
Candidate former TŻO	Right ascension	Declination	Location	Discovery	Notes	Refs
GRO J1655-40	16^{h} 54^{m} 00.14^{s}	−39° 50′ 44.9″	Scorpius	1995	The progenitor for both the companion star and the black hole in this system is hypothesized to have been a TŻO.	
BD+61 2536 (TIC 470710327)	23^{h} 49^{m} 18.99^{s}	+61° 57′ 46.0″	Cassiopeia	2022	Massive hierarchical triple star system that could evolve either into a neutron-star merger or a TŻO.	

== See also ==
- Quasar – Active galactic nucleus (AGN) containing a supermassive black hole
- Quasi-star – Hypothetical early-universe star with a black hole core
