= V669 Cassiopeiae =

Star in Cassiopeia

Observation data Epoch J2000.0 Equinox ICRS
- Constellation: Cassiopeia
- Right ascension: 01^{h} 33^{m} 51.21^{s}
- Declination: +62° 26′ 53.2″
- Apparent magnitude (V): 17.48

Characteristics
- Evolutionary stage: AGB
- Spectral type: M9III
- Apparent magnitude (J): 16.747
- Apparent magnitude (H): 11.232
- Apparent magnitude (K): 7.097
- Variable type: Mira?

Astrometry
| Distance | 2,100 pc |

Details
| Radius | 370 – 702 R_{☉} |
| Luminosity | 10,000 - 36,000 L_{☉} |
| Temperature | 3,000 K |

Database references
| SIMBAD | data |

V669 Cassiopeiae or V669 Cas is an OH/IR star, a type of particularly cool red giant, with a spectral type of M9III.

With a mean visual apparent magnitude 17.5, V669 Cassiopeiae varies with an amplitude of about half a magnitude. In the mid-infrared L band, its magnitude range is 1.57 to 3.02. It is listed as a possible Mira variable, but with the extremely long period of 1,994 days.

Jan Herman and Harm Jan Habing reported in 1985 that the star's OH maser emission varied in intensity with a 1994 day period. In 1990, Paolo Persi et al. showed that V669 Cassiopeiae varied in infrared brightness, and for that reason it was given its variable star designation in 1993.

The distance and physical properties of V669 Cassiopeiae are highly uncertain. Based on parallax, it is about 1,600 light years away, but a distance of about 20,000 light years has been derived based on observations of masers around the star. Based on a luminosity derived from its pulsations and spectral energy distribution, it would be at a distance of 6,850 light years.

== See also ==
- List of largest known stars
