= HV 11417 =

Candidate Thorne–Żytkow object in the constellation Tucana

Observation data Epoch J2000 Equinox ICRS
- Constellation: Tucana
- Right ascension: 01^{h} 00^{m} 48.17^{s}
- Declination: −72° 51′ 02.1″
- Apparent magnitude (V): 19.83

Characteristics
- Evolutionary stage: M-type supergiant, Thorne–Żytkow object?
- Spectral type: M5Ie

Astrometry
| Proper motion (μ) | RA: +0.593 mas/yr Dec.: −1.282 mas/yr |
| Distance | ~60,000 pc |

Details
| Mass | 18.4 M_{☉} |
| Radius | 800 (Note: Calculated, using the Stefan-Boltzmann law and the star's effective temperature and luminosity, with respect to the solar nominal effective temperature of 5,772 K: $$\sqrt{\biggl(\frac{5,772}{3,450}\biggr)^4 \cdot 81,283} = 800\ R_\odot.$$) R_{☉} |
| Luminosity | 81,283 L_{☉} |
| Surface gravity (log g) | 0.47 cgs |
| Temperature | 3,450 K |

Other designations
- HV 11417, PMMR 113, TIC 182293383

Database references
| SIMBAD | data |

HV 11417 is a candidate Thorne–Żytkow object in the Small Magellanic Cloud, put forward in a paper by Emma Beasor and collaborators. The paper also claims that another candidate for the Thorne–Żytkow object, HV 2112, was not a Thorne–Żytkow object because it seemingly lacked any distinguishing quality which would indicate that classification. It has since been reported that HV 11417 may be a foreground halo star. As of Gaia's 3rd data release the star has been measured to have a negative parallax, suggesting a distance of more than 103,000 light-years (32,000 pc) at the 3-sigma level, and a proper motion consistent with Small Magellanic Cloud stars in its region of the galaxy.
