= HD 110956 =

Star in the constellation Crux

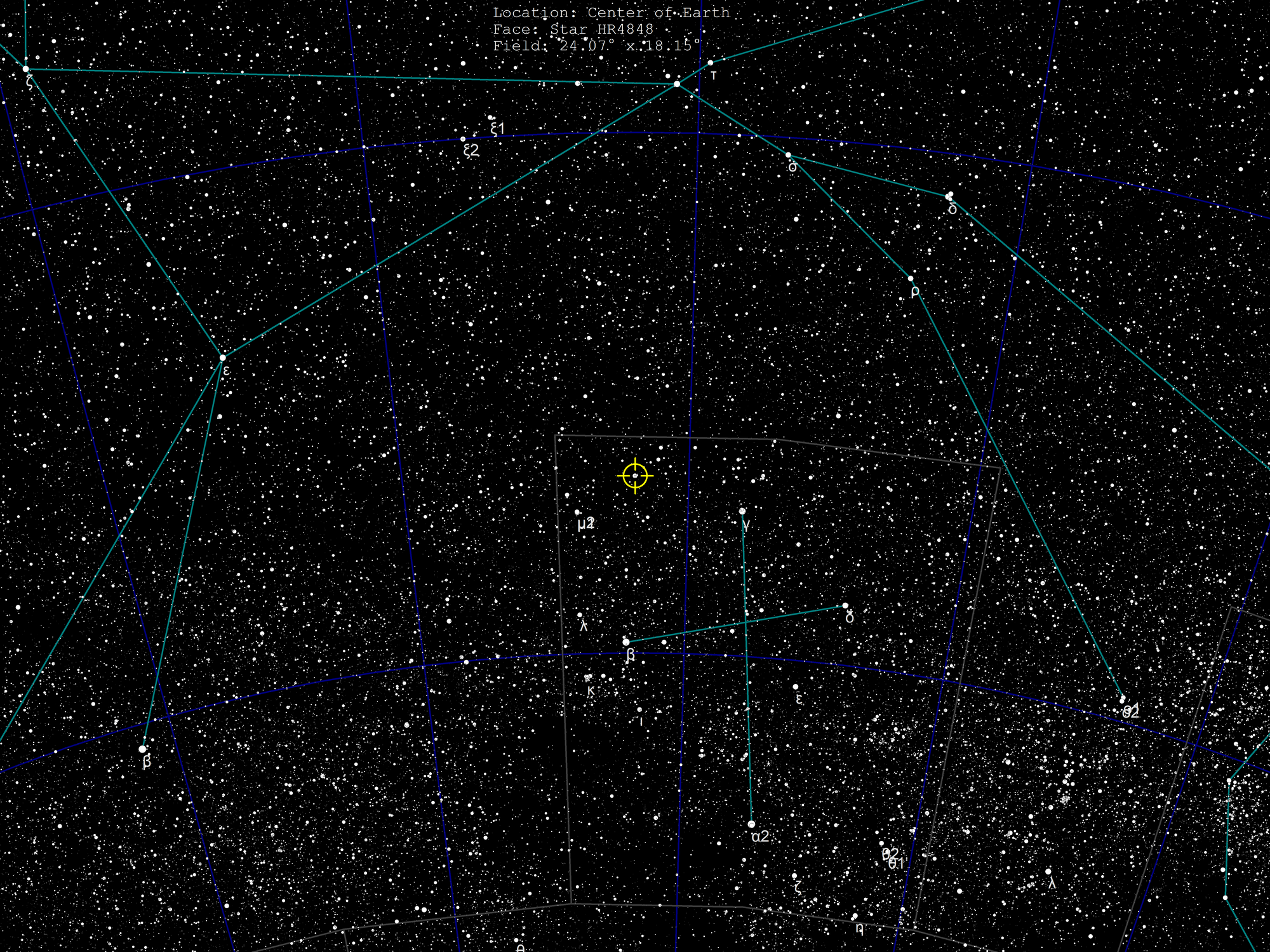
- Star map shows star position on the northern edge of the constellation Crux

Observation data Epoch J2000 Equinox J2000
- Constellation: Crux
- Right ascension: 12^{h} 46^{m} 22.71460^{s}
- Declination: −56° 29′ 19.7366″
- Apparent magnitude (V): 4.62

Characteristics
- Evolutionary stage: Main sequence
- Spectral type: B2/3V
- U−B color index: −0.61
- B−V color index: −0.150±0.003

Astrometry
Radial velocity (R_{v})	15.5 km/s
Proper motion (μ)	RA: −33.03 mas/yr Dec.: −14.84 mas/yr
Parallax (π)	8.48±0.22 mas
Distance	385 ± 10 ly (118 ± 3 pc)
Absolute magnitude (M_{V})	−1.05

Details
Mass	6.5 M_{☉}
Luminosity	1,538 L_{☉}
Surface gravity (log g)	4.24 cgs
Temperature	19,055 K
Rotational velocity (v sin i)	22±3 km/s
Age	12.7 Myr

Other designations
- CPD−55°5215, FK5 3018, HD 110956, HIP 62327, HR 4848, SAO 240235

Database references
SIMBAD	data

HD 110956 is a single star in the southern constellation of Crux. It is faintly visible to the naked eye with an apparent visual magnitude of 4.62. The distance to this star is approximately 385 light years based on parallax and it is drifting further away with a radial velocity of 15.5 km/s. It is a probable member of the Lower Centaurus–Crux subgroup of the Scorpius–Centaurus association.

This is a B-type main-sequence star with a stellar classification of B2/3V. It is a young star, estimated to be about 12.7 million years old, with 6.5 times the mass of the Sun. The star is spinning with a projected rotational velocity of 22 km/s. It is radiating around 1,500 times the luminosity of the Sun from its photosphere at an effective temperature of 19,055 K.

There are multiple visual companions positioned near HD 110956. The brightest of these, with a visual magnitude of 8.93, is located at an angular separation of 51.1″ along a position angle of 166°, as of 2020. This companion was reported by J. F. W. Herschel in 1834. It is an α^{2} CVn variable with the designation BR Cru.
