= SY Cancri =

Binary star in the constellation Cancer

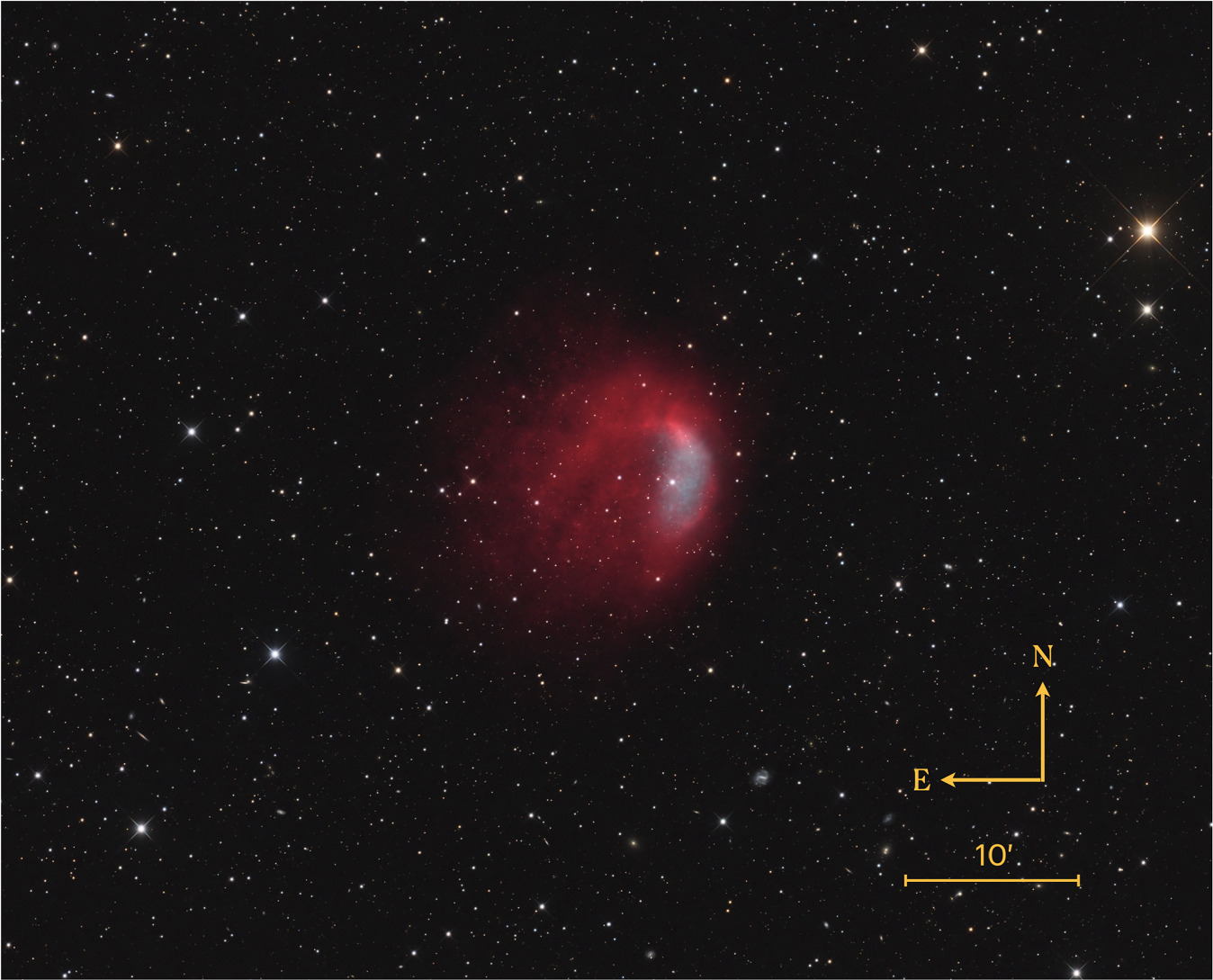
- Image of SY Cancri within PaEl 1 nebula

Observation data Epoch J2000.0 Equinox ICRS
- Constellation: Cancer
- Right ascension: 09^{h} 01^{m} 03.320^{s}
- Declination: +17° 53′ 56.03″
- Apparent magnitude (V): 10.5 - 14.5

Characteristics
- Evolutionary stage: White dwarf + Red dwarf
- Spectral type: WD + M0-V
- Variable type: U Gem

Astrometry
Proper motion (μ)	RA: −29.138 mas/yr Dec.: −6.423 mas/yr
Parallax (π)	2.461±0.0253 mas
Distance	1,330 ± 10 ly (406 ± 4 pc)

Orbit
Period (P)	9.17701 h
Periastron epoch (T)	2451300.254±0.002 HJD
Semi-amplitude (K_{2}) (secondary)	88.0±2.9 km/s

Details

Primary
Mass	0.77–1.54 M_{☉}

Secondary
Mass	0.65−1.31 M_{☉}

Other designations
- SY Cnc, AAVSO 0855+18, BD+18°2101, TIC 437056841

Database references
SIMBAD	data

SY Cancri (SY Cnc) is a binary star system located in the northern constellation of Cancer and is part of the Beehive Cluster. It is a cataclysmic variable (CV) of the Z Cam type and is the third brightest Z Cam star to be discovered. The system consists of a white dwarf primary accreting material from a low-mass secondary companion, exhibiting periodic outbursts due to instabilities in the accretion disk. The system is notable for its relatively infrequent "standstills", periods of stable intermediate brightness between normal and outbursts.

== Discovery and observations ==
The variability of this system was discovered by L. Ceraski, and was reported in 1929 by S. Blažko. Between 1912 and 1928, Ceraski found it varied in brightness from magnitude 9.5 and 12.5. A follow up study in 1931 by R. Prager reported the brightness ranging from magnitude 9.9 to below 12. In 1950, G. Herbig performed a spectroscopic study, finding a spectrum similar to the cataclysmic variable Z Camelopardalis. Multicolor photometry has been collected over decades, revealing patterns of outbursts and rapid flickering. In 2009, spectroscopic analysis suggested unstable mass transfer, with a high mass ratio for the system.

In 2024, a bow-shock nebula was discovered around SY Cnc through amateur imaging from the Southern Hα Sky Survey Atlas (SHASSA), marking it as only the second such feature known in a Z Cam dwarf nova.

== Nebula ==
SY Cnc is associated with a faint bow-shock nebula (PaEl 1), discovered in 2024, spanning ~3 arcminutes in diameter with bipolar, conical geometry. The nebula features a parabolic rim prominent in O III and Hα emission, formed by the system's supersonic wind (transverse velocity 56.8 ± 0.6 km/s) interacting with the interstellar medium. SY Cnc lies near the western edge of a larger ~30′ (~1.8 pc) Hα-emitting nebula, suggesting possible past nova ejecta (~7800 years ago) or photoionization by the CV. Another system with similar properties is V341 Arae.
