= NGC 1984 =

Open cluster in the constellation Dorado

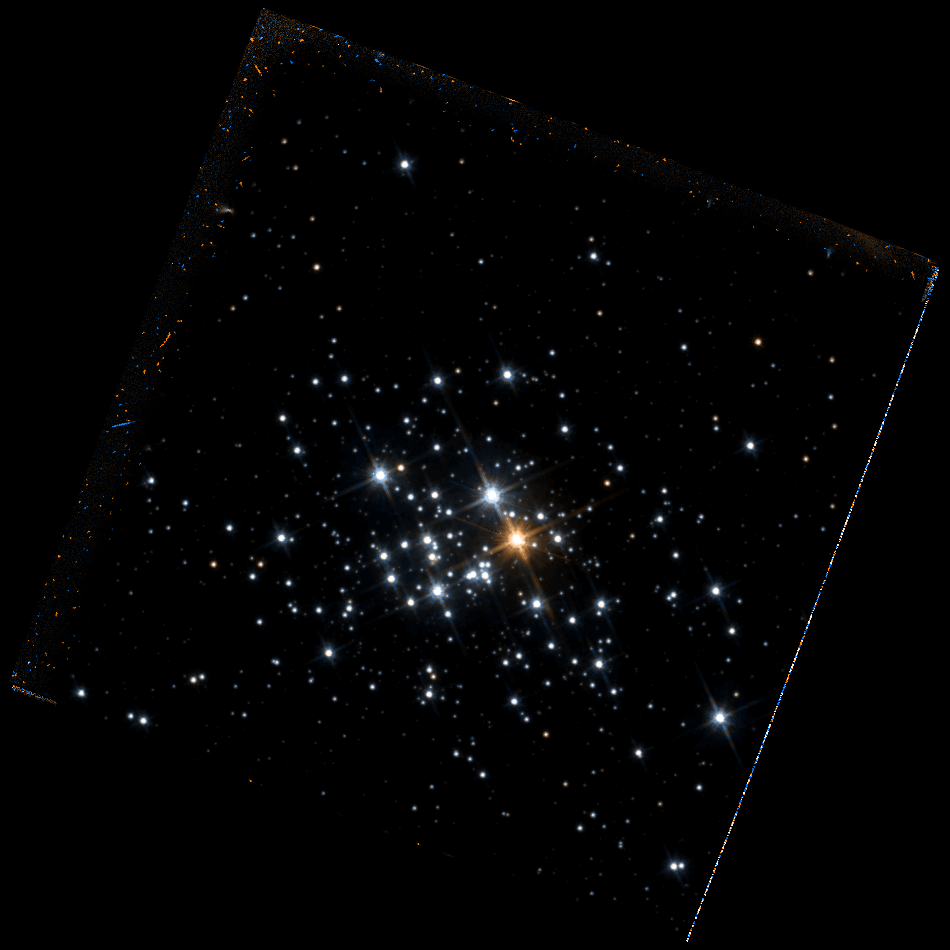
- The open cluster NGC 1984

Observation data (J2000.0 epoch)
- Right ascension: 05^{h} 27^{m} 40.9^{s}
- Declination: −69° 08′ 04″
- Apparent magnitude (V): 9.99
- Apparent dimensions (V): 1.50 x 1.20

Physical characteristics
- Other designations: ESO 56-SC132, GC 1187, h 2882

Associations
- Constellation: Dorado

NGC 1984 (also known as ESO 56-SC132) is an open cluster associated with an emission nebula, it is located in the constellation Dorado in the Large Magellanic Cloud. It was discovered by John Herschel on 16 December 1835. The apparent magnitude is 9.9 and its size is 1.50 by 1.20 arc minutes.

NGC 1984 contains a star called NGC 1984-16 which is at these co-ordinates 05 27 41.0 -69 08 06.

== See also ==
- List of NGC objects (1001–2000)
