= IRC −10414 =

Star in the constellation Scutum

Observation data Epoch J2000 Equinox ICRS
- Constellation: Scutum
- Right ascension: 18^{h} 23^{m} 17.90^{s}
- Declination: −13° 42′ 47.3″
- Apparent magnitude (V): 12.0

Characteristics
- Evolutionary stage: Red supergiant
- Spectral type: M7 I–M8
- Variable type: SR

Astrometry
Radial velocity (R_{v})	28.6 km/s
Proper motion (μ)	RA: 5.4 mas/yr Dec.: 1.6 mas/yr
Parallax (π)	0.497±0.038 mas
Distance	6,600 ± 500 ly (2,000 ± 200 pc)

Details
Radius	1,200 R_{☉}
Luminosity	160,000 L_{☉}
Surface gravity (log g)	−0.075 cgs
Temperature	3,110 - 3,300 K
Age	6 - 10 Myr

Other designations
- RAFGL 2139, IRAS 18204−1344, IRC −10414

Database references
SIMBAD	data

IRC −10414 (RAFGL 2139) is a red supergiant and runaway star in the constellation Scutum, a rare case of a red supergiant with a bow shock.

== Observations ==
Although IRC −10414 is an unobtrusive 12th magnitude star visually, early infrared observations quickly noted it as a bright source. Its position close to the galactic plane marked it as a potentially luminous object. Observations then detected OH emission from the star, again indicating a potentially luminous cool supergiant. Dusty circumstellar material was found around the star and it was assumed to be a highly evolved asymptotic giant branch (AGB) star. On the basis of this assumption, it was expected to be at about 700 parsecs from the sun.

There were suspicions that IRC −10414 might be a true supergiant star based on some spectral features. Based on a kinematic distance of 4,500 parsecs, they derived a very high luminosity of 400,000 L_{☉} for the star VLBI measurements of SiO masers around IRC −10414 gave a distance around 2,000 parsecs and confirmed the red supergiant nature.

== Description ==
IRC −10414 has a spectral type of M7 or M8, which is highly unusual for a supergiant. It is notable for being one of the very few bow shock-producing red supergiant stars, along with Betelgeuse and Mu Cephei. Unlike the other two, the bow shock is visible in visible light. Its stellar wind seems to be ionized by the stars of the cluster NGC 6611 and/or the nearby (in the sky) Wolf-Rayet star WR 114.

Its distance is not very well known, but it is estimated to be of the order of 2 kiloparsecs on the basis its parallax and closeness of this star to the open clusters and star formation regions NGC 6604, Eagle Nebula, and the Omega Nebula (the three sharing a similar distance to the Sun, of around 2 kiloparsecs too); the studies of the water masers that surround it suggest a higher distance, up to around 3 kiloparsecs. However, the birthplace of this star is not clear and its kinematics and age show its unlikely it had formed in any of the previous three star-forming regions mentioned.

Assuming the distance given above and a surface temperature of 3,300 K, IRC −10414 is 160,000 times brighter than the Sun and its diameter in the order of 1,200 times the solar one, which places this star among the largest known. Stellar evolution models suggest in that case an initial mass between 20 and 25 solar masses and an age between 6 and 10 million years.

== Variability ==
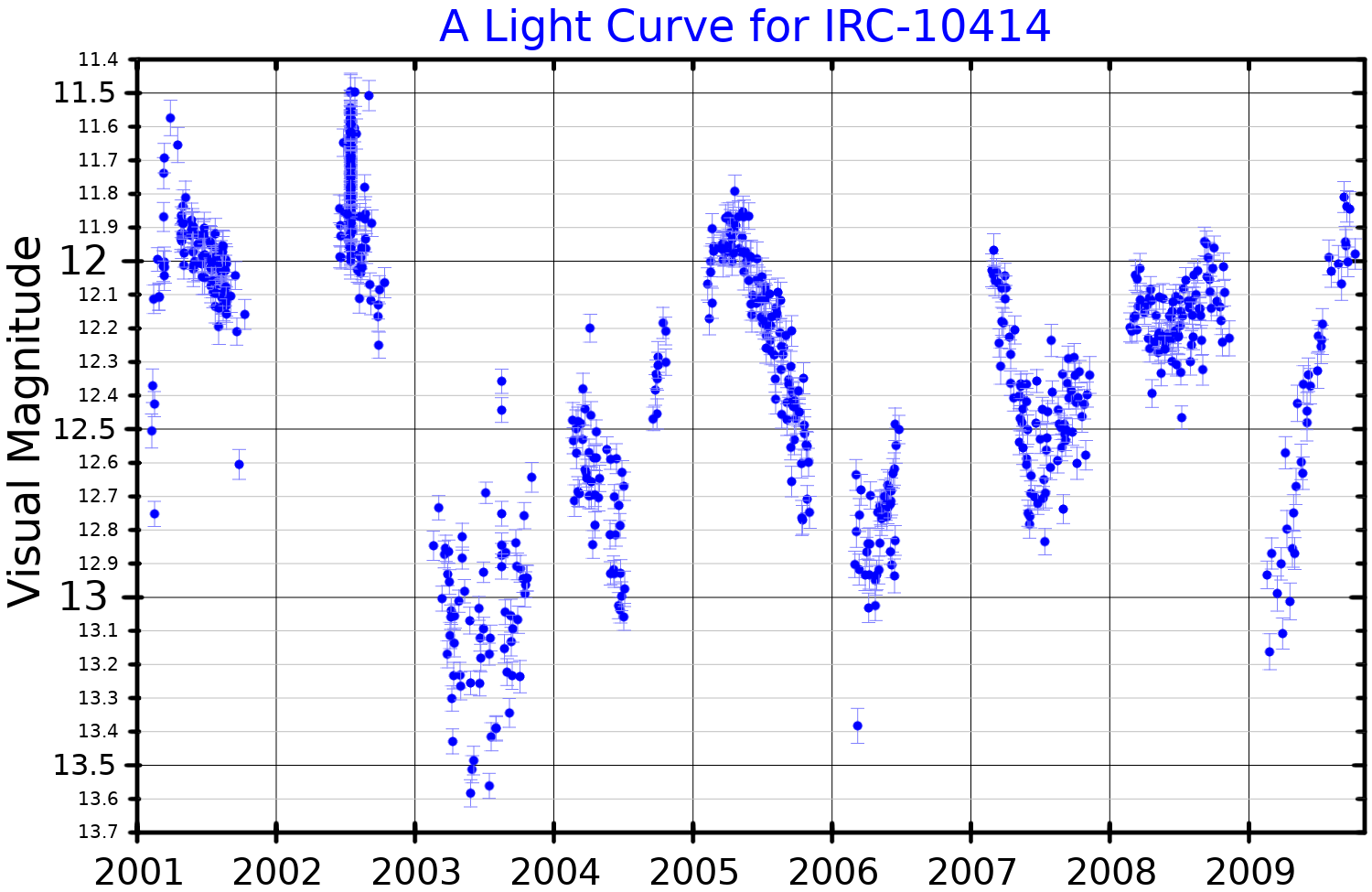
A visual band light curve for IRC −10414, plotted from ASAS data

IRC −10414 has been reported as a likely variable with a period of 768 days and an amplitude of over a magnitude. Observations of a long series of All Sky Automated Survey observations again showed variability with an amplitude over a magnitude, but with a period of 2,726 days. The variability is unlikely to be regular and the most likely classification is given as semiregular. It is not yet listed in the General Catalogue of Variable Stars.

== WR 114 ==
WR 114 (HD 169010) is a Wolf-Rayet star of spectral class WC5 located close in the sky (45 arc-seconds away) to IRC −10414. Its distance (2 kiloparsecs—6.500 light years—) is also similar.

The actual distance between the two stars is unclear. The projected separation corresponds to a separation of 0.43 parsecs at the expected distance. If it is as close as that then the strong stellar wind of the former would impede the formation of the bow shock by IRC −10414. It has been suggested both stars formed part of a dissolved triple star system moving more or less together. However the space motion of WR 114 are very poorly known so this cannot be confirmed.
