= HV 2112 =

Small Magellanic Cloud star in the constellation Tucana

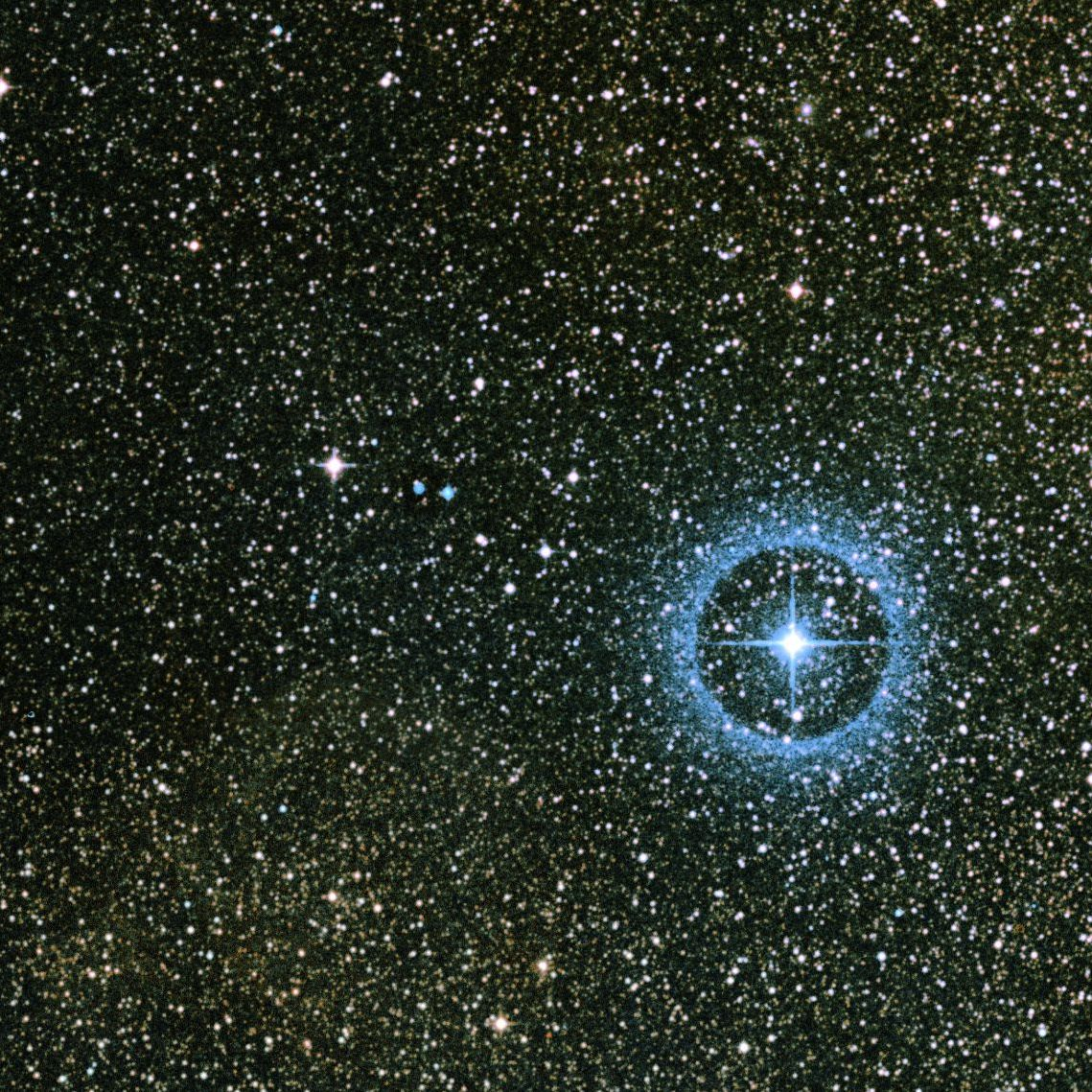
- HV 2112 (circled in red )

Observation data Epoch J2000.0 Equinox ICRS
- Constellation: Tucana
- Right ascension: 01^{h} 10^{m} 03.858^{s}
- Declination: −72° 36′ 52.62″
- Apparent magnitude (V): 12.7 to below 16.7

Characteristics
- Evolutionary stage: OH/IR AGB (SAGB?)
- Spectral type: M5.5 II (M3e – M7.5)
- Apparent magnitude (J): 10.020
- Apparent magnitude (H): 9.100
- Apparent magnitude (K): 8.723
- U−B color index: +0.33
- B−V color index: +1.80
- Variable type: Mira?

Astrometry
Radial velocity (R_{v})	157 km/s
Proper motion (μ)	RA: +1.038 mas/yr Dec.: −1.274 mas/yr
Parallax (π)	0.0164±0.0246 mas
Absolute magnitude (M_{V})	−5.2

Details
Mass	~5 M_{☉}
Radius	675 - 1,193 (Note: Calculated from effective temperature and luminosity figures, with reference to the nominal solar temperature of 5,772 K: $\sqrt{(5772/3750)^4 * 81,283} = 675.4\ R\odot$ $\sqrt{(5772/2500)^4 * 50,119} = 1,193.4\ R\odot$) R_{☉}
Luminosity	50,100 - 81,300 L_{☉}
Surface gravity (log g)	0.0 cgs
Temperature	2,500 - 3,750 K
Metallicity [Fe/H]	−2.18 dex

Other designations
- HV 2112, 2MASS J01100385-7236526, SMC V2156, PMMR 187

Database references
SIMBAD	data

HV 2112 is a cool luminous variable star in the Small Magellanic Cloud. Until 2018, it was considered to be the most likely candidate for a Thorne–Żytkow object, but it is now thought to be an asymptotic giant branch star and also a possible candidate for a super-AGB star.

== Discovery ==
HV 2112 was first reported as a variable star in 1908, by Henrietta Leavitt. At the time it was identified as Harvard no. 2112. No period was given, but it was reported to be "probably long". The magnitude range was given as 13.7 to fainter than 16.5, from photographic plates.

In 1966, analysis of Magellanic Cloud variable stars showed that HV 2112 had a photographic magnitude range from 13.0 to below 17.8. It was classified as a long-period variable, now known as a Mira variable, on the basis of its large amplitude and reasonably regular light variations, with a period of about 600 days.

== Possible object types ==
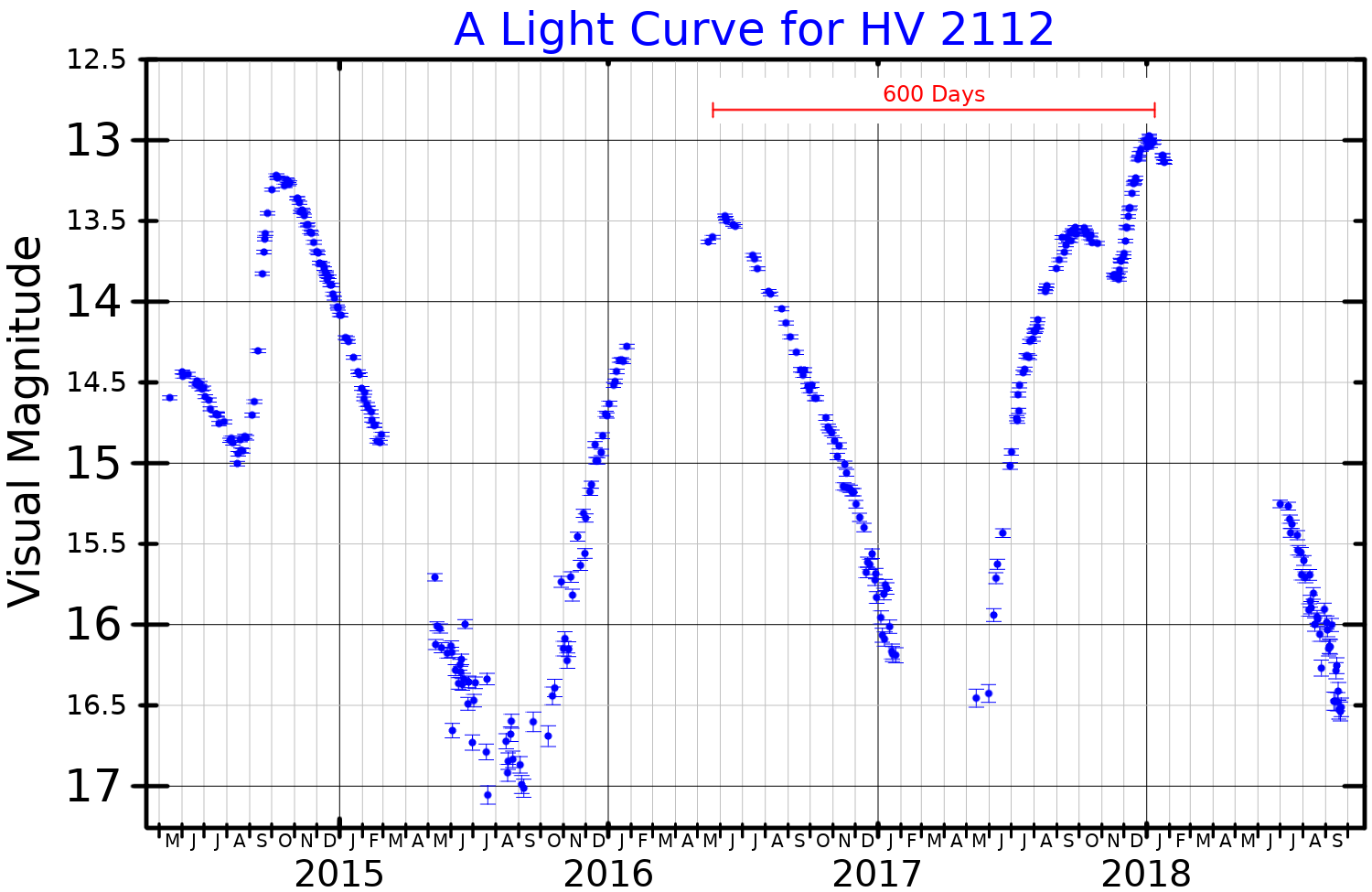
A visual band light curve for HV 2112, plotted from ASAS-SN data

=== AGB star ===
HV 2112 had historically been treated as a very luminous asymptotic giant branch (AGB) star, a red giant that has exhausted its core helium and is in the last stages of its evolution. Large-amplitude class-M variables and stars with spectral types later than about M5 are almost always AGB stars rather than red supergiants. These stars have a theoretical maximum luminosity and, at the distance of the SMC, HV 2112 was typically calculated to be slightly more luminous than this limit at around 60,000 L_{☉}.

More modern calculations gave higher values for the luminosity of HV 2112 above 100,000 L_{☉}, which is unambiguously too luminous to be an AGB star. These calculations included an interstellar extinction value of 0.4 magnitudes which is higher than average for massive stars in the SMC. However, it is not exceptional for red supergiants, which are believed to show additional extinction due to circumstellar dust near the star.

Analysis of the proper motion of HV 2112 in 2016 reported that it is unusually large for an SMC star, although the radial velocity is consistent with other SMC objects. The proper motion of around 10 mas/year would indicate a space velocity of 3,100 km/sec at the distance of the SMC, well above its escape velocity. A more likely explanation of such a proper motion would be that HV 2112 lies about 3,000 parsecs away in our own galaxy. It would then be around 1,000 L_{☉} rather than 100,000 L_{☉} and so a typical AGB star. The over-abundance of heavy elements would then be explained as pollution from an unseen companion, producing an extrinsic S-type star. Other analyses of the proper motion show much smaller velocities, consistent with an object in the SMC

=== Thorne–Żytkow object ===
In 2014, HV 2112 was identified as a possible Thorne–Żytkow object (TZO) using the Magellan Clay telescope in Chile. To find candidate TZOs, Emily Levesque used the Apache Point Observatory to examine 24 red supergiant stars in the Milky Way, and the Magellan Clay telescope to look at 16 in the Large Magellanic Cloud and 22 in the Small Magellanic Cloud. The star was thought to contain unusually high levels of the elements lithium, molybdenum and rubidium that are expected only to be produced by TZOs.

A 2018 paper re-appraising the properties of HV 2112 found no evidence for unusual chemical abundances and a luminosity that is lower than previously thought. This suggests that the star is unlikely to be a TZO, and is much more likely an intermediate mass AGB star.

=== Binary star ===
HV 2112 is listed in the OGLE catalogue as an unresolved multiple star. The proper motions and radial velocity are consistent with other SMC objects, while the parallax is negative but acceptably close to the expected value for such a distant object.

== See also ==
- List of largest stars
