= SN 2025pht =

Core-collapse supernova in spiral galaxy NGC 1637

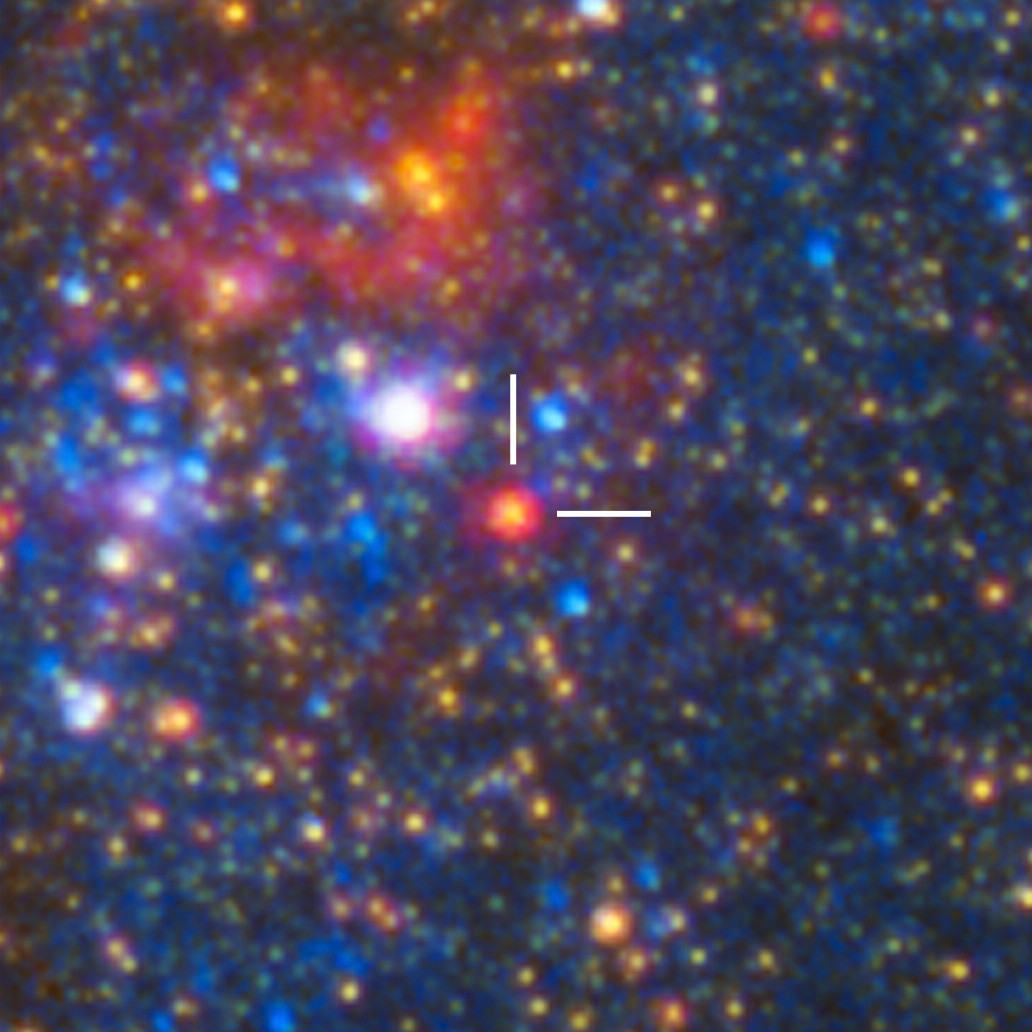
- SN 2025pht progenitor (red star) within NGC 1637 imaged by the Hubble and James Webb space telescopes
- Event type: Supernova
- II-P
- Date: 29 June 2025, 14:47:29
- Instrument: ASAS-SN
- Constellation: Eridanus
- Right ascension: 04^{h} 41^{m} 28.93^{s}
- Declination: −02° 51′ 56.2″
- Epoch: J2000
- Distance: 31.9 ± 5.9 Mly (9.8 ± 1.8 Mpc)
- Redshift: 0.002392
- Host: NGC 1637
- Progenitor: Red supergiant
- Peak apparent magnitude: +13.3
- Other designations: ASASSN-25cw, ATLAS25qmv, GOTO24ker, ZTF25abjlnnh, BGEM J044128.86-025155.6
- Related media on Commons

SN 2025pht (also known as ASASSN-25cw) was a Type II-P supernova that occurred in NGC 1637, a spiral galaxy located around 31.9 million light-years away in the constellation of Eridanus. Discovered on 29 June 2025 by the All Sky Automated Survey for SuperNovae (ASAS-SN), it reached a peak apparent magnitude of around +13.3 in the g-Sloan filter and was one of the brightest supernovae observed in 2025.

== Observation ==
Pre-explosion imaging of the site of SN 2025pht, combined with precise astrometric alignment Hubble Space Telescope observations from 31 July 2025, identified a single credible progenitor candidate. This source was detected in multiple epochs of HST imaging (including images from as early as 1994) and in JWST NIRCam and MIRI imaging from 2024, covering wavelengths from 0.8 μm to 8.7 μm. It represents the first JWST detection of a supernova progenitor and the longest-wavelength detection of such a star to date.

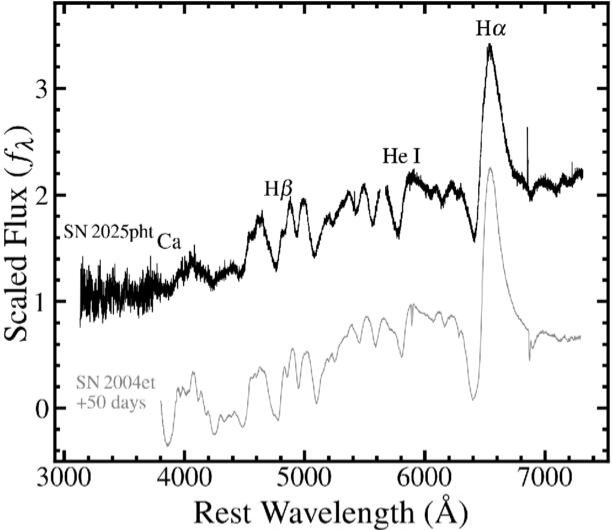
Comparison of spectrum of SN 2004et and SN 2025pht

Spectral energy distribution (SED) modeling indicates the progenitor was a red supergiant consistent with a Type II supernova progenitor. The star was heavily reddened by circumstellar dust, among the highest observed for such progenitors. Notably, the dust appears to be carbon-rich (graphite-rich) rather than silicate-rich, suggesting late-stage mass-loss episodes that dredged up carbon from the star's interior shortly before explosion. The progenitor was not prominently visible in optical HST images due to this dust but was clearly detected in infrared by the James Webb Space Telescope.

SN 2025pht has been compared to other events like SN 2023ixf and SN 2004et. SN 2025pht's progenitor was found to be potentially among the most luminous and dustiest identified, and SN 2025pht's spectrum closely matches the spectrum of SN 2004et.

== Gallery ==
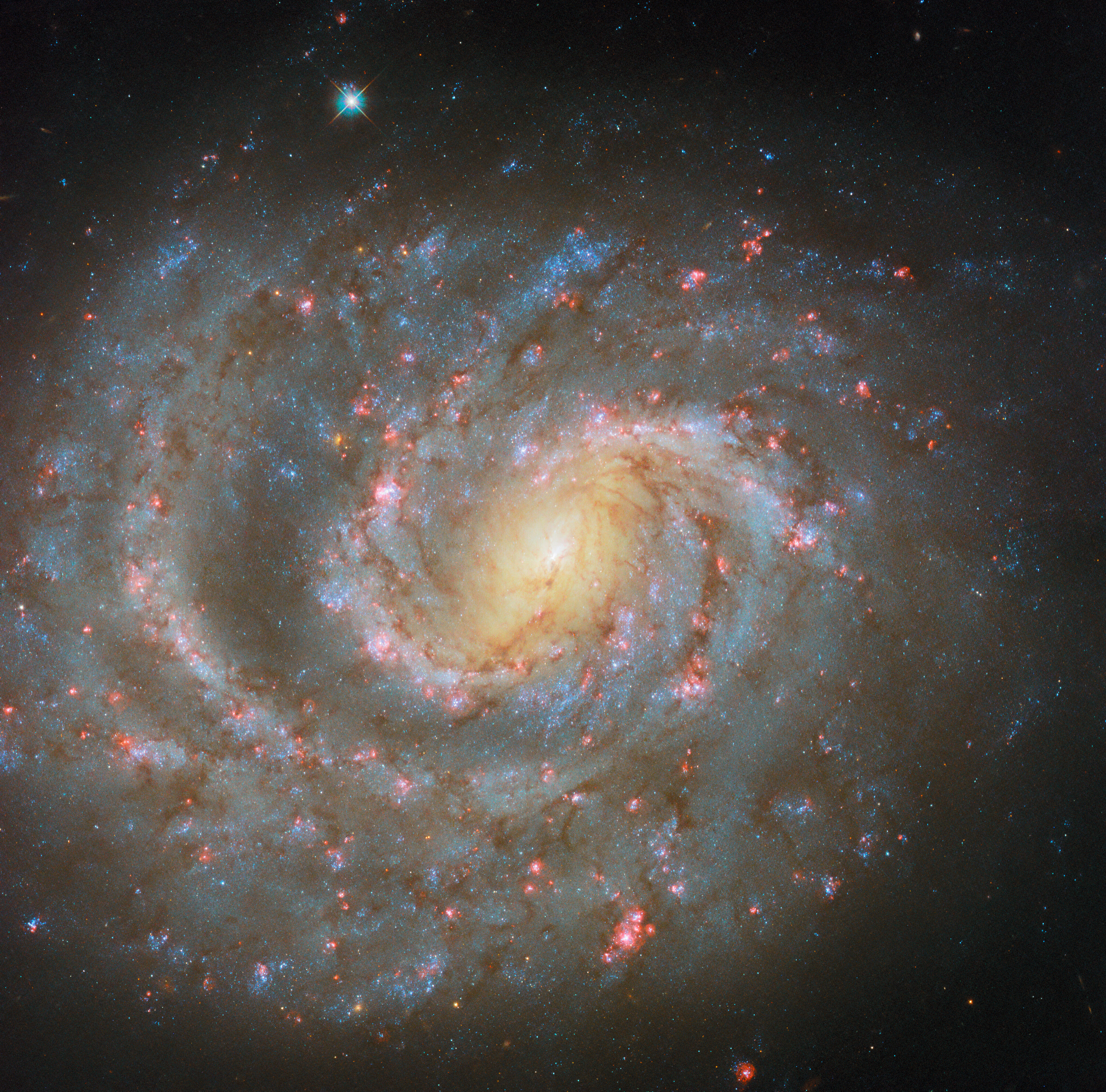
Image of the host galaxy from the Hubble Space Telescope

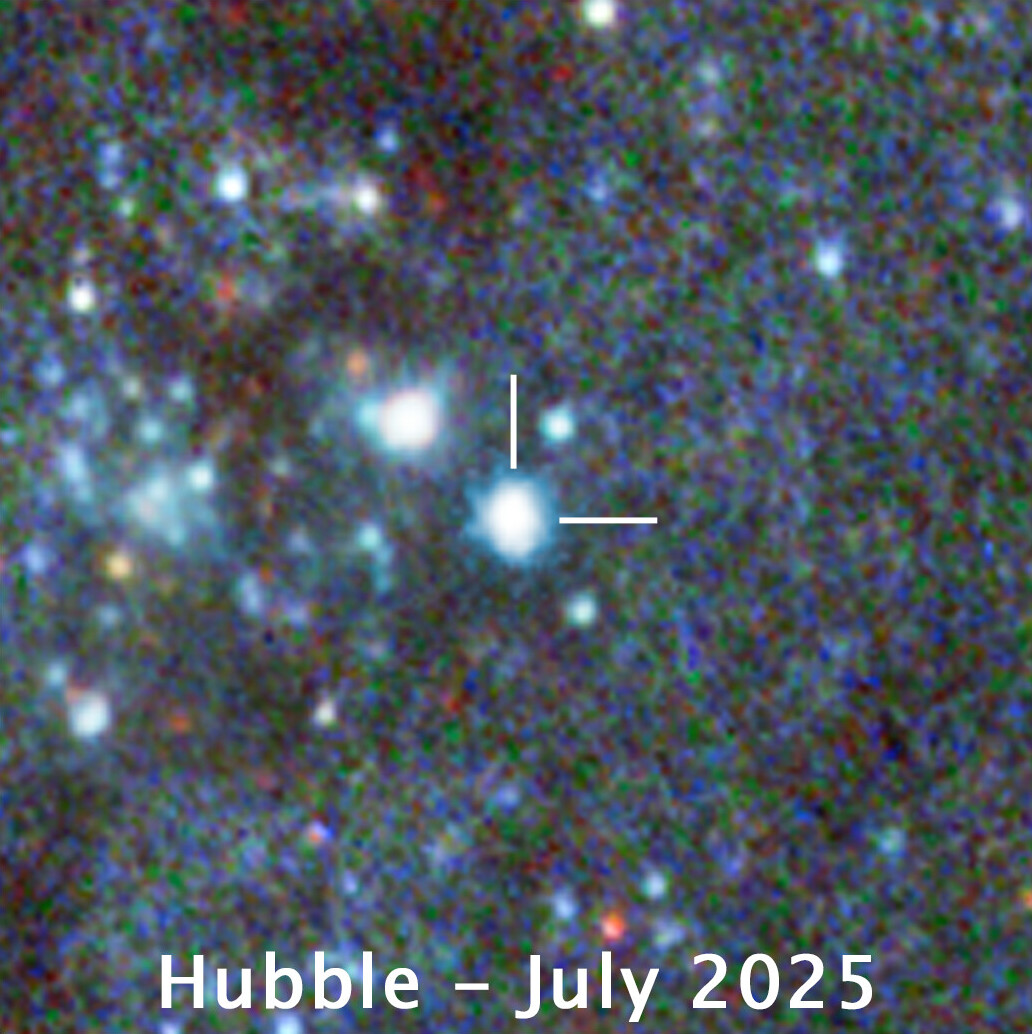
SN 2025pht and its progenitor imaged by Hubble Space Telescope

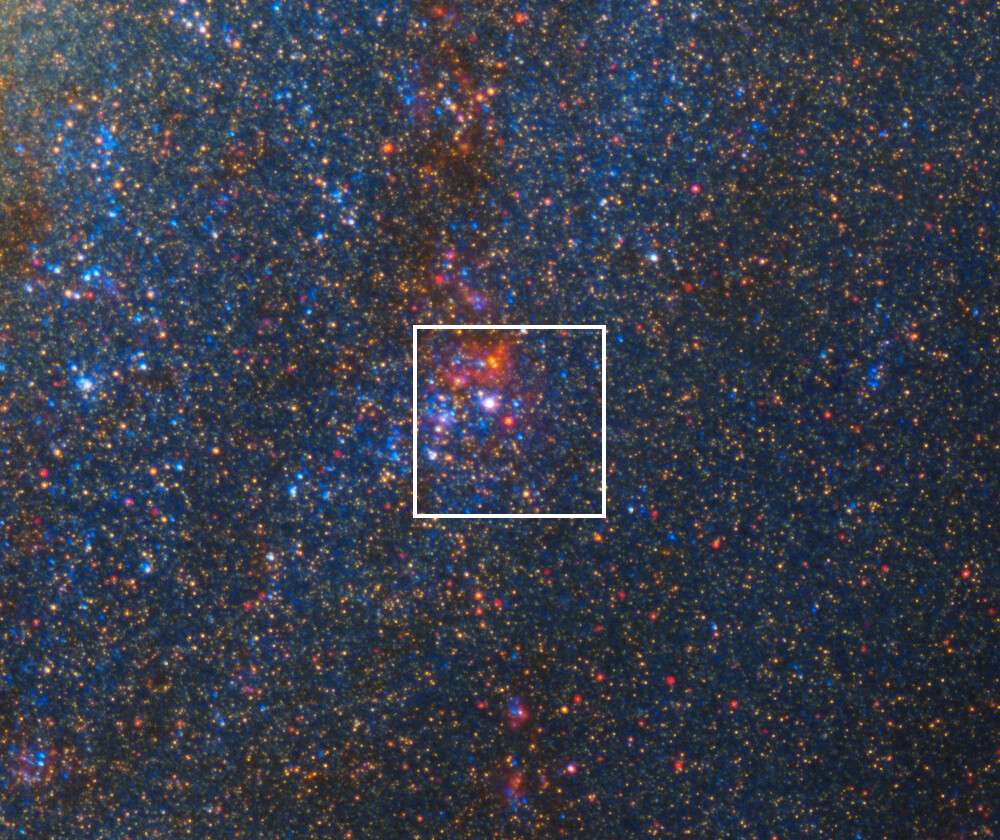
NGC 1637 imaged by Hubble and James Webb showing SN 2025pht and its progenitor
