= SN 1939C =

1939 supernova in galaxy NGC 6946

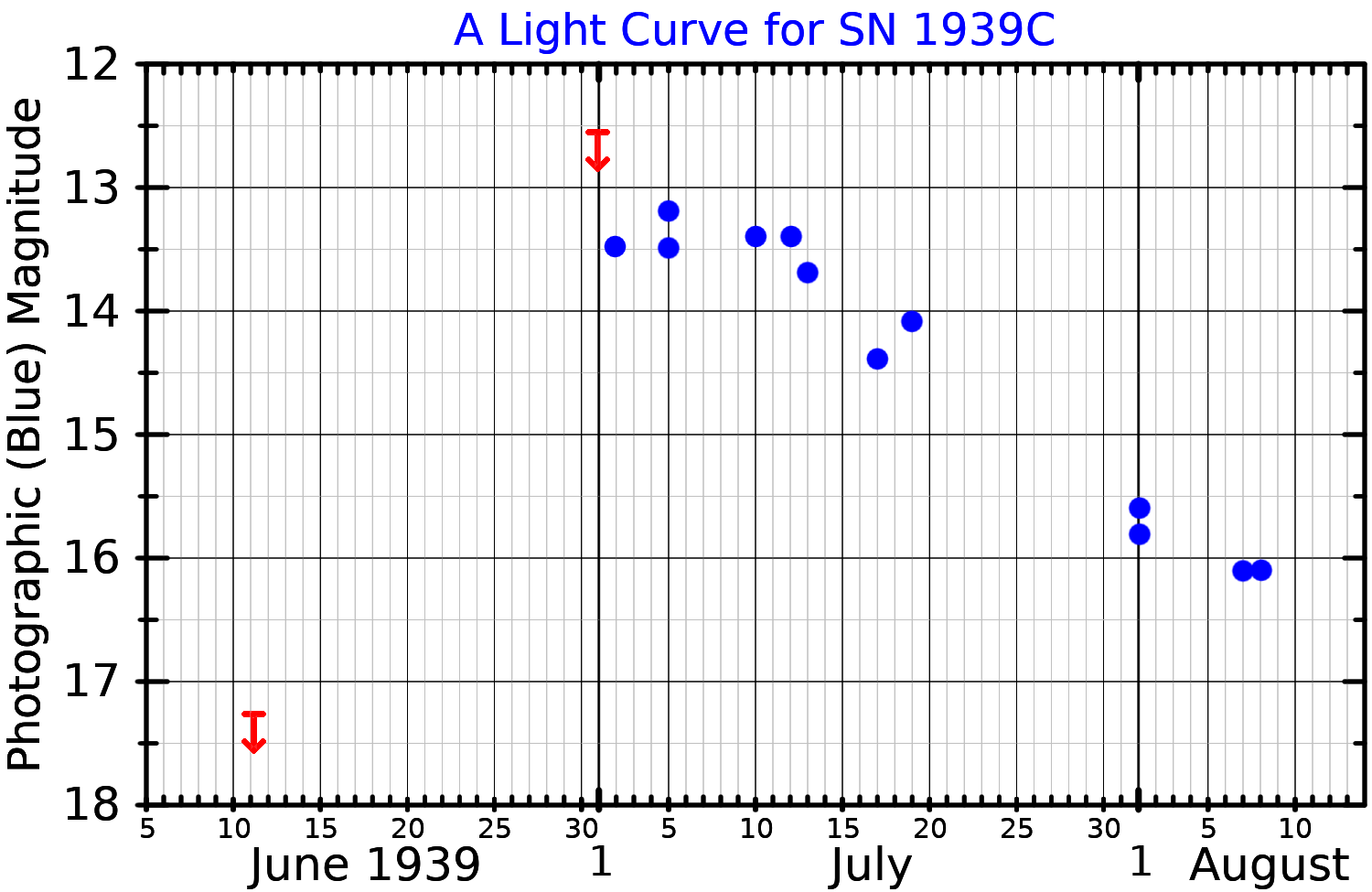
- A light curve for SN 1939C, adapted from Schaefer (1996). The red arrows show upper limits.
- Event type: Supernova
- SN.I
- Date: 17 July 1939
- Constellation: Cepheus
- Right ascension: 20:34:23.0
- Declination: +60:09:37.3
- Host: Fireworks Galaxy (NGC 6946)
- Peak apparent magnitude: 13.0
- Other designations: SN 1939C, 2MASS J20342405+6009299, GPM 308.600512+60.158384, Gaia DR2 2194501518284091008

SN 1939C was a supernova in the Fireworks Galaxy discovered by Fritz Zwicky on 17 July 1939. With a right ascension of 20:34:23.0 and a declination of +60:09:37.3, it was 215"W and 24"N away from the center of the Fireworks Galaxy. It was found at magnitude 14.4, after it had peaked, and was estimated to have been as bright as magnitude 13.
