= SN 1917A =

Supernova in the Fireworks Galaxy

- Event type: Supernova
- Type II
- Date: 19 July 1917
- Instrument: G. W. Ritchey
- Constellation: Cepheus
- Right ascension: 20^{h} 34^{m} 46.9^{s}
- Declination: +60° 07′ 29″
- Distance: 22 Mly (6.8 Mpc)
- Host: NGC 6946
- Peak apparent magnitude: 13.60
- Preceded by: SN 1916A
- Followed by: SN 1919A

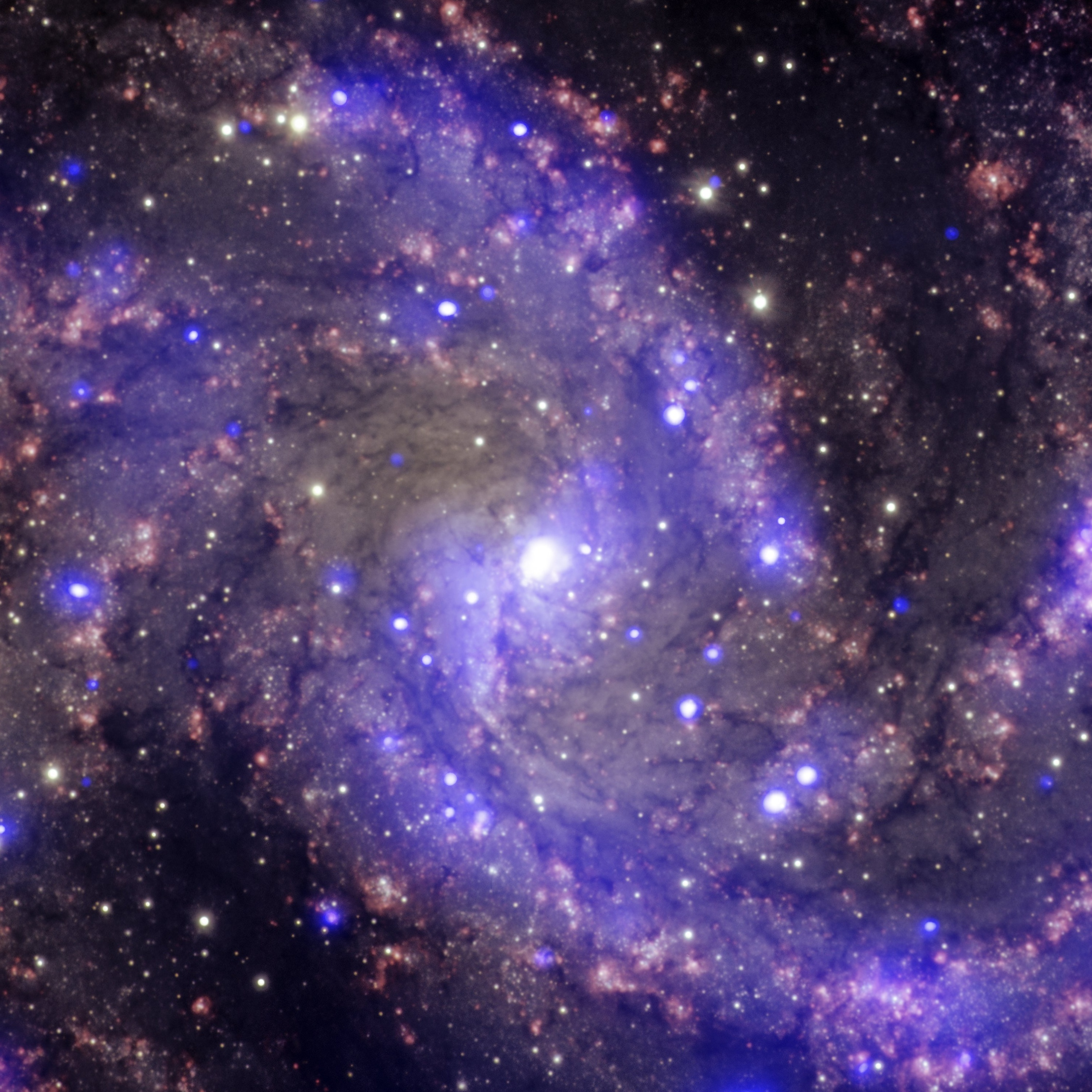
Fireworks Galaxy (NGC 6946) where SN 1917A occurred

SN 1917A is a supernova event in the Fireworks Galaxy (NGC 6946), positioned 37″ west and 105″ south of the galactic core. Discovered by American optician George Willis Ritchey on 19 July 1917, it reached a peak visual magnitude of 13.6. Based on a poor quality photographic spectrum taken at least a month after peak light by F. G. Pease and Ritchey, it was identified as a type II core-collapse supernova.

A 2018 analysis of the surrounding stellar population by B. F. Williams suggests the progenitor star was most likely 13^{+13}_{−1} million years old with 15^{+1}_{−5} times the mass of the Sun (M_{☉}). B. Koplitz and associates in 2021 inferred a progenitor mass estimate of 9.3+16.7
−0.7 M_{☉}. A 2020 search for light echoes from the supernova was unsuccessful.
