= NGC 1637 =

Galaxy in the constellation Eridanus

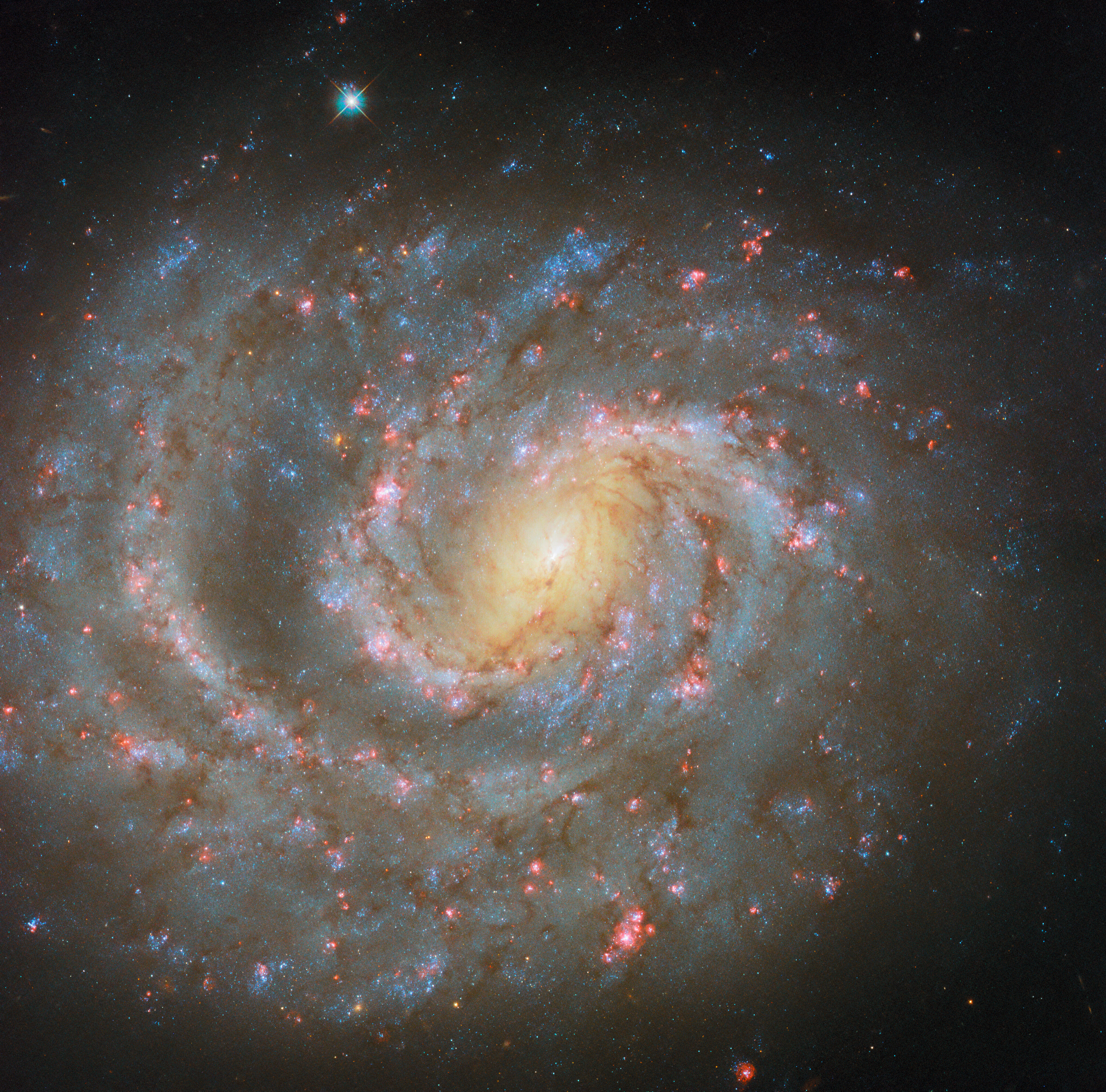
- NGC 1637 imaged by the Hubble Space Telescope

Observation data (J2000 epoch)
- Constellation: Eridanus
- Right ascension: 04^{h} 41^{m} 28.229^{s}
- Declination: −02° 51′ 28.94″
- Redshift: 0.00239
- Heliocentric radial velocity: 717.1±1.2 km/s
- Distance: 9.77 ± 1.82 Mpc (31.9 ± 5.9 Mly); 9.18 Mpc (29.9 Mly) h^{−1}_{0.73}
- Apparent magnitude (V): 11.5
- Apparent magnitude (B): 11.25

Characteristics
- Type: SAB(rs)c or SBc(s)II.3
- Size: ~57,000 ly (17.48 kpc) (estimated)
- Apparent size (V): 4.0′ × 3.2′

Other designations
- AGC 440323, IRAS 04389-0257, UGCA 93, MCG +00-12-068, PGC 15821, CGCG 393-066

NGC 1637 is an isolated, non-interacting intermediate spiral galaxy in the constellation Eridanus, about a degree to the WNW of the star Mu Eridani. It was discovered by German-British astronomer William Herschel on 1 February 1786. It is located at a distance of about 9.77 ± 1.82 Mpc (31.9 ± 5.9 Mly) from the Milky Way. The galaxy is inclined at an angle of 31.1° to the line of sight from the Earth and the long axis is oriented along a position angle of 16.3°.

In 1991, Gérard de Vaucouleurs and associates assigned a morphological classification of SAB(rs)c to NGC 1637, indicating a spiral galaxy with a weak bar structure (SAB) across the nucleus, surrounded by a partial ring (rs) and somewhat loosely-wound arms (c). While the inner section of the galaxy shows a symmetrical two-arm structure, it has a single outer spiral arm that wraps 180° around the nucleus, giving the galaxy an overall asymmetric, lopsided appearance. The outer spiral arm has a red component that indicates a significant age. However, the existence of this structure is difficult to explain. The galaxy shows indications of recent starburst activity that may have terminated around 15 million years ago.

The active central nucleus shows weak LINER behavior, and it may be an intermediate form between a LINER and an H II region. The luminosity of the X-ray source at the nucleus is 1.2×10^{38} ergs s^{−1} in the 0.3–7 keV band.

== Supernovae ==
Two supernovae have been observed in NGC 1637:

- SN 1999em (Type II-P, mag. 13.5) was discovered by the Lick Observatory Supernova Search (LOSS) on 29 October 1999, at an angular separation of 24″ to the southwest of the galaxy center. It was the brightest supernova discovered that year, reaching magnitude 13.1. The location corresponds to a deprojected galactocentric separation of 1.3 kpc (4.2 kly).
- SN 2025pht (Type II-P, mag. 13.3) was discovered by All Sky Automated Survey for SuperNovae on 29 June 2025. A study of archival images taken with the Hubble Space Telescope and the James Webb Space Telescope found a suspected progenitor, a red supergiant star with a mass of ~15M_{☉}.

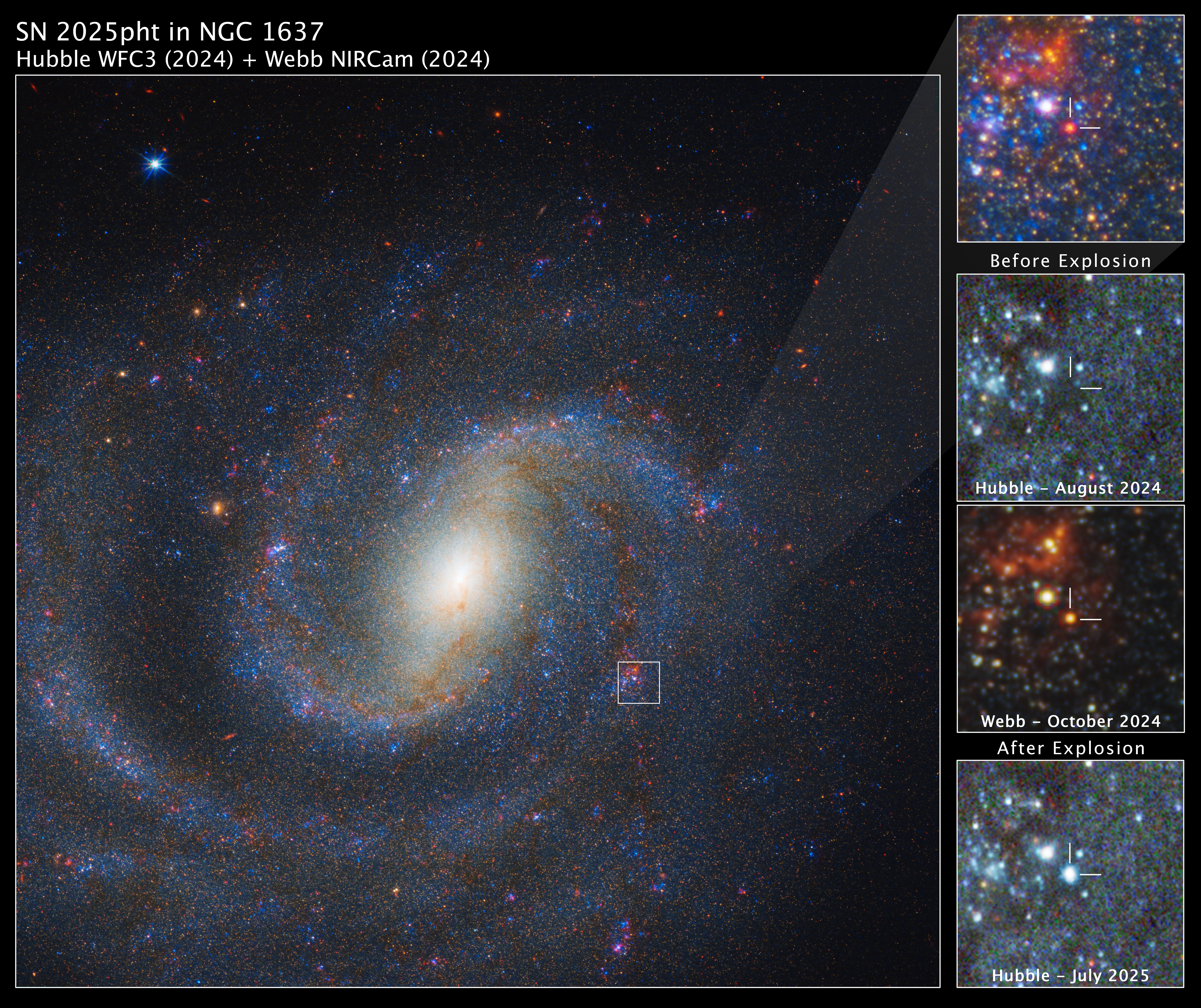
NGC 1637 showing SN 2025pht and its progenitor

== Image and Video Gallery ==
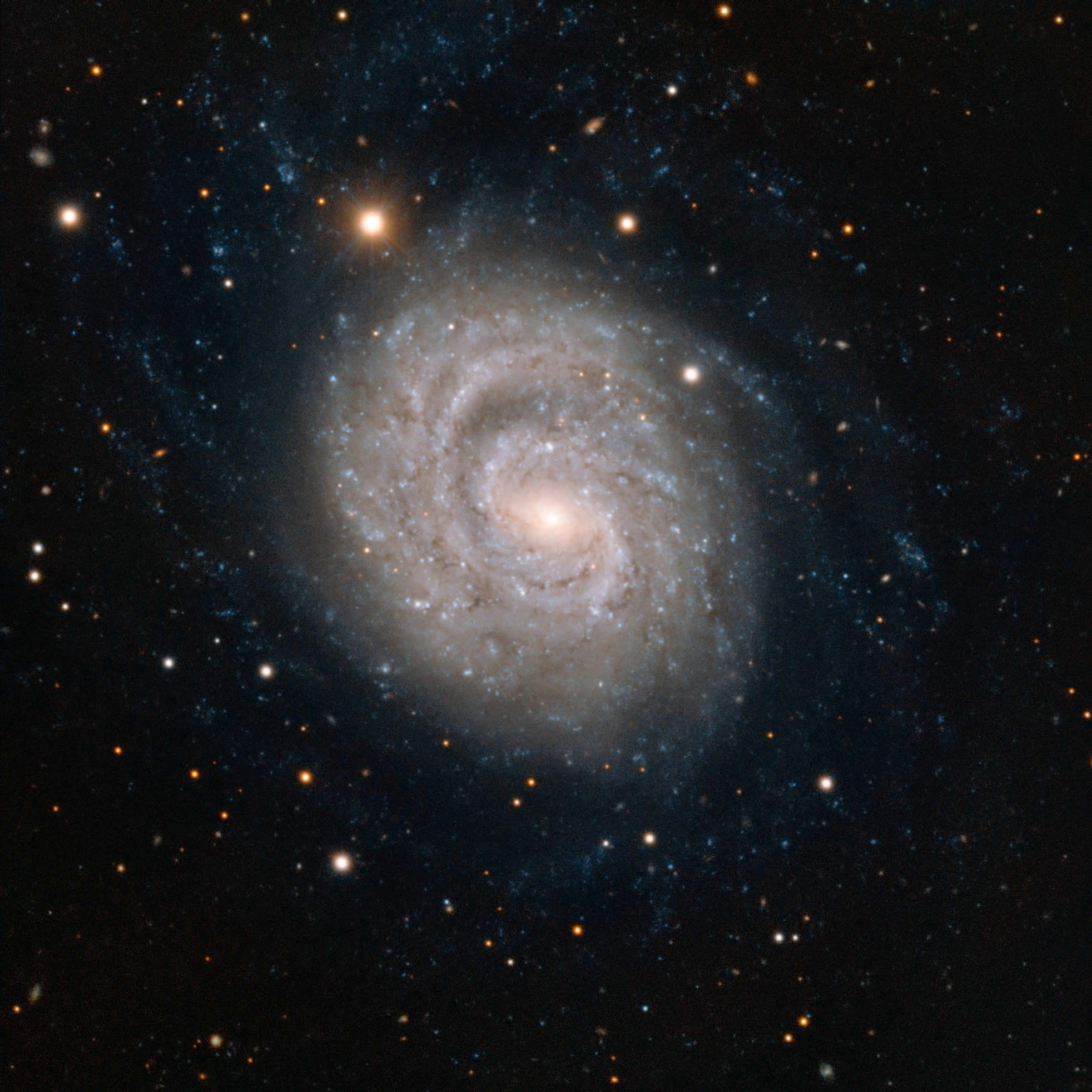
NGC 1637 imaged by the Very Large Telescope

Video showing the location of NGC 1637

== See also ==
- List of NGC objects (1001–2000)
