= SN 1999em =

Supernova event of October 1999 in the galaxy NGC 1637

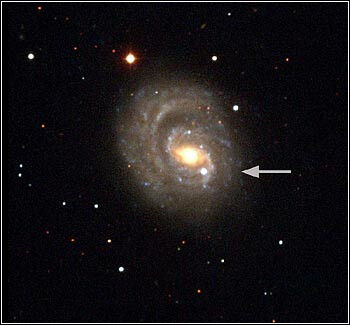
- Event type: Supernova
- Type II-P
- Instrument: Katzman Automatic Imaging Telescope
- Constellation: Eridanus
- Right ascension: 04^{h} 41^{m} 27.04^{s}
- Declination: −02° 51′ 45.2″
- Epoch: J2000
- Distance: 38.2 ± 3.0 million light-years (11.71 ± 0.92 Mpc).
- Host: NGC 1637
- Related media on Commons

SN 1999em was a well-observed Type II-P supernova in the spiral galaxy NGC 1637, which lies within the mostly southern constellation of Eridanus. It was discovered on October 29, 1999 at a visual magnitude of 13.3. Using a corrected version of the expanding photosphere method (EPM), the distance to the supernova is estimated as 37.5 ± 3.3 million light-years (11.5 ± 1 Mpc). This is in good agreement with the Cepheid method, which yields a distance of 38.2 ± 3.0 million light-years (11.71 ± 0.92 Mpc).

== Observations ==
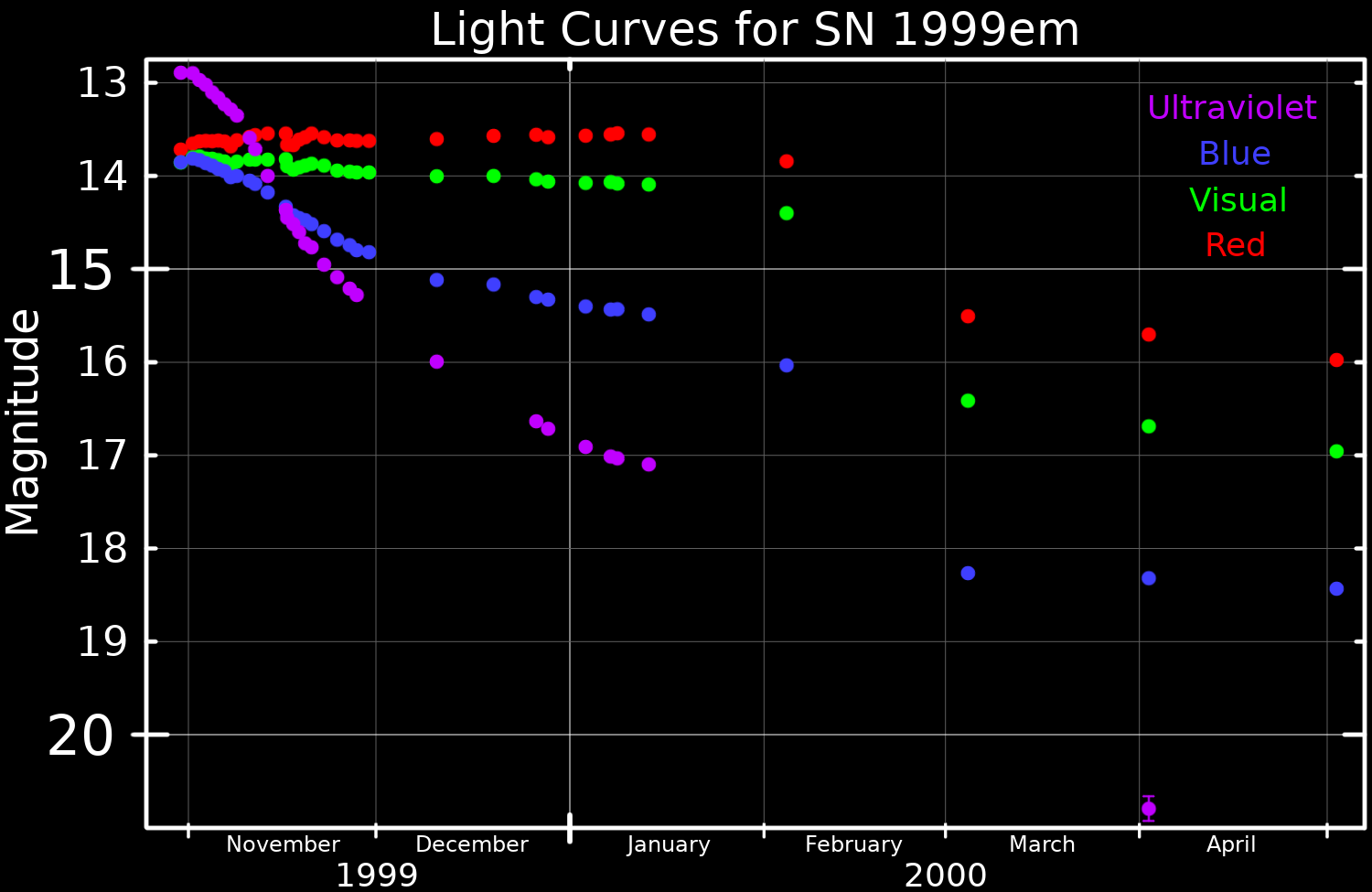
Light curves in four photometric bands, plotted from data published by Galbany et al. (2016)

This supernova event was first detected by the Lick Observatory Supernova Search from a CCD frame taken October 29, 1999 with the Katzman Automatic Imaging Telescope (KAIT). The discovery was confirmed by the Beijing Astronomical Observatory the same day. It showed an apparent visual magnitude of 13.5. A KAIT image of the same area taken October 20th showed nothing at the position of this supernova. SN 1999em was positioned 15.4″ west and 17.0″ south of the NGC 1637 nucleus. A spectrum taken October 30 showed this to be a Type II supernova event. The early expansion velocity of the photosphere was measured at 10,300 km/s. Interstellar lines in the spectrum indicated the event may be partially obscured by dust.

X-ray emission was detected from this source on November 1–2 and 11–12 using the Chandra X-ray Observatory. The number of photons detected suggested a luminosity of 1×10^{38} erg/s for the source. A compact radio source at this position was detected on December 1 from the NRAO Very Large Array. This was the first Type II-P supernova to be detected at both X-ray and radio wavelengths. By now the target was identified as a Type II-P supernova, based on the shape of the light curves and spectral properties. Spectrapolarimetry measured between November 1999 and January 2000 showed an increasing level of polarization at later dates. This implied asphericity toward the core of the explosion – meaning a deviation from spherical symmetry.

Photometric observations showed that SN 1999em remained in its plateau phase for approximately 90 days, indicating that the progenitor possessed a massive hydrogen envelope when the explosion occurred. The explosion date was estimated to be 5.3±1.4 d before discovery. By day 161, the spectrum was dominated by emission lines, indicating that the remnant was transitioning to the nebular phase. Evidence showed that dust formation began at around day 500. The exponential decay rate of the light curve tail was mainly powered by the radioactive decay of ^{56}Co to ^{56}Fe. Ejecta mass is estimated at approximately 10 to 11 M_{☉} and the surviving neutron star has 1.5 M_{☉}.

The host galaxy is close enough that individual bright supergiants can be resolved. However, no such object was detected at the position of the event. Supernova models indicate a progenitor mass in the range of 11 to 13 M_{☉}, with near solar metallicity and an explosive energy of 1.2 foe. This star had a radius of about 120 to 150 R_{☉}. Radio and X-ray emission indicate the progenitor was surrounded by clumpy or filamentary circumstellar material that was fed by a low stellar mass loss rate of about 2×10^{−4} M_{☉}·yr^{−1} with a wind velocity of 10 km/s. The light curve for this event is nearly identical to that of SN 1999gi, suggesting they may have similar progenitor stars.
