= NGC 6946 =

Galaxy in the constellations Cepheus & Cygnus

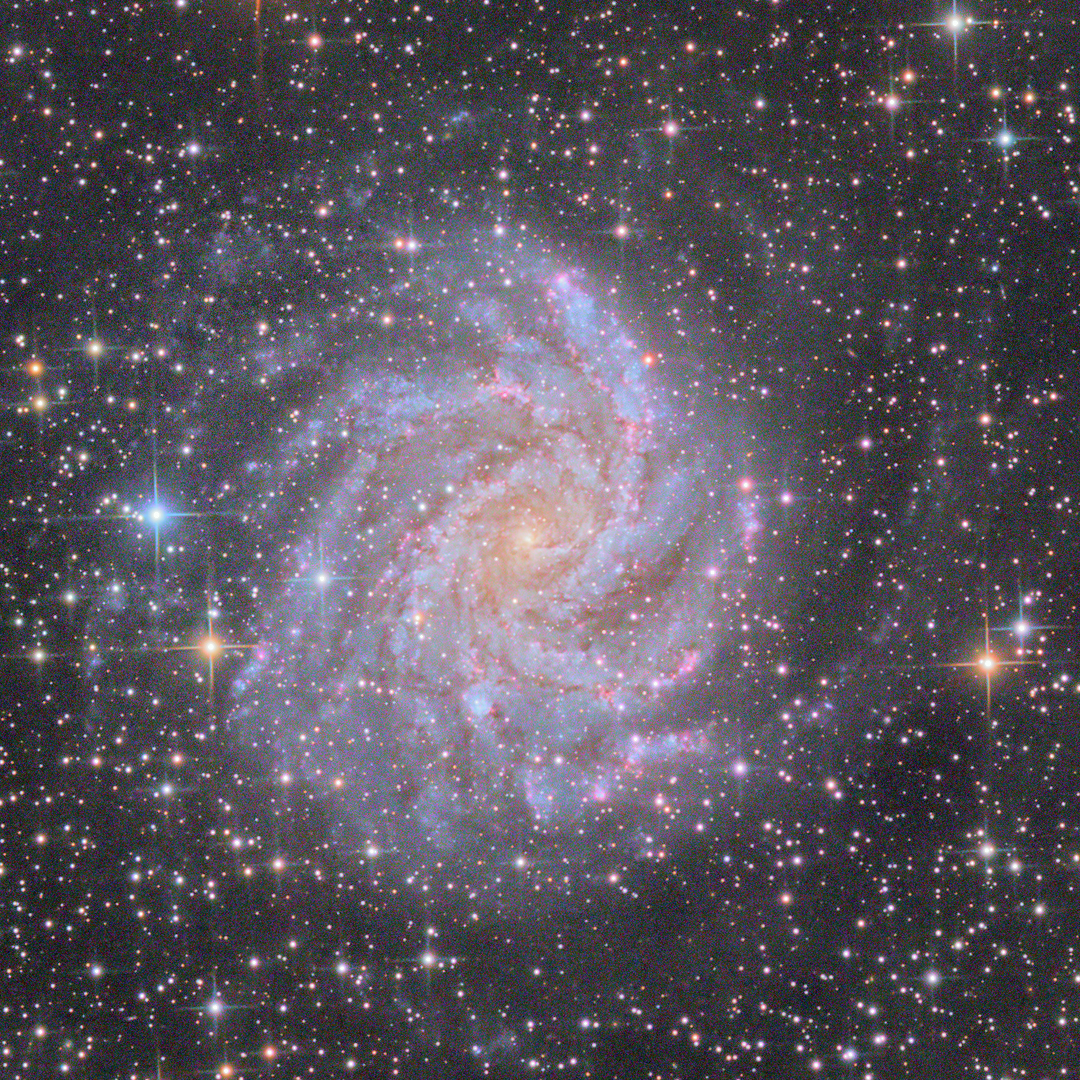
- An image of NGC 6946, the fireworks galaxy

Observation data (J2000 epoch)
- Constellation: Cepheus and Cygnus
- Right ascension: 20^{h} 34^{m} 52.3^{s}
- Declination: +60° 09′ 14″
- Redshift: 0.000133
- Heliocentric radial velocity: 48 ± 2 km/s
- Distance: 25.2 ± 1.0 Mly; 7.72± 0.32 Mpc)
- Apparent magnitude (V): +9.6

Characteristics
- Type: SAB(rs)cd
- Size: 26.77 kpc (87,300 ly) (diameter; 25.0 mag/arcsec^{2} B-band isophote)
- Apparent size (V): 16.0 x 11.2 arcmin

Other designations
- UGC 11597, PGC 65001, Arp 29, Caldwell 12

NGC 6946, sometimes referred to as the Fireworks Galaxy, is a grand design, face-on intermediate spiral galaxy with a small bright nucleus, whose location in the sky straddles the boundary between the northern constellations of Cepheus and Cygnus. Its distance from Earth is about 25.2 million light-years or 7.72 megaparsecs, similar to the distance of M101 (NGC 5457) in the constellation Ursa Major. Both were once considered to be part of the Local Group, but are now known to be among the dozen bright spiral galaxies near the Milky Way but beyond the confines of the Local Group. NGC 6946 lies within the Virgo Supercluster.

The galaxy was discovered by German-British astronomer William Herschel on 9 September 1798. Based on an estimation by the Third Reference Catalogue of Bright Galaxies (RC3) in 1991, the galaxy has a D_{25} B-band isophotal diameter of 26.77 kiloparsecs (87,300 light-years). It is heavily obscured by interstellar matter due to its location close to the galactic plane of the Milky Way. Due to its prodigious star formation it has been classified as an active starburst galaxy. NGC 6946 has also been classified as a double-barred spiral galaxy, with the inner, smaller bar presumably responsible for funneling gas into its center.

Various unusual celestial objects have been observed within NGC 6946. This includes the so-called 'Red Ellipse' along one of the northern arms that looks like a super-bubble or very large supernova remnant, and which may have been formed by an open cluster containing massive stars. There are also two regions of unusual dark lanes of nebulosity, while within the spiral arms several regions appear devoid of stars and gaseous hydrogen, some spanning up to two kiloparsecs across. A third peculiar object, discovered in 1967, is now known as "Hodge's Complex". This was once thought to be a young supergiant cluster, but in 2017 it was conjectured to be an interacting dwarf galaxy superimposed on NGC 6946.

== Supernovae ==
Ten supernovae have been observed in NGC 6946 since 1917. For this reason, NGC 6946 has sometimes been referred to as the "Fireworks Galaxy". This is about ten times the rate observed in our Milky Way galaxy, even though the Milky Way has twice as many stars as NGC 6946.

- SN 1917A (type unknown, mag. 14) was discovered by American optician George Willis Ritchey on 19 July 1917.
- SN 1939C (type unknown, mag. 14.4) was discovered by Fritz Zwicky on 17 July 1939.
- SN 1948B (Type II, mag. 14.9) was discovered by Nicholas U. Mayall on 6 July 1948.
- SN 1968D (Type II, mag. 13.5) was discovered by Paul Wild and Justus R. Dunlap on 29 February 1968. A prediscovery photograph was also found which showed the supernova on 6 February with a magnitude of 13.5.
- SN 1969P (type unknown, mag. 13.9) was discovered by Leonida Rosino on 11 December 1969.
- SN 1980K (Type II-L, mag. 13) was discovered by Paul Wild on 28 October 1980.
- SN 2002hh (Type II, mag. 16.5) was discovered by LOTOSS (Lick Observatory and Tenagra Observatory Supernova Searches) on 31 October 2002.
- SN 2004et (Type II-P, mag. 12.8) was discovered by S. Moretti on 27 September 2004. Images taken during the preceding days revealed that the supernova explosion occurred on 22 September. The progenitor of the supernova was identified on earlier images –– only the seventh time that such an event was directly identified with its host star. The red supergiant progenitor had an initial mass of about 15M_{☉} in an interacting binary system shared with a blue supergiant.
- SN 2008S (Type IIn-pec/LBV, mag. 17.6) was discovered by Ron Arbour on 1 February 2008.
- SN 2017eaw (Type II-P, mag. 12.8) was discovered by Patrick Wiggins on 14 May 2017. It was detected in the northwest region of the galaxy, and light curves obtained over the next 600 days showed that it was a Type II-P. The progenitor was determined to have been a red supergiant, with a mass of around 15M_{☉}.

During 2009, a bright star within NGC 6946 flared up over several months to become over one million times as bright as the Sun. Shortly thereafter it faded rapidly. Observations with the Hubble Space Telescope suggest that the star did not survive, although there remains some infrared emission from its position. This is thought to come from debris falling onto a black hole that formed when the star died. This potential black hole-forming star is designated N6946-BH1. The progenitor is believed to have been a yellow hypergiant star.

As of 2017, more supernovae had been seen in NGC 6946 than in any other galaxy, a record that has since been surpassed by NGC 3690.

Supernovae in NGC 6946
Designation	Discovery magnitude	Type
1917A	14	II
1939C	14.4	?
1948B	14.9	II
1968D	13.5	II
1969P	13.9	?
1980K	13	II-L
2002hh	16.5	II
2004et	12.8	II
2008S	17.6	IIn-pec/LBV
2017eaw	12.8	II-P

== Nova images ==
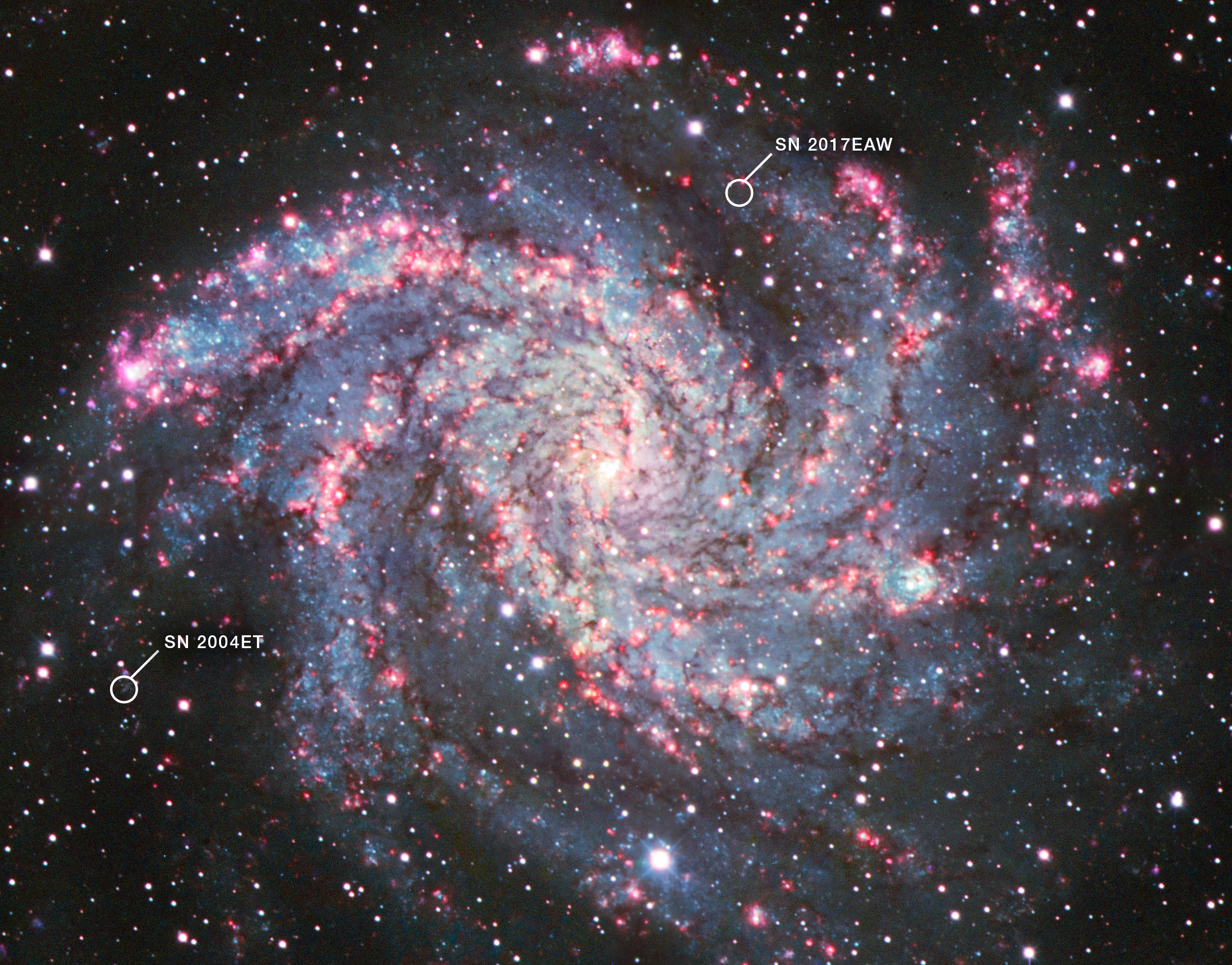
This image from the Kitt Peak National Observatory contextualizes the locations of supernovae 2004et and 2017eaw within the galaxy.

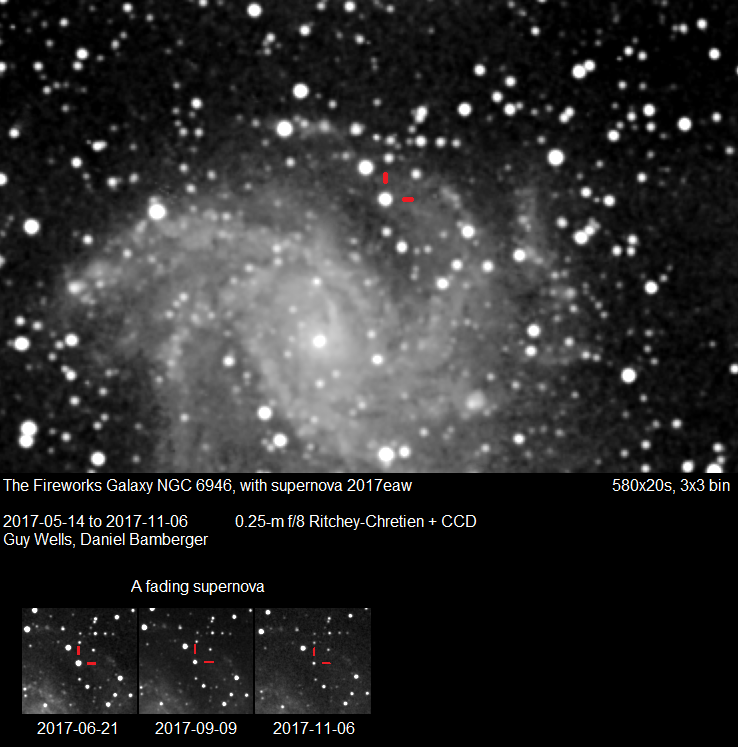
Images of 2017eaw in NGC 6946, taken between May and November 2017, as the supernova was slowly fading

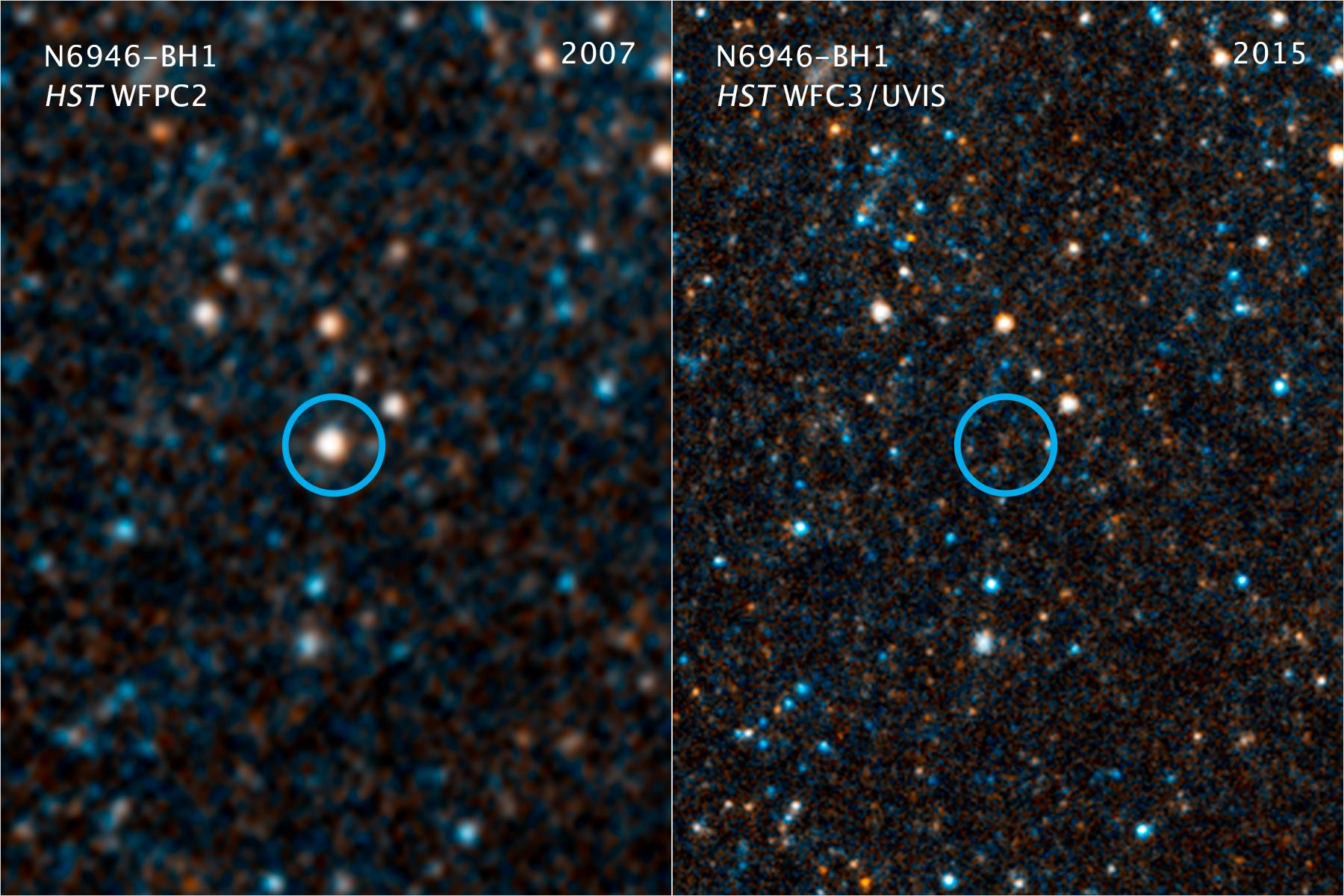
Pair of visible-light and near-infrared photos from the Hubble Space Telescope showing the giant star N6946-BH1 before and after it vanished out of sight by imploding to form a black hole

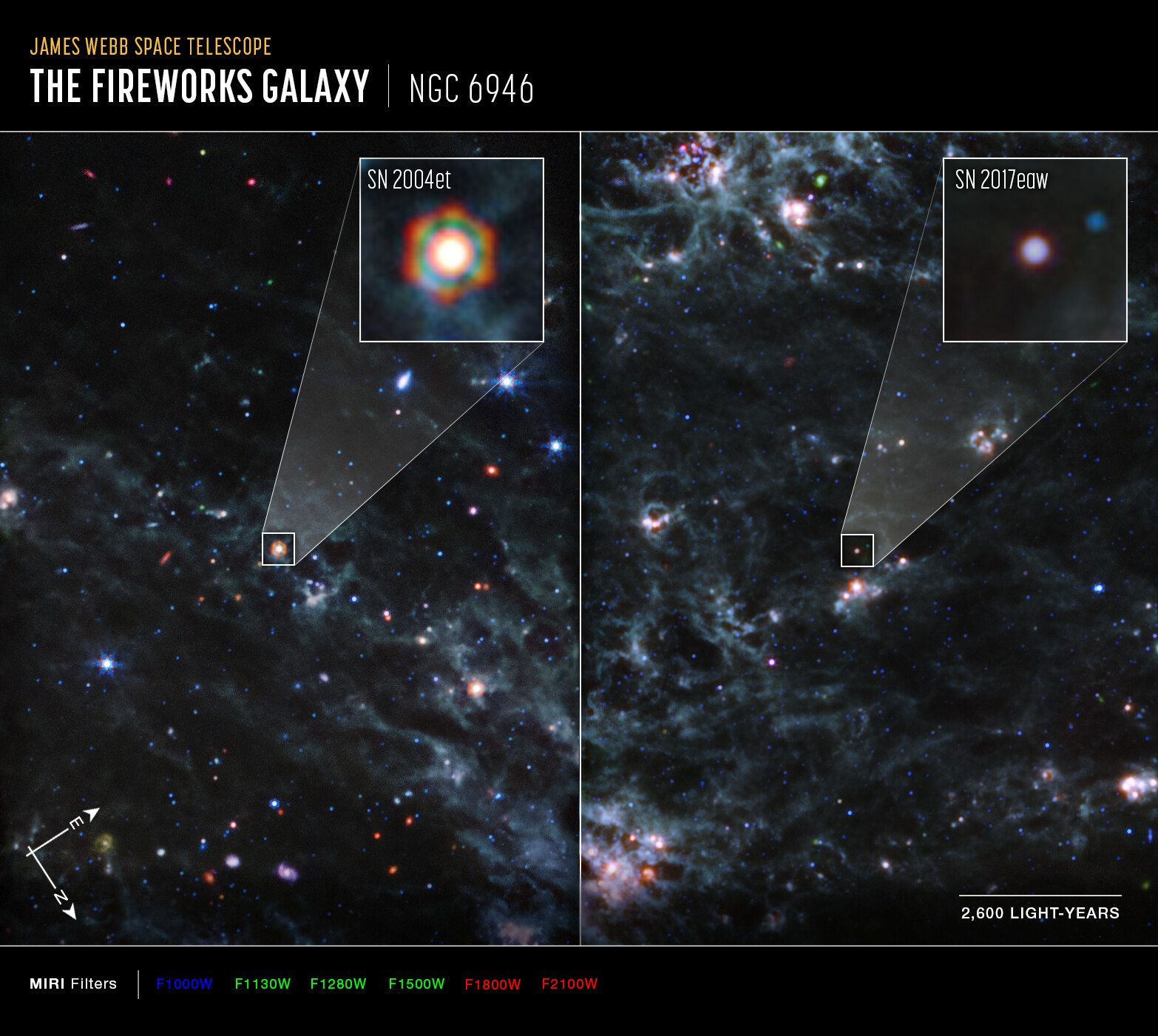
NASA/ESA/CSA James Webb Space Telescope image of NGC 6946, revealing large amounts of dust from the two supernovae SN 2004et and SN 2017eaw

== See also ==
- IC 342 – similar galaxy heavily obscured by Milky Way stars and dust.
- List of galaxies
