= SN 2004et =

Supernova in the constellation Cygnus

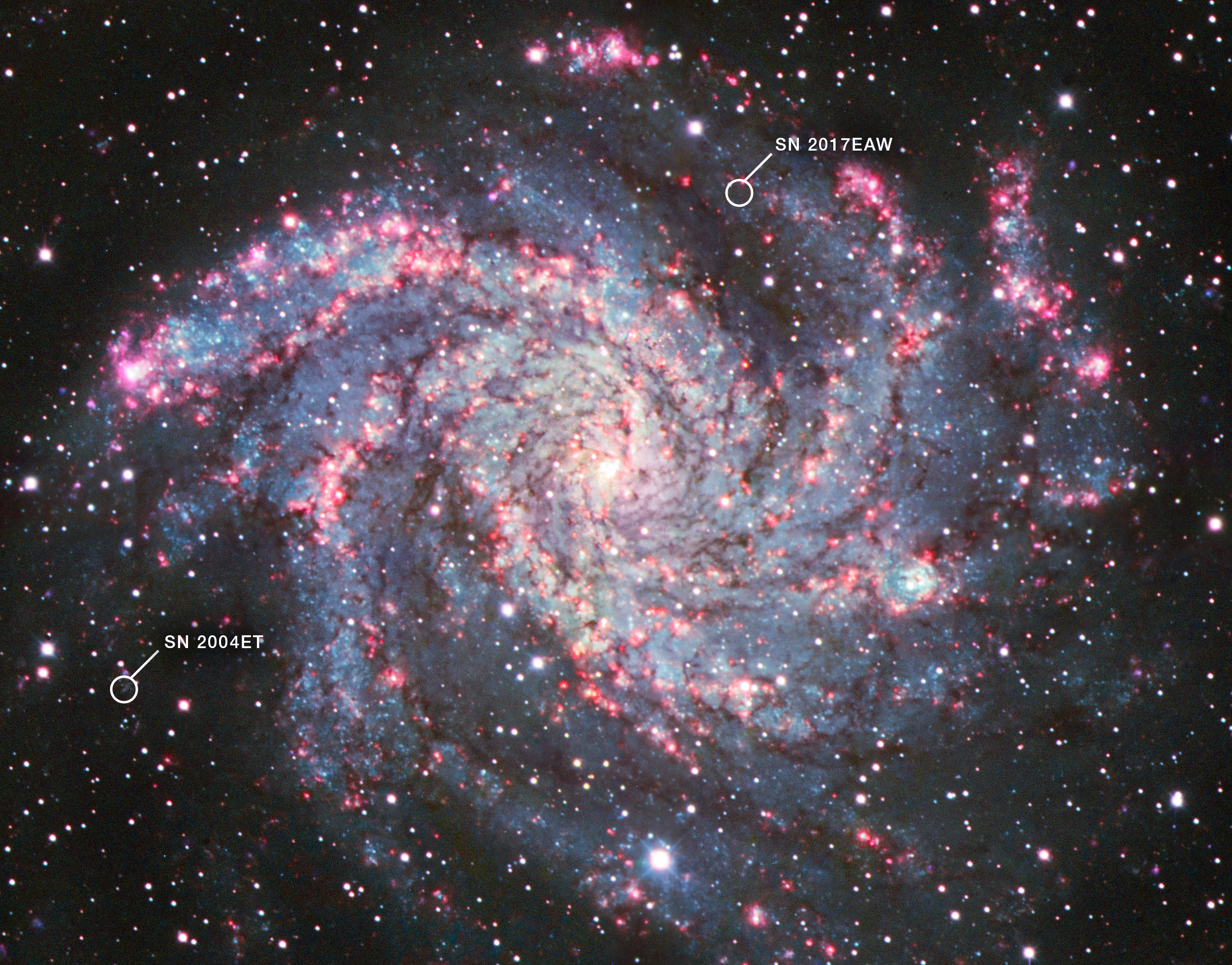
- Locations of SN 004et and SN 2017eaw in the Fireworks Galaxy, known for having many supernovas
- Event type: Supernova
- Type II-P
- Discovered: c. 22 million years ago (discovered 2004)
- Instrument: Spitzer Space Telescope
- Constellation: Cygnus
- Right ascension: 20^{h} 35^{m} 25.33^{s}
- Declination: +60° 07′ 17.6″
- Epoch: J2000.0
- Distance: c. 22 million ly
- Host: Fireworks Galaxy
- Progenitor: Red supergiant c. 13.8 solar masses
- Peak apparent magnitude: 20.89
- Other designations: SN 2004et
- Related media on Commons

SN 2004et was a bright Type II-P supernova that occurred in the spiral galaxy NGC 6946 (The Fireworks Galaxy), about 22 million light years away from Earth. The star that made the supernova was falsely identified to be a yellow supergiant but was then identified to be a red supergiant of 13.8 solar masses. SN 2004et showed some re-brightening about 1,000 days after the initial supernova probably due to ejecta of circumstellar material or thermal echo. SN 2004et was one of the most luminous Type II-P supernovae ever recorded and characterized.

== Discovery ==
SN 200et was discovered in 2004 and observed until 2009 by using the Spitzer InfarRed Array Camera, a ultra sensitive infrared space telescope that is used to study planets, stars, asteroids, comets, and galaxies.
