= Betelgeuse =

Red supergiant star in the constellation Orion

- Location of Betelgeuse (circled)

Observation data Epoch J2000 Equinox ICRS
- Constellation: Orion
- Pronunciation: /ˈbɛtəldʒuːz, ˈbiːt-, -dʒuːs/ BE(E)T-əl-jooz, -jooss
- Right ascension: 05^{h} 55^{m} 10.30536^{s}
- Declination: +07° 24′ 25.4304″
- Apparent magnitude (V): +0.50 (0.0–1.6)

Characteristics
- Evolutionary stage: Red supergiant
- Spectral type: M1–M2 Ia–ab
- Apparent magnitude (J): −3.00
- Apparent magnitude (K): −4.05
- U−B color index: +2.06
- B−V color index: +1.85
- Variable type: SRc

Astrometry
Radial velocity (R_{v})	+21.91 km/s
Proper motion (μ)	RA: 26.42±0.25 mas/yr Dec.: 9.60±0.12 mas/yr
Parallax (π)	5.95+0.58 −0.85 mas
Distance	408 – 548+90 −49 ly (125 – 168.1+27.5 −14.9 pc)
Absolute magnitude (M_{V})	−5.85

Details
Mass	14 M_{☉}
Radius	~640 – 764+116 −62 R_{☉}
Luminosity	~65,000 – 87,100+20,500 −11,200 L_{☉}
Surface gravity (log g)	−0.46±0.17 cgs
Temperature	3,779±38 K
Metallicity [Fe/H]	−0.13±0.09 dex
Rotation	36±8 years
Rotational velocity (v sin i)	5.47±0.25 km/s
Age	14 Myr

Other designations
- Betelgeuse, α Ori, 58 Ori, HR 2061, BD+07°1055, HD 39801, FK5 224, HIP 27989, SAO 113271, GC 7451, CCDM J05552+0724, AAVSO 0549+07

Database references
SIMBAD	data

Betelgeuse is a red supergiant star in the equatorial constellation of Orion. It is usually the tenth-brightest star in the night sky and, after Rigel, the second brightest in its constellation. It is a distinctly reddish, semiregular variable star whose apparent magnitude, varying between +0.0 and +1.6, with a main period near 400 days, has the widest range displayed by any first-magnitude star. Betelgeuse is the brightest star in the night sky at near-infrared wavelengths. Its Bayer designation is α Orionis, Latinised to Alpha Orionis and abbreviated Alpha Ori or α Ori.

With a radius between 640 and 764 times that of the Sun, if it were at the center of the Solar System, its surface would lie beyond the asteroid belt and it would engulf the orbits of Mercury, Venus, Earth, and Mars. Calculations of Betelgeuse's mass range from slightly under ten to a little over twenty times that of the Sun. For various reasons, its distance has been quite difficult to measure; current best estimates are of the order of 400–600 light-years from the Sun – a comparatively wide uncertainty for a relatively nearby star. Its absolute magnitude is about −6. With an age of less than 10 million years, Betelgeuse has evolved rapidly because of its large mass, and is expected to end its evolution with a supernova explosion, most likely within the next 100,000 years. When Betelgeuse detonates as a brilliant type II supernova, it will shine as bright as the half-Moon for more than three months; life on Earth will be unharmed. Having been ejected from its birthplace in the Orion OB1 association – which includes the stars in Orion's Belt – this runaway star has been observed to be moving through the interstellar medium at a speed of 30 km/s, creating a bow shock over four light-years wide.

Betelgeuse became the first extrasolar star whose photosphere's angular size was measured, in 1920, and whose image was resolved, in 1995. Subsequent studies have reported an angular diameter (i.e., apparent size) ranging from 0.042 to 0.056 arcseconds; that range of determinations is ascribed to non-sphericity, limb darkening, pulsations and varying appearance at different wavelengths. It is also surrounded by a complex, asymmetric envelope, roughly 250 times the size of the star, caused by mass loss from the star itself. The Earth-observed angular diameter of Betelgeuse is exceeded only by those of R Doradus and the Sun.

Starting in October 2019, Betelgeuse began to dim noticeably, and by mid-February 2020 its brightness had dropped by a factor of approximately 3, from magnitude 0.5 to 1.7. It then returned to a more normal brightness range, reaching a peak of 0.0 visual and 0.1 V-band magnitude in April 2023. Infrared observations found no significant change in luminosity over the last 50 years, suggesting that the dimming was due to a change in extinction around the star rather than a more fundamental change. A study using the Hubble Space Telescope suggests that occluding dust was created by a surface mass ejection; this material was cast millions of miles from the star, and then cooled to form the dust that caused the dimming.

Betelgeuse is likely a binary star. The companion star, named Betelgeuse B or Siwarha, is not yet fully confirmed to be gravitionally bound to Betelgeuse, but likely is given other, indirect evidence for a companion. It would be much smaller and fainter than the red supergiant and is believed to orbit at a distance only a few times greater than the size of Betelgeuse.

== Nomenclature and etymology ==
The star's Bayer designation is α Orionis (Alpha Orionis), given by Johann Bayer in 1603. The traditional name Betelgeuse was derived from the Arabic يد الجوزاء Yad al-Jawzā’ "the hand of al-Jawzā’ [i.e. Orion]". An error in the 13th-century reading of the Arabic initial yā’ (يـ) as bā’ (بـ—a difference in i‘jām) led to the European name. In English, there exist numerous pronunciations of this name. Some that utilize a "soft g" (/d͡ʒ/) vary depending on whether the first e is pronounced short or long, and whether the s is pronounced /s/ or /z/. These pronunciations have become common due their similarity to the name of the character Beetlejuice in the popular 1988 film Beetlejuice.

- /ˈbɛtəlˌdʒuːz/;
- /ˈbiːtəlˌdʒuːz/;
- /ˈbɛtəlˌdʒuːs/;
- /ˈbiːtəlˌdʒuːs/,

Other pronunciations that utilize a "hard g" (/g/) also exist, but have become less common over time.

- /ˈbeɪtəlˌɡiːs/;
- /ˈbɛtəlˌɡiːs/,

In 2016, the International Astronomical Union organized a Working Group on Star Names (WGSN) to catalog and standardize proper names for stars. The WGSN's first bulletin, issued July 2016, included a table of the first two batches of names approved by the WGSN, which included Betelgeuse for this star. It is now so entered in the IAU Catalog of Star Names.

The discoverers of the candidate companion star Betelgeuse B proposed the name Siwarha, which means her bracelet in Arabic. The name Siwarha has been officially recognized by the WGSN since 22 September 2025.

== Observational history ==
Betelgeuse and its red coloration have been noted since antiquity; the classical astronomer Ptolemy described its color as hypókirrhos (ὑπόκιρρος, 'more or less orange-tawny'), a term later described by a translator of Ulugh Beg's Zij-i Sultani as rubedo, Latin for 'ruddiness'. (Note: Stella lucida in umero dextro, quae ad rubedinem vergit. "Bright star in right shoulder, which inclines to ruddiness.") In the 19th century, before modern systems of stellar classification, Angelo Secchi included Betelgeuse as one of the prototypes for his Class III (orange to red) stars. Three centuries before Ptolemy, in contrast, Chinese astronomers observed Betelgeuse as yellow; such an observation, if accurate, could suggest the star was in a yellow supergiant phase around this time, a credible possibility, given current research into these stars' complex circumstellar environment.

=== Nascent discoveries ===
Aboriginal groups in South Australia have shared oral tales of the variable brightness of Betelgeuse for an unknown period.

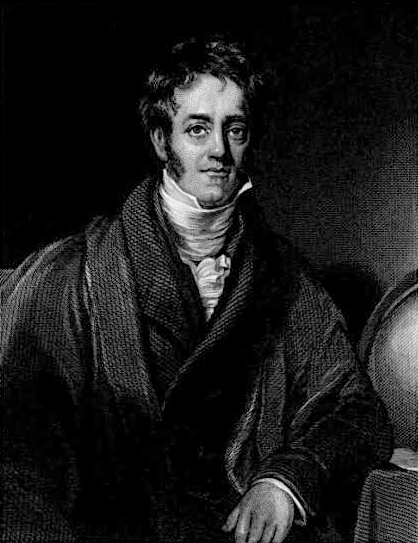
Sir John Herschel in 1846

The variation in Betelgeuse's brightness was described in 1836 by Sir John Herschel in Outlines of Astronomy. From 1836 to 1840, he noticed significant changes in magnitude when Betelgeuse outshone Rigel in October 1837 and again in November 1839. A 10-year quiescent period followed; then in 1849, Herschel noted another short cycle of variability, which peaked in 1852. Later observers recorded unusually high maxima with an interval of years, but only small variations from 1957 to 1967. The records of the American Association of Variable Star Observers (AAVSO) show a maximum brightness of 0.2 in 1933 and 1942, and a minimum of 1.2, observed in 1927 and 1941. This variability in brightness may explain why Johann Bayer, with the publication of his Uranometria in 1603, designated the star alpha, as it probably rivaled the usually brighter Rigel (beta). From Arctic latitudes, Betelgeuse's red color and higher location in the sky than Rigel meant the Inuit regarded it as brighter, and one local name was Ulluriajjuaq ("large star").

In 1920, Albert A. Michelson and Francis G. Pease mounted a six-meter interferometer on the front of the 2.5-meter telescope at Mount Wilson Observatory, helped by John August Anderson. The trio measured the angular diameter of Betelgeuse at 0.047″, a figure that resulted in a diameter of 3.84×10^{8} km (2.58 AU) based on the parallax value of 0.018″. But limb darkening and measurement errors resulted in uncertainty about the accuracy of these measurements.

The 1950s and 1960s saw two developments that affected stellar convection theory in red supergiants: the Stratoscope projects and the 1958 publication of Structure and Evolution of the Stars, principally the work of Martin Schwarzschild and his colleague at Princeton University, Richard Härm. This book disseminated ideas on how to apply computer technologies to create stellar models, while the Stratoscope projects, by taking balloon-borne telescopes above the Earth's turbulence, produced some of the finest images of solar granules and sunspots ever seen, thus confirming the existence of convection in the solar atmosphere.

=== Imaging breakthroughs ===
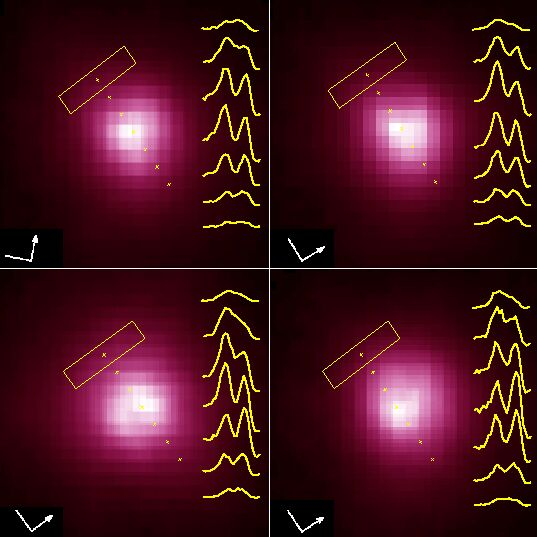
1998/9 ultraviolet (UV) Hubble Space Telescope images of Betelgeuse showing asymmetrical pulsations with corresponding spectral line profiles

Astronomers saw some major advances in astronomical imaging technology in the 1970s, beginning with Antoine Labeyrie's invention of speckle interferometry, a process that significantly reduced the blurring effect caused by astronomical seeing. It increased the optical resolution of ground-based telescopes, allowing for more precise measurements of Betelgeuse's photosphere. With improvements in infrared telescopy atop Mount Wilson, Mount Locke, and Mauna Kea in Hawaii, astrophysicists began peering into the complex circumstellar shells surrounding the supergiant, causing them to suspect the presence of huge gas bubbles resulting from convection. However, it was not until the late 1980s and early 1990s, when Betelgeuse became a regular target for aperture masking interferometry, that breakthroughs occurred in visible-light and infrared imaging. Pioneered by J.E. Baldwin and colleagues of the Cavendish Astrophysics Group, the new technique employed a small mask with several holes in the telescope pupil plane, converting the aperture into an ad hoc interferometric array. The technique contributed some of the most accurate measurements of Betelgeuse while revealing bright spots on the star's photosphere. These were the first optical and infrared images of a stellar disk other than the Sun, taken first from ground-based interferometers and later from higher-resolution observations of the COAST telescope. The "bright patches" or "hotspots" observed with these instruments appeared to corroborate a theory put forth by Schwarzschild decades earlier of massive convection cells dominating the stellar surface.

In 1995, the Hubble Space Telescope's Faint Object Camera captured an ultraviolet image with a resolution superior to that obtained by ground-based interferometers—the first conventional-telescope image (or "direct-image" in NASA terminology) of the disk of another star. Because ultraviolet light is absorbed by the Earth's atmosphere, observations at these wavelengths are best performed by space telescopes. This image, like earlier pictures, contained a bright patch indicating a region in the southwestern quadrant 2,000 K hotter than the stellar surface. Subsequent ultraviolet spectra taken with the Goddard High Resolution Spectrograph suggested that the hot spot was one of Betelgeuse's poles of rotation. This would give the rotational axis an inclination of about 20° to the direction of Earth, and a position angle from celestial North of about 55°.

=== 2000s studies ===
In a study published in December 2000, the star's diameter was measured with the Infrared Spatial Interferometer (ISI) at mid-infrared wavelengths producing a limb-darkened estimate of 55.2±0.5 mas – a figure entirely consistent with Michelson's findings eighty years earlier. At the time of its publication, the estimated parallax from the Hipparcos mission was 7.63±1.64 mas, yielding an estimated radius for Betelgeuse of 3.6 AU. However, an infrared interferometric study published in 2009 announced that the star had shrunk by 15% since 1993 at an increasing rate without a significant diminution in magnitude. Subsequent observations suggest that the apparent contraction may be due to shell activity in the star's extended atmosphere.

In addition to the star's diameter, questions have arisen about the complex dynamics of Betelgeuse's extended atmosphere. The mass that makes up galaxies is recycled as stars are formed and destroyed, and red supergiants are major contributors, yet the process by which mass is lost remains a mystery. With advances in interferometric methodologies, astronomers may be close to resolving this conundrum. Images released by the European Southern Observatory in July 2009, taken by the ground-based Very Large Telescope Interferometer (VLTI), showed a vast “plume” of gas extending 30 AU from the star into the surrounding atmosphere. This mass ejection was equal to the distance between the Sun and Neptune and is one of multiple events occurring in Betelgeuse's surrounding atmosphere. Astronomers have identified at least six shells surrounding Betelgeuse. Solving the mystery of mass loss in the late stages of a star's evolution may reveal those factors that precipitate the explosive deaths of these stellar giants.

=== 2019–2020 fading ===
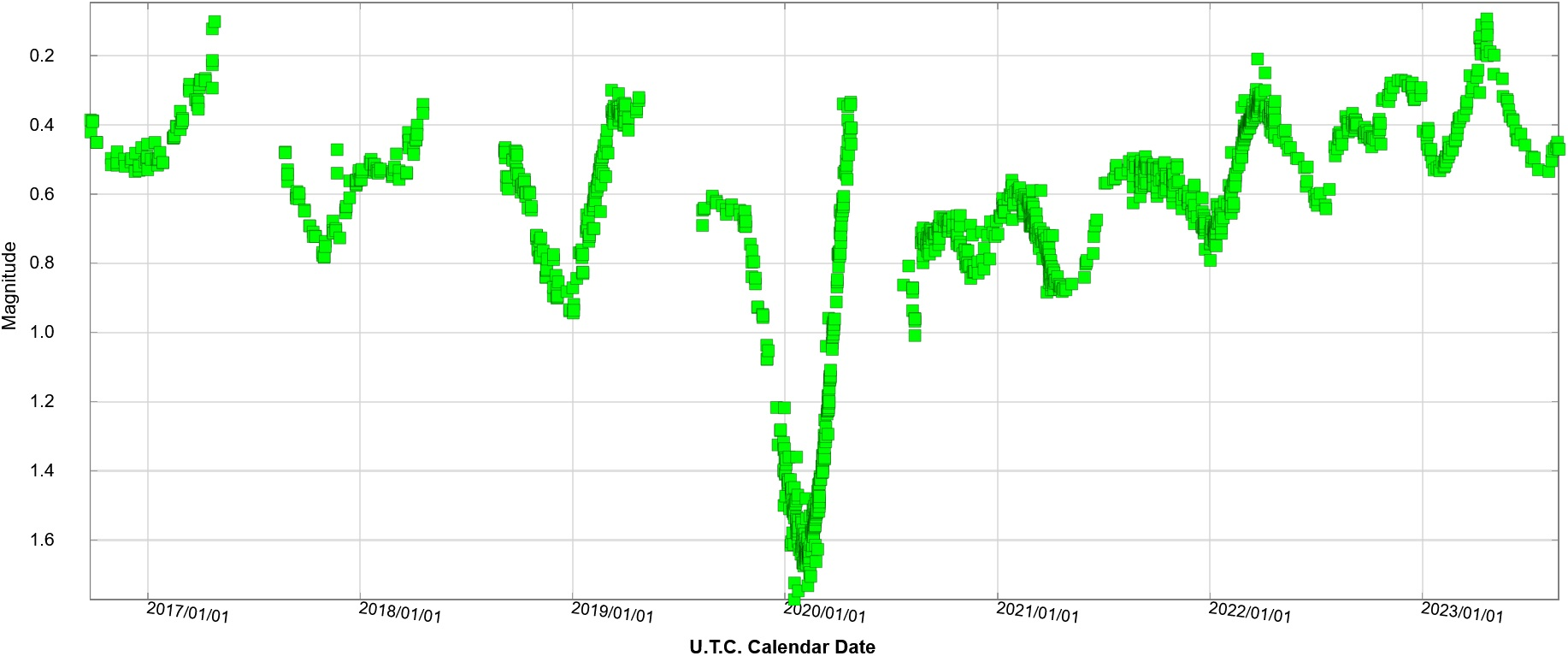
AAVSO V-band magnitude of Betelgeuse, between September 2016 and August 2023

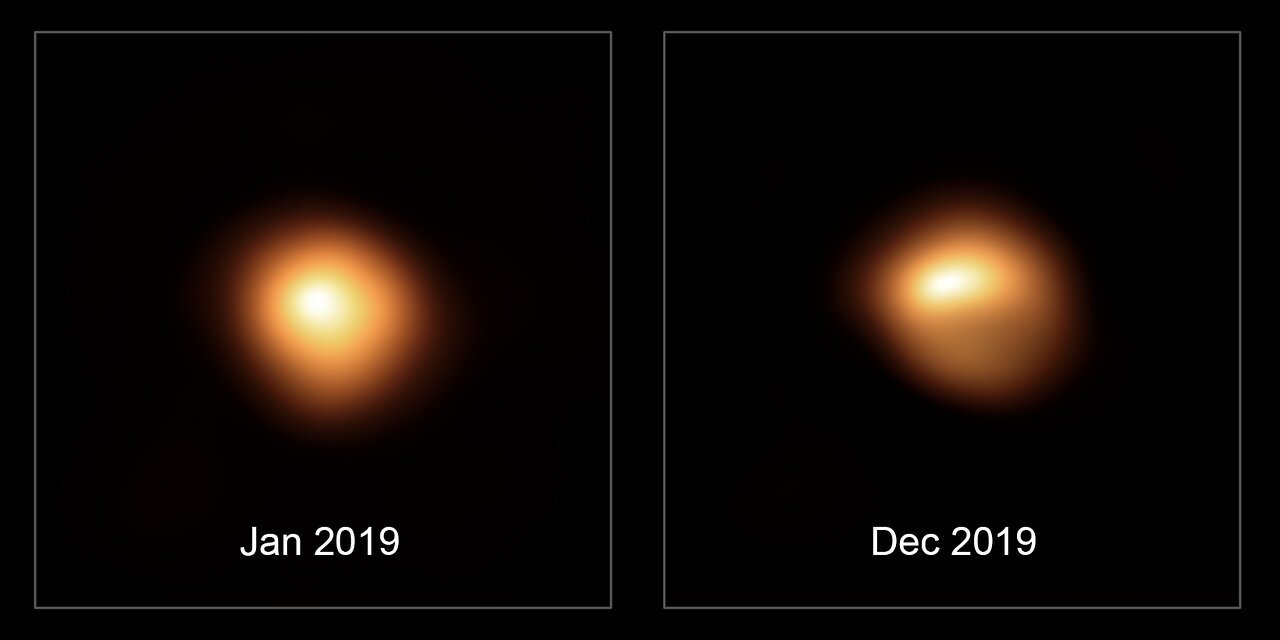
Comparison of SPHERE images of Betelgeuse taken in January 2019 and December 2019, showing the changes in brightness and shape

A pulsating semiregular variable star, Betelgeuse is subject to multiple cycles of increasing and decreasing brightness due to changes in its size and temperature. The astronomers who first noted the dimming of Betelgeuse, Villanova University astronomers Richard Wasatonic and Edward Guinan, and amateur Thomas Calderwood, theorize that a coincidence of a normal 5.9-year light-cycle minimum and a deeper-than-normal 425-day period are the driving factors. Other possible causes hypothesized by late 2019 were an eruption of gas or dust or fluctuations in the star's surface brightness.

By August 2020, long-term and extensive studies of Betelgeuse, primarily using ultraviolet observations by the Hubble Space Telescope, had suggested that the unexpected dimming was probably caused by an immense amount of superhot material ejected into space. The material cooled and formed a dust cloud that blocked the starlight coming from about a quarter of Betelgeuse's surface. Hubble captured signs of dense, heated material moving through the star's atmosphere in September, October and November before several telescopes observed the more marked dimming in December and the first few months of 2020.

By January 2020, Betelgeuse had dimmed by a factor of approximately 2.5 from magnitude 0.5 to 1.5 and was reported still fainter in February in The Astronomer's Telegram at a record minimum of +1.614, noting that the star is currently the "least luminous and coolest" in the 25 years of their studies and also calculating a decrease in radius. Astronomy magazine described it as a "bizarre dimming", and popular speculation inferred that this might indicate an imminent supernova. This dropped Betelgeuse from one of the top 10 brightest stars in the sky to outside the top 20, noticeably dimmer than its near neighbor Aldebaran. 2019 mainstream media reports discussed speculation that Betelgeuse might be about to explode as a supernova, but astronomers note that the supernova is expected to occur within approximately the next 100,000 years and is thus unlikely to be imminent.

By 17 February 2020, Betelgeuse's brightness had remained constant for about 10 days, and the star showed signs of rebrightening. On 22 February 2020, Betelgeuse may have stopped dimming altogether, all but ending the dimming episode. On 24 February 2020, no significant change in the infrared over the last 50 years was detected; this seemed unrelated to the recent visual fading and suggested that an impending core collapse may be unlikely. Also on 24 February 2020, further studies suggested that occluding "large-grain circumstellar dust" may be the most likely explanation for the dimming of the star. A study that uses observations at submillimetre wavelengths rules out significant contributions from dust absorption. Instead, large starspots appear to be the cause for the dimming. Followup studies, reported on 31 March 2020 in The Astronomer's Telegram, found a rapid rise in the brightness of Betelgeuse.

Betelgeuse is almost unobservable from the ground between May and August because it is too close to the Sun. Before entering its 2020 conjunction with the Sun, Betelgeuse had reached a brightness of +0.4 . Observations with the STEREO-A spacecraft made in June and July 2020 showed that the star had dimmed by 0.5 since the last ground-based observation in April. This was surprising, because a maximum was expected for August/September 2020, and the next minimum should have occurred around April 2021. However, Betelgeuse's brightness is known to vary irregularly, making predictions difficult. The fading could indicate that another dimming event might occur much earlier than expected. On 30 August 2020, astronomers reported the detection of a second dust cloud emitted from Betelgeuse, and associated with recent substantial dimming (a secondary minimum on 3 August) in luminosity of the star.

In June 2021, the dust was explained as possibly caused by a cool patch on its photosphere and in August a second independent group confirmed these results. The dust is thought to have resulted from the cooling of gas ejected from the star. An August 2022 study using the Hubble Space Telescope confirmed previous research and suggested the dust could have been created by a surface mass ejection. It conjectured as well that the dimming could have come from a short-term minimum coinciding with a long-term minimum producing a grand minimum, a 416-day cycle and 2,010-day cycle respectively, a mechanism first suggested by astronomer L. Goldberg. In April 2023, astronomers reported the star reached a peak of 0.0 visual and 0.1 V-band magnitude.

The episode is sometimes referred to as the "Great Dimming event".

== Observation ==
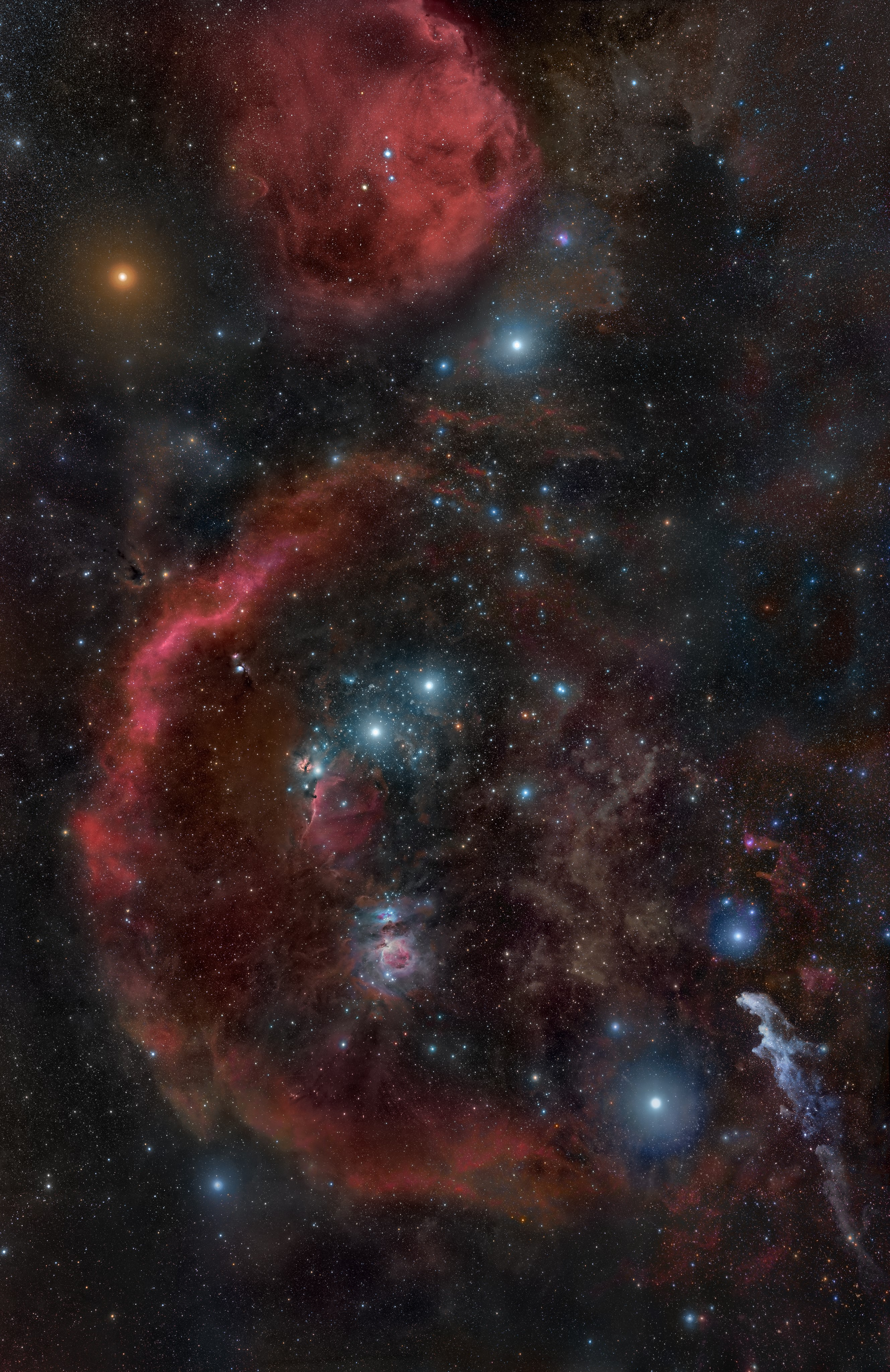
Image showing Betelgeuse (top left) and the dense nebulae of the Orion molecular cloud complex (Rogelio Bernal Andreo)

As a result of its distinctive orange-red color and position within Orion, Betelgeuse is easy to find with the naked eye. It is one of three stars that make up the Winter Triangle asterism, and it marks the center of the Winter Hexagon. It can be seen rising in the east at the beginning of January of each year, just after sunset. Between mid-September and mid-March (best in mid-December), it is visible to virtually every inhabited region of the globe, except in Antarctica at latitudes south of 82°. In May (moderate northern latitudes) or June (southern latitudes), the red supergiant can be seen briefly on the western horizon after sunset, reappearing again a few months later on the eastern horizon before sunrise. In the intermediate period (June–July, centered around mid June), it is invisible to the naked eye (visible only with a telescope in daylight), except around midday low in the north in Antarctic regions between 70° and 80° south latitude (during midday twilight in polar night, when the Sun is below the horizon).

Betelgeuse is a variable star whose visual magnitude ranges between 0.0 and +1.6 . There are periods during which it surpasses Rigel to become the sixth brightest star, and occasionally it will become even brighter than Capella. At its faintest, Betelgeuse can fall behind Deneb and Beta Crucis, themselves both slightly variable, to be the twentieth-brightest star.

Betelgeuse has a B–V color index of 1.85 – a figure which points to its pronounced "redness". The photosphere has an extended atmosphere, which displays strong lines of emission rather than absorption, a phenomenon that occurs when a star is surrounded by a thick gaseous envelope (rather than ionized). This extended gaseous atmosphere has been observed moving toward and away from Betelgeuse, depending on fluctuations in the photosphere. Betelgeuse is the brightest near-infrared source in the sky with a J band magnitude of −2.99; only about 13% of the star's radiant energy is emitted as visible light. If human eyes were sensitive to radiation at all wavelengths, Betelgeuse would appear as the brightest star in the night sky.

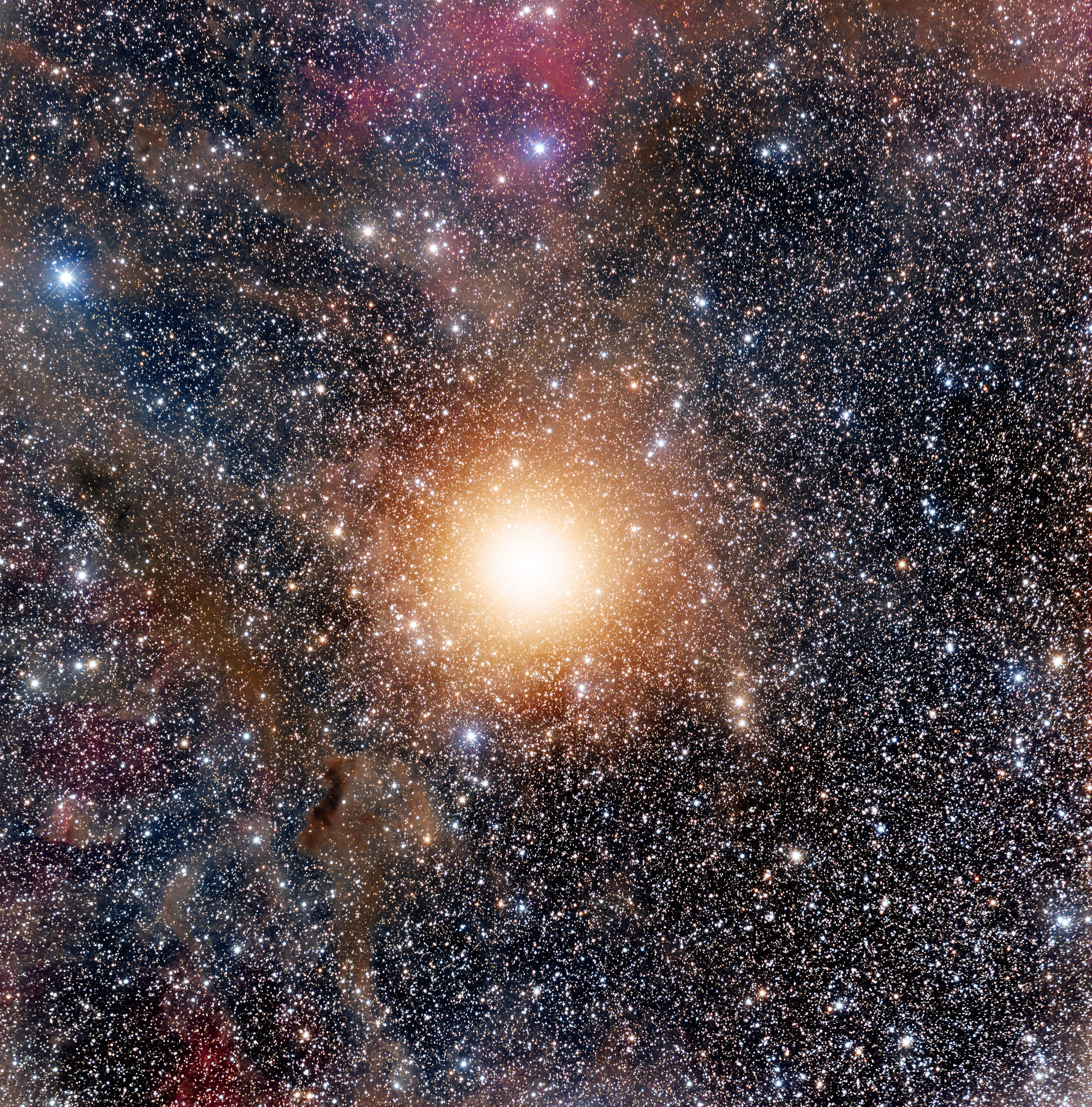
Betelgeuse seen close-up

Catalogues list up to nine faint visual companions to Betelgeuse. They are at distances of about one to four arc-minutes and all are fainter than 10th magnitude.

=== Distance measurements ===
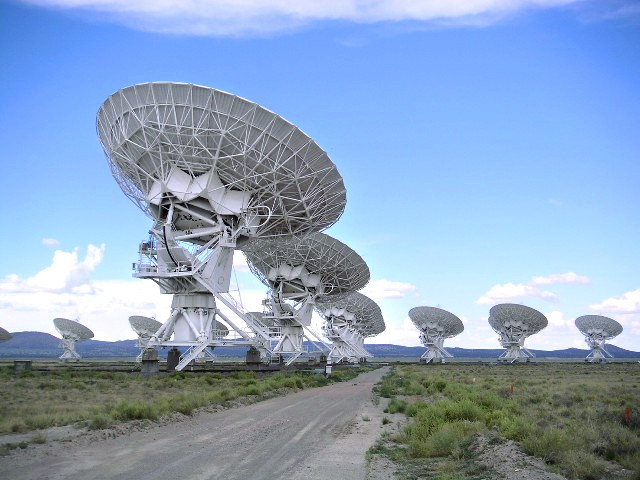
NRAO's Very Large Array used to derive Betelgeuse's 2008 distance estimate

Parallax is the apparent change of the position of an object, measured in seconds of arc, caused by the change of position of the observer of that object. Parallax is used in astronomy to estimate distances to the nearest stars. As the Earth orbits the Sun, every star is seen to shift by a fraction of an arc second, which measure, combined with the baseline provided by the Earth's orbit, gives the distance to that star. Since the first successful parallax measurement by Friedrich Bessel in 1838, astronomers have been puzzled by Betelgeuse's apparent distance. Knowledge of the star's distance improves the accuracy of other stellar parameters, such as luminosity, that, when combined with an angular diameter, can be used to calculate the physical radius and effective temperature; luminosity and isotopic abundances can also be used to estimate the stellar age and mass.

When the first interferometric studies were performed on the star's diameter in 1920, the assumed parallax was 0.0180″. This equated to a distance of 56 pc or roughly 180 ly, producing not only an inaccurate radius for the star but every other stellar characteristic. Since then, there has been ongoing work to measure the distance of Betelgeuse, with proposed distances as high as 400 pc or about 1,300 ly.

Before the publication of the Hipparcos Catalogue (1997), there were two slightly conflicting parallax measurements for Betelgeuse. The first, in 1991, gave a parallax of 9.8±4.7 mas, yielding a distance of roughly 102 pc or 330 ly. The second was the Hipparcos Input Catalogue (1993) with a trigonometric parallax of 5±4 mas, a distance of 200 pc or 650 ly. Given this uncertainty, researchers were adopting a wide range of distance estimates, leading to significant variances in the calculation of the star's attributes.

The results from the Hipparcos mission were released in 1997. The measured parallax of Betelgeuse was 7.63±1.64 mas, which equated to a distance of roughly 131 pc or 427 ly, and had a smaller reported error than previous measurements. However, later evaluation of the Hipparcos parallax measurements for variable stars like Betelgeuse found that the uncertainty of these measurements had been underestimated. In 2007, an improved figure of 6.55±0.83 was calculated, hence a much tighter error factor yielding a distance of roughly 152±20 pc or 500±65 ly.

In 2008, measurements using the Very Large Array (VLA) produced a radio solution of 5.07±1.10 mas, equaling a distance of 197±45 pc or 643±146 ly. As the researcher, Harper, points out: "The revised Hipparcos parallax leads to a larger distance (152±20 pc) than the original; however, the astrometric solution still requires a significant cosmic noise of 2.4 mas. Given these results it is clear that the Hipparcos data still contain systematic errors of unknown origin." Although the radio data also have systematic errors, the Harper solution combines the datasets in the hope of mitigating such errors. An updated result from further observations with ALMA and e-Merlin gives a parallax of 4.51±0.8 mas and a distance of 222+34
−48 pc or 724+111
−156 ly.

In 2020, new observational data from the space-based Solar Mass Ejection Imager aboard the Coriolis satellite and three different modeling techniques produced a refined parallax of 5.95+0.58
−0.8 mas, a radius of 764+116
−62 R_{☉}, and a distance of 168.1+27.5
−14.4 pc or 548+90
−49 ly, which would imply Betelgeuse is nearly 25% smaller and 25% closer to Earth than previously thought.

Another study in 2022 suggests Betelgeuse to be smaller and closer than previously thought based on historical records which revealed Betelgeuse changed in color from yellow to red in the last thousand years. This color change suggests an initial mass of 14 M_{☉}, considerably less than previous estimates, and the best-fit evolutionary track gives an estimate as low as 125 parsecs (410 light-years), consistent with the Hipparcos data.

The European Space Agency's Gaia mission was unable to produce good parallax results for stars like Betelgeuse which are brighter than the approximately V=6 saturation limit of the mission's instruments. Because of this limitation, there was no data on Betelgeuse in Gaia Data Release 2, from 2018 or Data Release 3 from 2022.

=== Variability ===
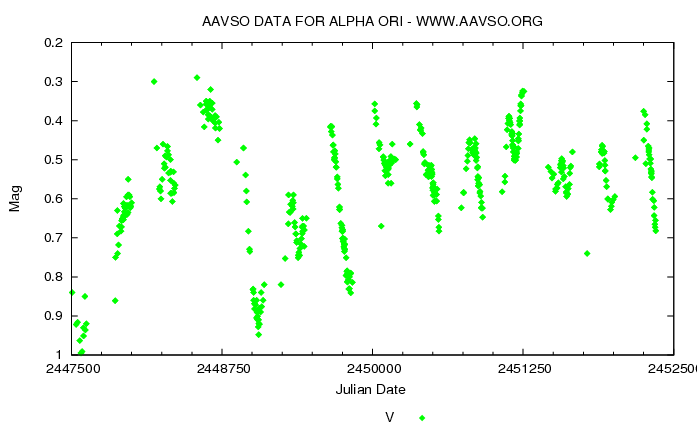
AAVSO V-band light curve of Betelgeuse (Alpha Orionis) from Dec 1988 to Aug 2002

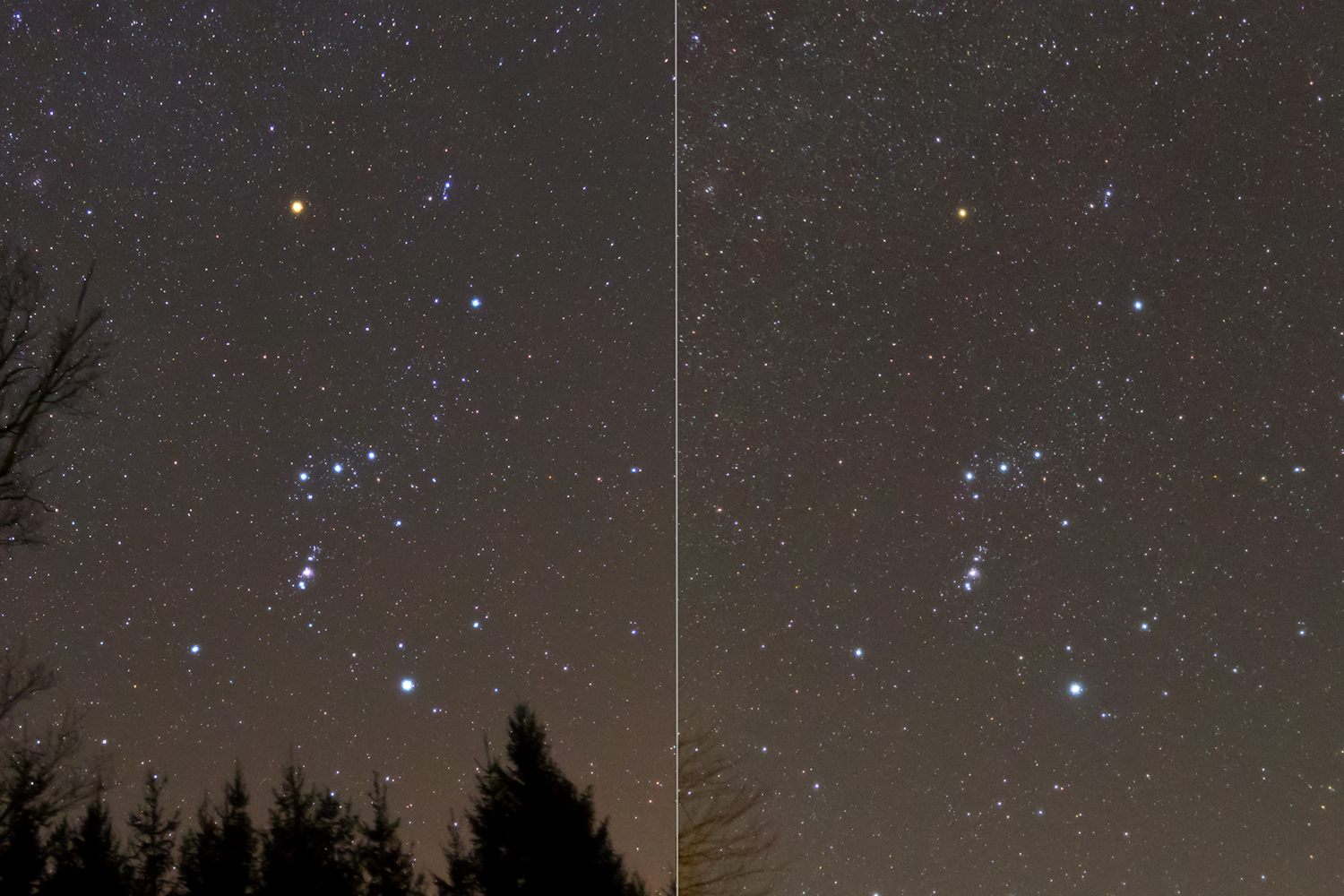
Orion, with Betelgeuse at its usual magnitude (left) and during the unusually deep minimum in early 2020 (right)

Betelgeuse is classified as a semiregular variable star, indicating that some periodicity is noticeable in the brightness changes, but amplitudes may vary, cycles may have different lengths, and there may be standstills or periods of irregularity. It is placed in subgroup SRc; these are pulsating red supergiants with amplitudes around one magnitude and periods from tens to hundreds of days.

Betelgeuse typically shows only small brightness changes near to magnitude +0.5, although at its extremes it can become as bright as magnitude 0.0 or as faint as magnitude +1.6. Betelgeuse is listed in the General Catalogue of Variable Stars with a possible period of 2,335 days. More detailed analyses have shown a main period near 400 days, a short period of 185 days, and a longer secondary period around 2,100 days. The lowest reliably-recorded V-band magnitude of +1.614 was reported in February 2020.

Radial pulsations of red supergiants are well-modelled and show that periods of a few hundred days are typically due to fundamental and first overtone pulsation. Lines in the spectrum of Betelgeuse show doppler shifts indicating radial velocity changes corresponding, very roughly, to the brightness changes. This demonstrates the nature of the pulsations in size, although corresponding temperature and spectral variations are not clearly seen. Variations in the diameter of Betelgeuse have also been measured directly. First overtone pulsations of 185 days have been observed, and the ratio of the fundamental to overtone periods gives valuable information about the internal structure of the star and its age.

The source of the long secondary periods is unknown, but they cannot be explained by radial pulsations. Interferometric observations of Betelgeuse have shown hotspots that are thought to be created by massive convection cells, a significant fraction of the diameter of the star and each emitting 5–10% of the total light of the star. One theory to explain long secondary periods is that they are caused by the evolution of such cells combined with the rotation of the star. Other theories include close binary interactions, chromospheric magnetic activity influencing mass loss, or non-radial pulsations such as g-modes.

In addition to the discrete dominant periods, small-amplitude stochastic variations are seen. It is proposed that this is due to granulation, similar to the same effect on the sun but on a much larger scale.

=== Diameter ===
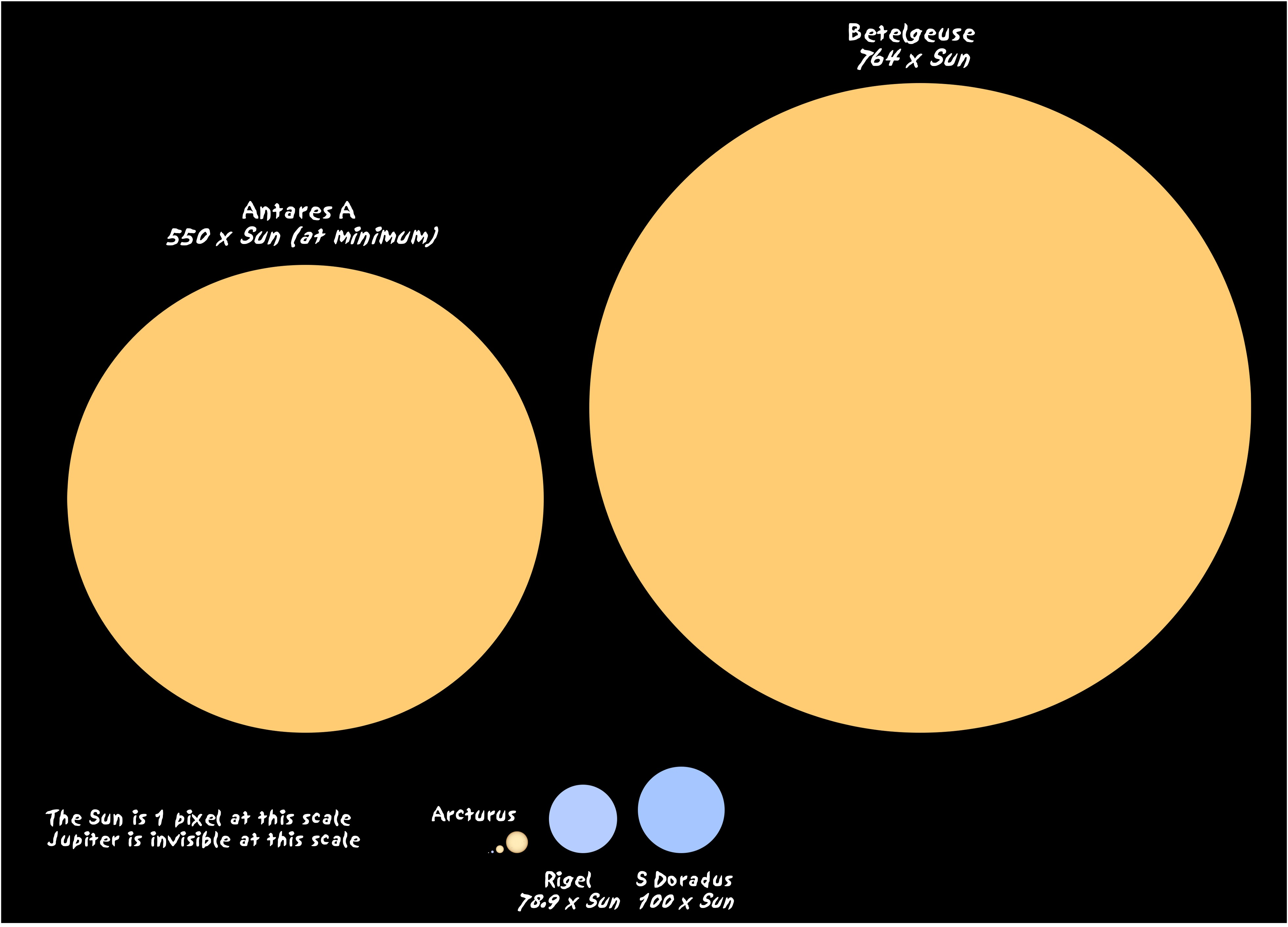
Size comparison between Arcturus, Rigel, S Doradus, Antares, and Betelgeuse

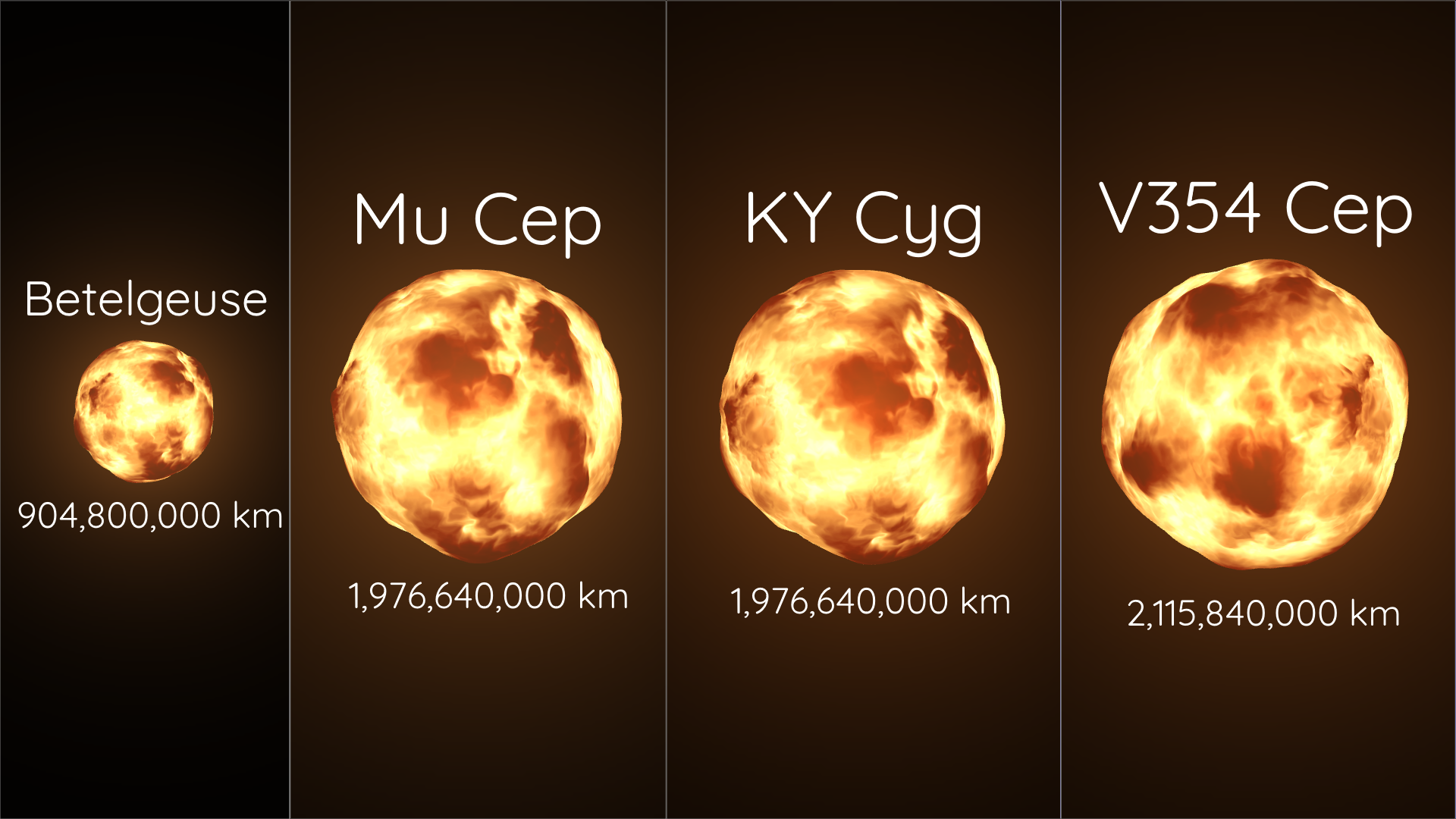
Size comparison of Betelgeuse, Mu Cephei, KY Cygni, and V354 Cephei, according to Emily Levesque

On 13 December 1920, Betelgeuse became the first star outside the Solar System to have the angular size of its photosphere measured. Although interferometry was still in its infancy, the experiment proved a success. The researchers, using a uniform disk model, determined that Betelgeuse had a diameter of 0.047″, although the stellar disk was likely 17% larger due to the limb darkening, resulting in an estimate for its angular diameter of about 0.055". Since then, other studies have produced angular diameters that range from 0.042 to 0.069″. Combining these data with historical distance estimates of 180 to 815 ly yields a projected radius of the stellar disk of anywhere from 1.2 to 8.9 AU. Using the Solar System for comparison, the orbit of Mars is about 1.5 AU, Ceres in the asteroid belt 2.7 AU, Jupiter 5.5 AU—so, assuming Betelgeuse occupying the place of the Sun, its photosphere might extend beyond the Jovian orbit, not quite reaching Saturn at 9.5 AU.

By 1925, more estimates have been given for large stars from interferometry by Francis G. Pease at the Mount Wilson Observatory, such as Mira, which was considered the then-second largest star known, comparable to historical estimates of Betelgeuse, surpassed only by Antares.

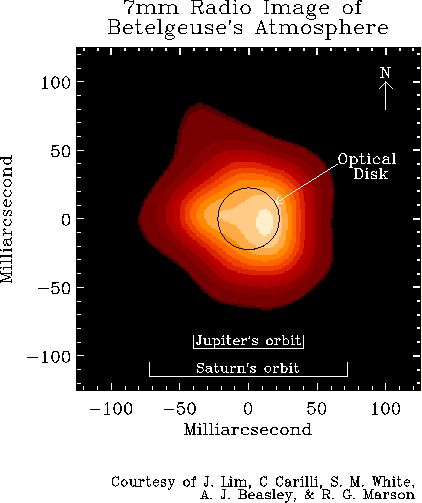
Radio image from 1998 showing the size of Betelgeuse's photosphere (circle) and the effect of convective forces on the star's atmosphere

The precise diameter has been hard to define for several reasons:

1. Betelgeuse is a pulsating star, so its diameter changes with time;
2. The star has no definable "edge" as limb darkening causes the optical emissions to vary in color and decrease the farther one extends out from the center;
3. Betelgeuse is surrounded by a circumstellar envelope composed of matter ejected from the star—matter which absorbs and emits light—making it difficult to define the photosphere of the star;
4. Measurements can be taken at varying wavelengths within the electromagnetic spectrum and the difference in reported diameters can be as much as 30–35%, yet comparing one finding with another is difficult as the star's apparent size differs depending on the wavelength used. Studies have shown that the measured angular diameter is considerably larger at ultraviolet wavelengths, decreases through the visible to a minimum in the near-infrared, and increase again in the mid-infrared spectrum;
5. Atmospheric twinkling limits the resolution obtainable from ground-based telescopes since turbulence degrades angular resolution.

The generally reported radii of large cool stars are Rosseland radii, defined as the radius of the photosphere at a specific optical depth of two-thirds. This corresponds to the radius calculated from the effective temperature and bolometric luminosity. The Rosseland radius differs from directly measured radii, with corrections for limb darkening and the observation wavelength. For example, a measured angular diameter of 55.6 milliarcseconds (mas) would correspond to a Rosseland mean diameter of 56.2 mas, while further corrections for the existence of surrounding dust and gas shells would give a diameter of 41.9 mas.

To overcome these challenges, researchers have employed various solutions. Astronomical interferometry, first conceived by Hippolyte Fizeau in 1868, was the seminal concept that has enabled major improvements in modern telescopy and led to the creation of the Michelson interferometer in the 1880s, and the first successful measurement of Betelgeuse. Just as human depth perception increases when two eyes instead of one perceive an object, Fizeau proposed the observation of stars through two apertures instead of one to obtain interferences that would furnish information on the star's spatial intensity distribution. The science evolved quickly and multiple-aperture interferometers are now used to capture speckled images, which are synthesized using Fourier analysis to produce a portrait of high resolution. It was this methodology that identified the hotspots on Betelgeuse in the 1990s. Other technological breakthroughs include adaptive optics, space observatories like Hipparcos, Hubble and Spitzer, and the Astronomical Multi-BEam Recombiner (AMBER), which combines the beams of three telescopes simultaneously, allowing researchers to achieve milliarcsecond spatial resolution.

Observations in different regions of the electromagnetic spectrum—the visible, near-infrared (NIR), mid-infrared (MIR), or radio—produce very different angular measurements. In 1996, Betelgeuse was shown to have a uniform disk of 56.6±1.0 mas. In 2000, a Space Sciences Laboratory team measured a diameter of 54.7±0.3 mas, ignoring any possible contribution from hotspots, which are less noticeable in the mid-infrared. Also included was a theoretical allowance for limb darkening, yielding a diameter of 55.2±0.5 mas. The earlier estimate equates to a radius of roughly 5.6 AU or 1,200 R_{☉}, assuming the 2008 Harper distance of 197.0±45 pc, a figure roughly the size of the Jovian orbit of 5.5 AU.

In 2004, a team of astronomers working in the near-infrared announced that the more accurate photospheric measurement was 43.33±0.04 mas. The study also put forth an explanation as to why varying wavelengths from the visible to mid-infrared produce different diameters: The star is seen through a thick, warm extended atmosphere. At short wavelengths (the visible spectrum) the atmosphere scatters light, thus slightly increasing the star's diameter. At near-infrared wavelengths (K and L bands), the scattering is negligible, so the classical photosphere can be directly seen; in the mid-infrared the scattering increases once more, causing the thermal emission of the warm atmosphere to increase the apparent diameter.

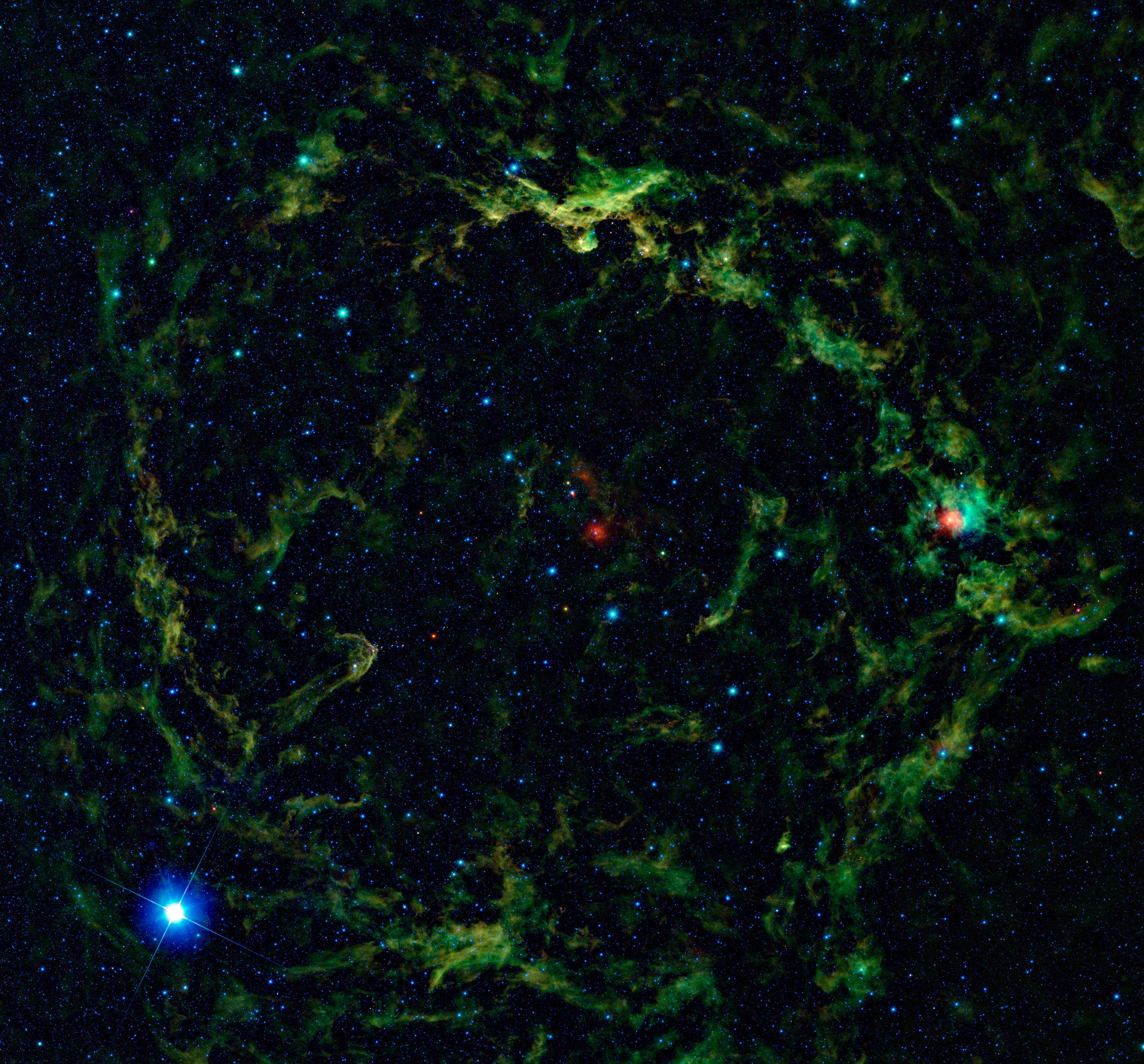
Infrared image of Betelgeuse, Meissa and Bellatrix with surrounding nebulae

Studies with the IOTA and VLTI published in 2009 brought strong support to the idea of dust shells and a molecular shell (MOLsphere) around Betelgeuse, and yielded diameters ranging from 42.57 to 44.28 mas with comparatively insignificant margins of error. In 2011, a third estimate in the near-infrared corroborating the 2009 numbers, this time showing a limb-darkened disk diameter of 42.49±0.06 mas. (Note: "We derive a uniform-disk diameter of 42.05±0.05 mas and a power-law-type limb-darkened disk diameter of 42.49±0.06 mas and a limb-darkening parameter of (9.7±0.5)×10^{−2}") The near-infrared photospheric diameter of 43.33 mas at the Hipparcos distance of 152±20 pc equates to about 3.4 AU or 730 R_{☉}. A 2014 paper derives an angular diameter of 42.28 mas (equivalent to a 41.01 mas uniform disc) using H and K band observations made with the VLTI AMBER instrument.

In 2009 it was announced that the radius of Betelgeuse had shrunk from 1993 to 2009 by 15%, with the 2008 angular measurement equal to 47.0 mas. (Note: The shrinkage corresponds to the star contracting by a distance equal to that between Venus and the Sun, researchers reported 9 June at an American Astronomical Society meeting and in the June 1 Astrophysical Journal Letters.) Unlike most earlier papers, this study used measurements at one specific wavelength over 15 years. The diminution in Betelgeuse's apparent size equates to a range of values between 56.0±0.1 mas seen in 1993 to 47.0±0.1 mas seen in 2008— a contraction of almost 0.9 AU in 15 years. The observed contraction is generally believed to be a variation in just a portion of the extended atmosphere around Betelgeuse, and observations at other wavelengths have shown an increase in diameter over a similar period.

The latest models of Betelgeuse adopt a photospheric angular diameter of around 43 mas, with multiple shells out to 50–60 mas. Assuming a distance of 197 pc, this means a stellar diameter of 887±203 R_{☉}.

Once considered as having the largest angular diameter of any star in the sky after the Sun, Betelgeuse lost that distinction in 1997 when a group of astronomers measured R Doradus with a diameter of 57.0±0.5 mas, although R Doradus, being much closer to Earth at about 200 ly, has a linear diameter roughly one-third that of Betelgeuse.

=== Occultations ===
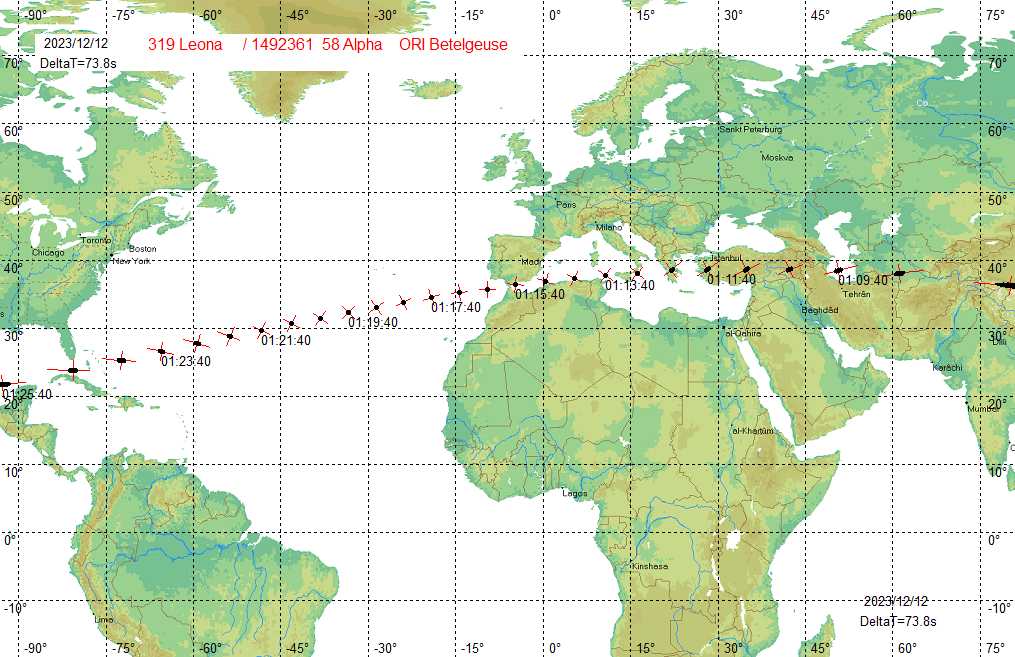
Predicted path of the occultation of Betelgeuse by (319) Leona on 12 December 2023, using the SOLEX software

Betelgeuse is too far from the ecliptic to be occulted by the major planets, but occultations by some asteroids (which are more wide-ranging and much more numerous) occur frequently. A partial occultation by the 19th magnitude asteroid (147857) 2005 UW_{381} occurred on 2 January 2012. It was partial because the angular diameter of the star was larger than that of the asteroid; the brightness of Betelgeuse dropped by only about 0.01 magnitudes.

The 14th magnitude asteroid 319 Leona was predicted to occult on 12 December 2023, 01:12 UTC. Totality was at first uncertain, and the occulation was projected to only last approximately twelve seconds (visible on a narrow path on Earth's surface, the exact width and location of which was initially uncertain due to lack of precise knowledge of the size and path of the asteroid). Projections were later refined as more data were analyzed for a totality ("ring of fire") of approximately five seconds and a 60 km wide path stretching from Tajikistan, Armenia, Turkey, Greece, Italy, Spain, the Atlantic Ocean, Miami, Florida and the Florida Keys to parts of Mexico. (The serendipitous event would also afford detailed observations of 319 Leona itself.) Among other programmes 80 amateur astronomers in Europe alone were coordinated by astrophysicist Miguel Montargès, et al. of the Paris Observatory for the event.

== Physical characteristics ==
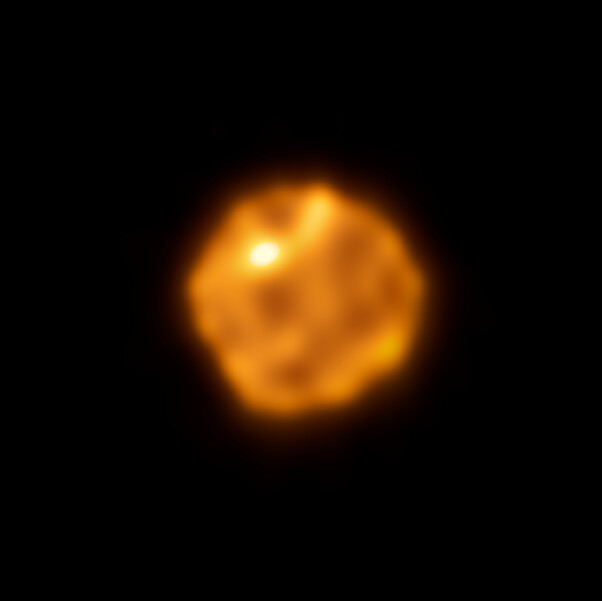
The surface of Betelgeuse resolved by ALMA in 2026

Betelgeuse is a very large, luminous but cool star classified as an M1-2 Ia-ab red supergiant. The letter "M" in this designation means that it is a red star belonging to the M spectral class and therefore has a relatively low photospheric temperature; the "Ia-ab" suffix luminosity class indicates that it is an intermediate-luminosity supergiant, with properties partway between a normal supergiant and a luminous supergiant. Since 1943, the spectrum of Betelgeuse has served as one of the stable anchor points by which other stars are classified.

Uncertainty in the star's surface temperature, diameter, and distance make it difficult to achieve a precise measurement of Betelgeuse's luminosity, but research from 2012 quotes a luminosity of around 126,000 L_{☉}, assuming a distance of 200 pc. Studies since 2001 report effective temperatures ranging from 3,250 to 3,690 K. Values outside this range have previously been reported, and much of the variation is believed to be real, due to pulsations in the atmosphere. The star is also a slow rotator and the most recent velocity recorded was 5.45 km/s—much slower than Antares which has a rotational velocity of 20 km/s. The rotation period depends on Betelgeuse's size and orientation to Earth, but it has been calculated to take 36 years to turn on its axis, inclined at an angle of around 60° to Earth.

In 2004, astronomers using computer simulations speculated that even if Betelgeuse is not rotating it might exhibit large-scale magnetic activity in its extended atmosphere, a factor where even moderately strong fields could have a meaningful influence over the star's dust, wind and mass-loss properties. A series of spectropolarimetric observations obtained in 2010 with the Bernard Lyot Telescope at Pic du Midi Observatory revealed the presence of a weak magnetic field at the surface of Betelgeuse, suggesting that the giant convective motions of supergiant stars are able to trigger the onset of a small-scale dynamo effect.

=== Mass ===
Modern mass estimates from theoretical modelling have produced values of 9.5–21 M_{☉}, with values of 5 M_{☉}–30 M_{☉} from older studies. It has been calculated that Betelgeuse began its life as a star of 15–20 M_{☉}, based on a solar luminosity of 90,000–150,000. A novel method of determining the supergiant's mass was proposed in 2011, arguing for a current stellar mass of 11.6 M_{☉} with an upper limit of 16.6 and lower of 7.7 M_{☉}, based on observations of the star's intensity profile from narrow H-band interferometry and using a photospheric measurement of roughly 4.3 AU or 955±217 R_{☉}. A probabilistic age prior analysis give a current mass of 16.5–19 M_{☉} and an initial mass of 18–21 M_{☉}.

Betelgeuse's mass can also be estimated based on its position on the color‑magnitude‑diagram (CMD). Betelgeuse's color may have changed from yellow (or possibly orange; i.e. a yellow supergiant) to red in the last few thousand years, based on a 2022 review of historical records. This color change combined with the CMD suggest a mass of 14 M_{☉}, an age of 14 million years and a distance of 125 parsecs (410 ly).

=== Motion ===
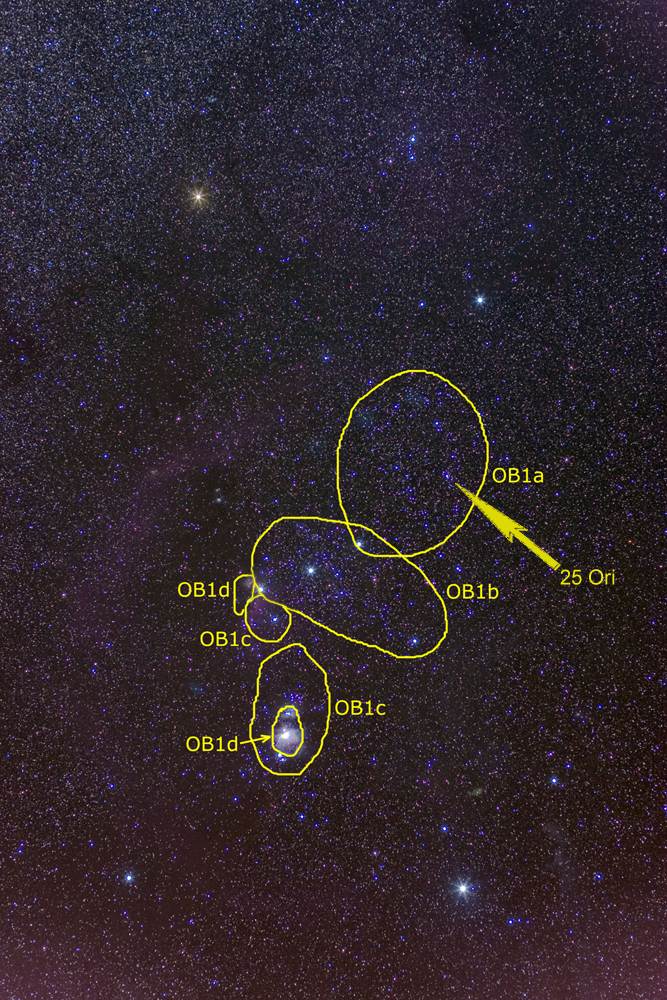
Map showing the Orion OB1 association, which contains the blue supergiants of Orion's Belt and the Orion Nebula. Betelgeuse is believed to be a runaway star that was ejected from the Orion OB1 association.

The kinematics of Betelgeuse are complex. The age of class M supergiants with an initial mass of 20 M_{☉} is roughly 10 million years. Starting from its present position and motion, a projection back in time would place Betelgeuse around 290 parsecs farther from the galactic plane—an implausible location, as there is no star formation region there. Moreover, Betelgeuse's projected pathway does not appear to intersect with the 25 Ori subassociation or the far younger Orion Nebula Cluster (ONC, also known as Ori OB1d), particularly since Very Long Baseline Array astrometry yields a distance from Betelgeuse to the ONC of between 389 and 414 parsecs. Consequently, it is likely that Betelgeuse has not always had its current motion through space but has changed course at one time or another, possibly the result of a nearby stellar explosion. An observation by the Herschel Space Observatory in January 2013 revealed that the star's winds are crashing against the surrounding interstellar medium.

The most likely star-formation scenario for Betelgeuse is that it is a runaway star from the Orion OB1 association. Originally a member of a high-mass multiple system within Ori OB1a, Betelgeuse was probably formed about 10–12 million years ago, but has evolved rapidly due to its high mass. H. Bouy and J. Alves suggested in 2015 that Betelgeuse may instead be a member of the newly discovered Taurion OB association.

=== Circumstellar dynamics ===
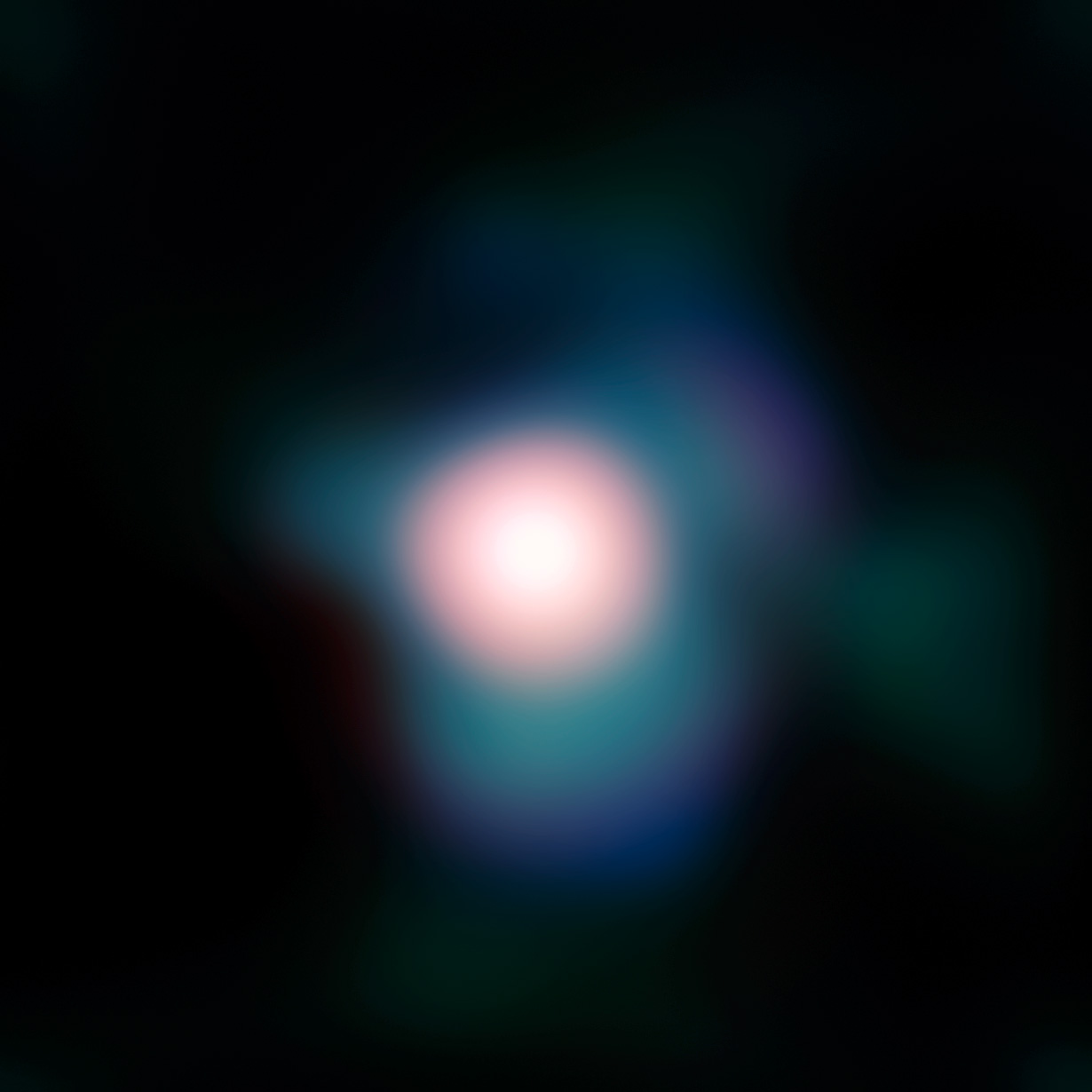
Image from ESO's Very Large Telescope showing the stellar disk and an extended atmosphere with a previously unknown plume of surrounding gas

In the late phase of stellar evolution, massive stars like Betelgeuse exhibit high rates of mass loss, possibly as much as one M_{☉} every 10,000 years, resulting in a complex circumstellar environment that is constantly in flux. In a 2009 paper, stellar mass loss was cited as the "key to understanding the evolution of the universe from the earliest cosmological times to the current epoch, and of planet formation and the formation of life itself". However, the physical mechanism is not well understood. When Martin Schwarzschild first proposed his theory of huge convection cells, he argued it was the likely cause of mass loss in evolved supergiants like Betelgeuse. Recent work has corroborated this hypothesis, yet there are still uncertainties about the structure of their convection, the mechanism of their mass loss, the way dust forms in their extended atmosphere, and the conditions which precipitate their dramatic finale as a Type II supernova. In 2001, Graham Harper estimated a stellar wind at 0.03 M_{☉} every 10,000 years, but research since 2009 has provided evidence of episodic mass loss making any total figure for Betelgeuse uncertain. Current observations suggest that a star like Betelgeuse may spend a portion of its lifetime as a red supergiant, but then cross back across the H–R diagram, pass once again through a brief yellow supergiant phase and then explode as a blue supergiant or Wolf–Rayet star.

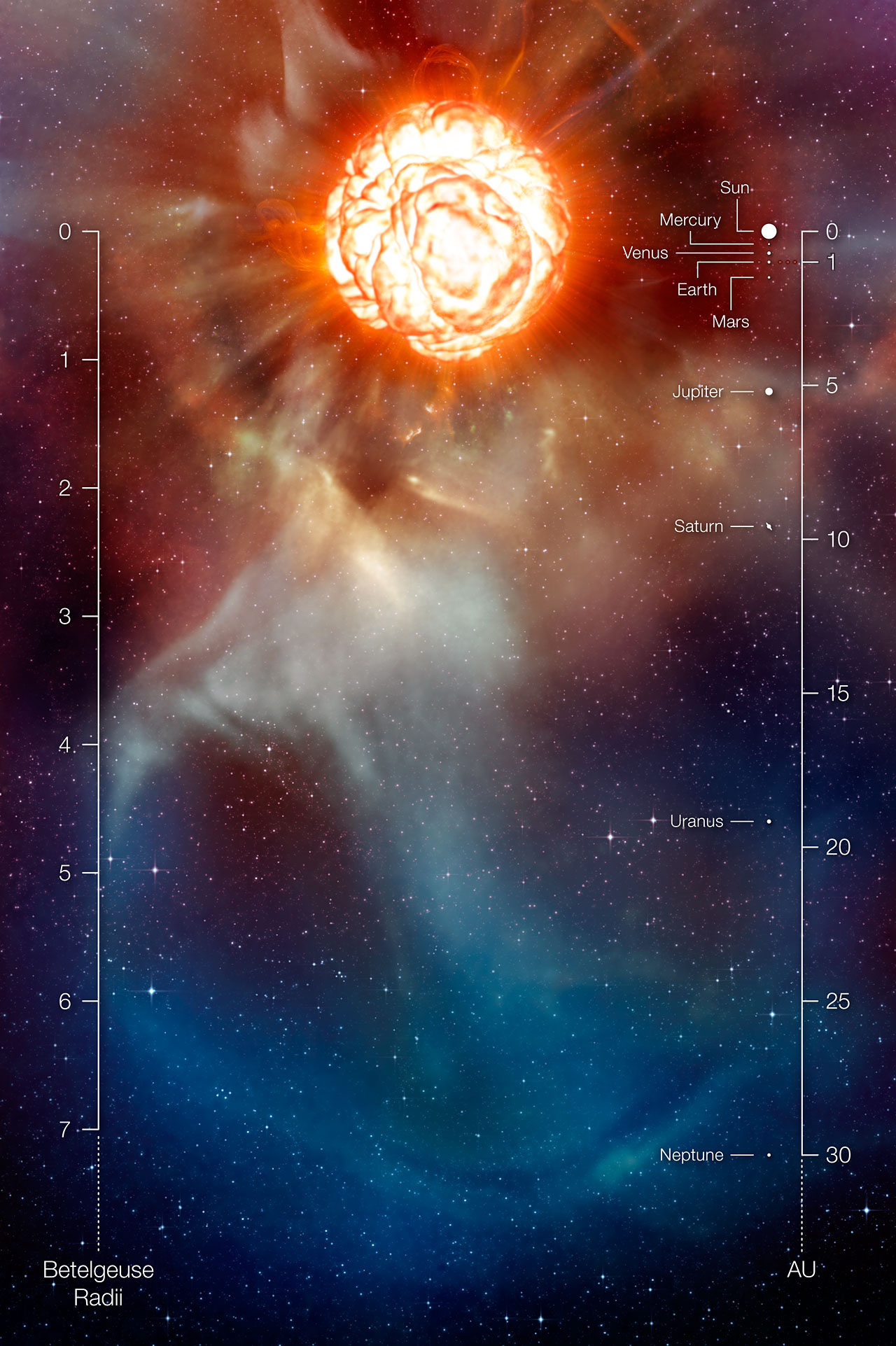
Artist's rendering from ESO showing Betelgeuse with a gigantic bubble boiling on its surface and a radiant plume of gas being ejected to six photospheric radii or roughly the orbit of Neptune

Astronomers may be close to solving this mystery. They noticed a large plume of gas extending at least six times its stellar radius indicating that Betelgeuse is not shedding matter evenly in all directions. The plume's presence implies that the spherical symmetry of the star's photosphere, often observed in the infrared, is not preserved in its close environment. Asymmetries on the stellar disk had been reported at different wavelengths. However, due to the refined capabilities of the NACO adaptive optics on the VLT, these asymmetries have come into focus. The two mechanisms that could cause such asymmetrical mass loss were large-scale convection cells or polar mass loss, possibly due to rotation. Probing deeper with ESO's AMBER, gas in the supergiant's extended atmosphere has been observed vigorously moving up and down, creating bubbles as large as the supergiant itself, leading his team to conclude that such stellar upheaval is behind the massive plume ejection observed by Kervella.

==== Asymmetric shells ====
In addition to the photosphere, six other components of Betelgeuse's atmosphere have now been identified. They are a molecular environment otherwise known as the MOLsphere, a gaseous envelope, a chromosphere, a dust environment and two outer shells (S1 and S2) composed of carbon monoxide (CO). Some of these elements are known to be asymmetric while others overlap.

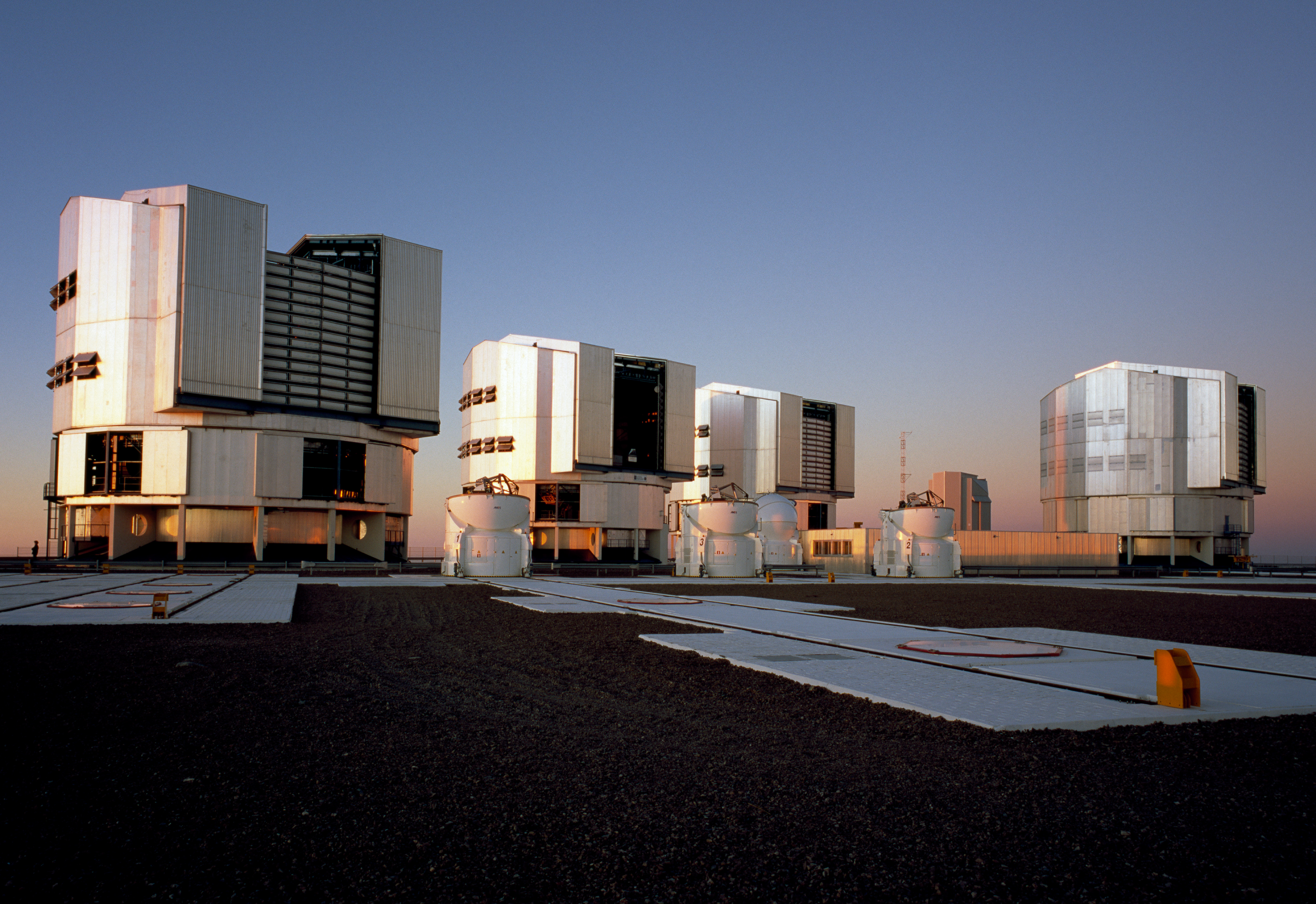
Exterior view of ESO's Very Large Telescope (VLT) in Paranal, Chile

Betelgeuse is surrounded by a shell extending out to a distance at least equal to 0.33 times the star's radius with a temperature of 2,055±25 K. This outer shell appears to contain molecular gases such as CO, H_{2}O, and SiO. At about 0.45 stellar radii (~2–3 AU) above the photosphere, there may lie a molecular layer known as the MOLsphere or molecular environment. Studies show it to be composed of water vapor and carbon monoxide with an effective temperature of about 1,500±500 K. Water vapor had been originally detected in the supergiant's spectrum in the 1960s with the two Stratoscope projects but had been ignored for decades. The MOLsphere may also contain SiO and Al_{2}O_{3}—molecules which could explain the formation of dust particles.

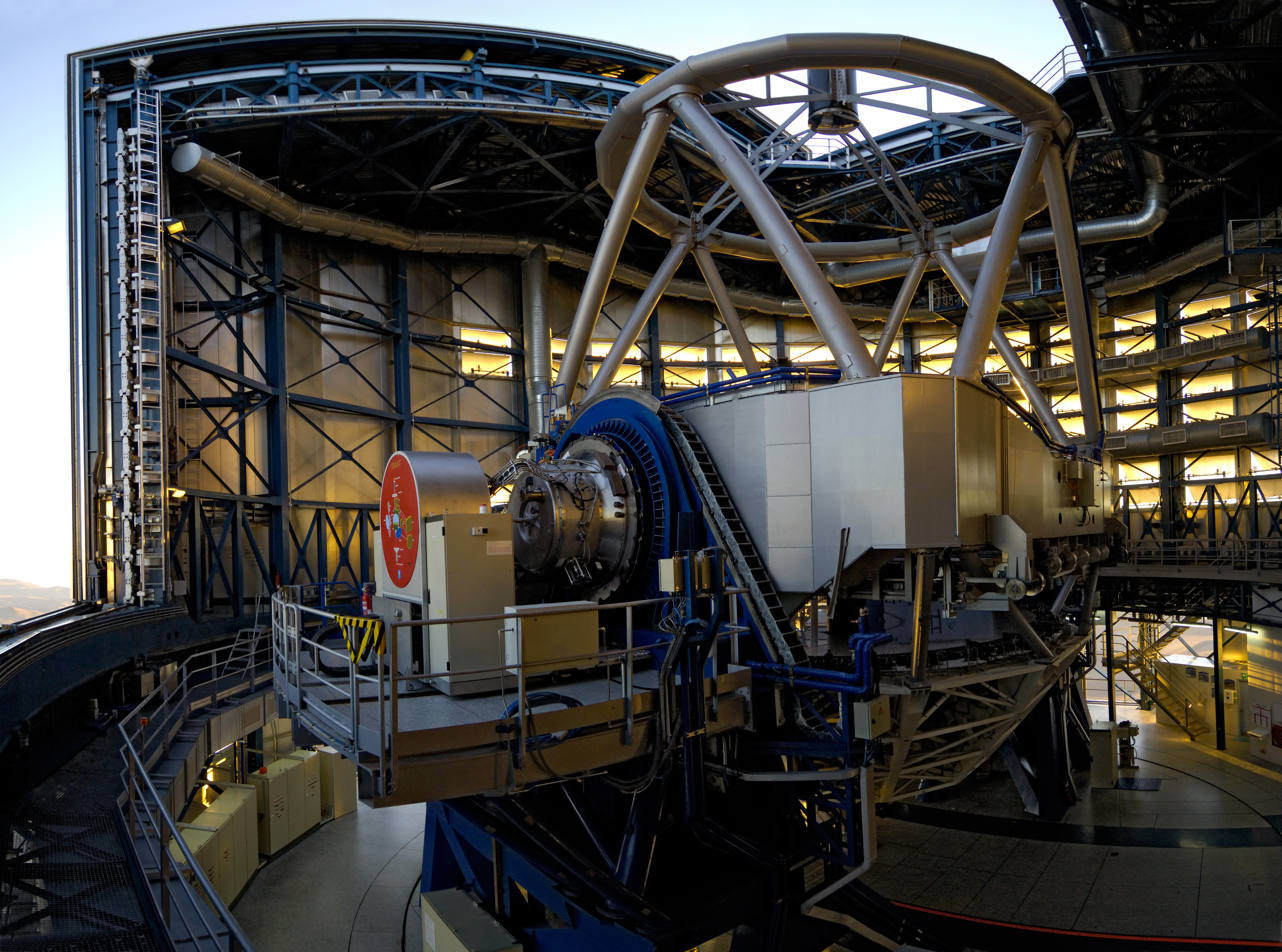
Interior view of one of the four 8.2-meter Unit Telescopes at ESO's VLT

Another cooler region, the asymmetric gaseous envelope, extends for several radii (~10–40 AU) from the photosphere. It is enriched in oxygen and especially in nitrogen relative to carbon. These composition anomalies are likely caused by contamination by CNO-processed material from the inside of Betelgeuse.

Radio-telescope images taken in 1998 confirm that Betelgeuse has a highly complex atmosphere, with a temperature of 3,450±850 K, similar to that recorded on the star's surface but much lower than surrounding gas in the same region. The VLA images also show this lower-temperature gas progressively cools as it extends outward. Although unexpected, it turns out to be the most abundant constituent of Betelgeuse's atmosphere. "This alters our basic understanding of red-supergiant star atmospheres", explained Jeremy Lim, the team's leader. "Instead of the star's atmosphere expanding uniformly due to gas heated to high temperatures near its surface, it now appears that several giant convection cells propel gas from the star's surface into its atmosphere." This is the same region in which Kervella's 2009 finding of a bright plume, possibly containing carbon and nitrogen and extending at least six photospheric radii in the southwest direction of the star, is believed to exist.

The chromosphere was directly imaged by the Faint Object Camera on board the Hubble Space Telescope in ultraviolet wavelengths. The images also revealed a bright area in the southwest quadrant of the disk. The average radius of the chromosphere in 1996 was about 2.2 times the optical disk (~10 AU) and was reported to have a temperature no higher than 5,500 K. (Note: "Such a major single feature is distinctly different from scattered smaller regions of activity typically found on the Sun although the strong ultraviolet flux enhancement is characteristic of stellar magnetic activity. This inhomogeneity may be caused by a large scale convection cell or result from global pulsations and shock structures that heat the chromosphere.") However, in 2004 observations with the STIS, Hubble's high-precision spectrometer, pointed to the existence of warm chromospheric plasma at least one arcsecond away from the star. At a distance of 197 pc, the size of the chromosphere could be up to 200 AU. (Note: "In the article, Lobel et al. equate 1 arcsecond to approximately 40 stellar radii, a calculation which in 2004 likely assumed a Hipparcos distance of 131 pc (430 ly) and a photospheric diameter of 0.0552″ from Weiner et al.") The observations have conclusively demonstrated that the warm chromospheric plasma spatially overlaps and co-exists with cool gas in Betelgeuse's gaseous envelope as well as with the dust in its circumstellar dust shells.

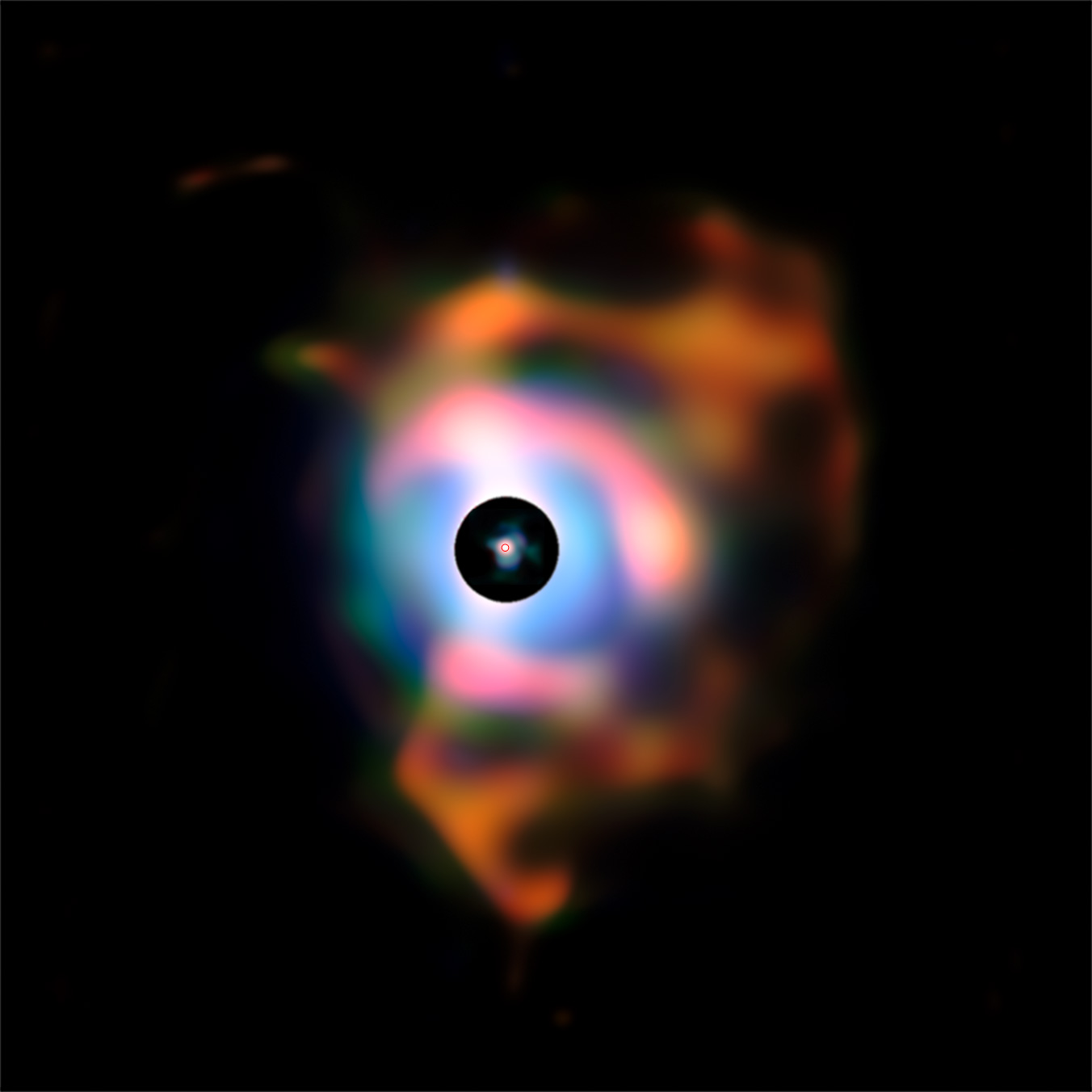
This infrared image from the ESO's VLT shows complex shells of gas and dust around Betelgeuse – the tiny red circle in the middle is the size of the photosphere.

The first claim of a dust shell surrounding Betelgeuse was put forth in 1977 when it was noted that dust shells around mature stars often emit large amounts of radiation in excess of the photospheric contribution. Using heterodyne interferometry, it was concluded that the red supergiant emits most of its excess radiation from positions beyond 12 stellar radii or roughly the distance of the Kuiper belt at 50 to 60 AU, which depends on the assumed stellar radius. Since then, there have been studies done of this dust envelope at varying wavelengths yielding decidedly different results. Studies from the 1990s have estimated the inner radius of the dust shell anywhere from 0.5 to 1.0 arcseconds, or 100 to 200 AU. These studies point out that the dust environment surrounding Betelgeuse is not static. In 1994, it was reported that Betelgeuse undergoes sporadic decades-long dust production, followed by inactivity. In 1997, significant changes in the dust shell's morphology in one year were noted, suggesting that the shell is asymmetrically illuminated by a stellar radiation field strongly affected by the existence of photospheric hotspots. The 1984 report of a giant asymmetric dust shell 1 pc (206,265 AU) has not been corroborated by recent studies, although another published the same year said that three dust shells were found extending four light-years from one side of the decaying star, suggesting that Betelgeuse sheds its outer layers as it moves.

Although the exact size of the two outer CO shells remains elusive, preliminary estimates suggest that one shell extends from about 1.5 to 4.0 arcseconds and the other expands as far as 7.0 arcseconds. Assuming the Jovian orbit of 5.5 AU as the star radius, the inner shell would extend roughly 50 to 150 stellar radii (~300 to 800 AU) with the outer one as far as 250 stellar radii (~1,400 AU). The Sun's heliopause is estimated at 100 AU, so the size of this outer shell would be almost fourteen times the size of the Solar System.

==== Supersonic bow shock ====
Betelgeuse is travelling through the interstellar medium at a speed of 30 km/s (i.e. ~6.3 AU/a) creating a bow shock. The shock is not created by the star, but by its powerful stellar wind as it ejects vast amounts of gas into the interstellar medium at a speed of 17 km/s, heating the material surrounding the star, thereby making it visible in infrared light. Because Betelgeuse is so bright, it was only in 1997 that the bow shock was first imaged. The cometary structure is estimated to be at least one parsec wide, assuming a distance of 643 light-years. (Note: "Noriega in 1997 estimated the size to be 0.8 parsecs, having assumed the earlier distance estimate of 400 ly. With a current distance estimate of 643 ly, the bow shock would measure ~1.28 parsecs or over 4 ly.")

Hydrodynamic simulations of the bow shock made in 2012 indicate that it is very young—less than 30,000 years old—suggesting two possibilities: That Betelgeuse moved into a region of the interstellar medium with different properties only recently or that Betelgeuse has undergone a significant transformation producing a changed stellar wind. A 2012 paper, proposed that this phenomenon was caused by Betelgeuse transitioning from a blue supergiant (BSG) to a red supergiant (RSG). There is evidence that in the late evolutionary stage of a star like Betelgeuse, such stars "may undergo rapid transitions from red to blue and vice versa on the Hertzsprung–Russell diagram, with accompanying rapid changes to their stellar winds and bow shocks." Moreover, if future research bears out this hypothesis, Betelgeuse may prove to have traveled close to 200,000 AU as a red supergiant scattering as much as 3 M_{☉} along its trajectory.

== Life phases ==
Betelgeuse is a red supergiant that has evolved from an O-type main-sequence star. After core hydrogen exhaustion, Betelgeuse evolved into a blue supergiant before evolving into its current red supergiant form. Its core will eventually collapse, producing a supernova explosion and leaving behind a compact remnant. The details depend on the exact initial mass and other physical properties of that main sequence star.

=== Main sequence ===
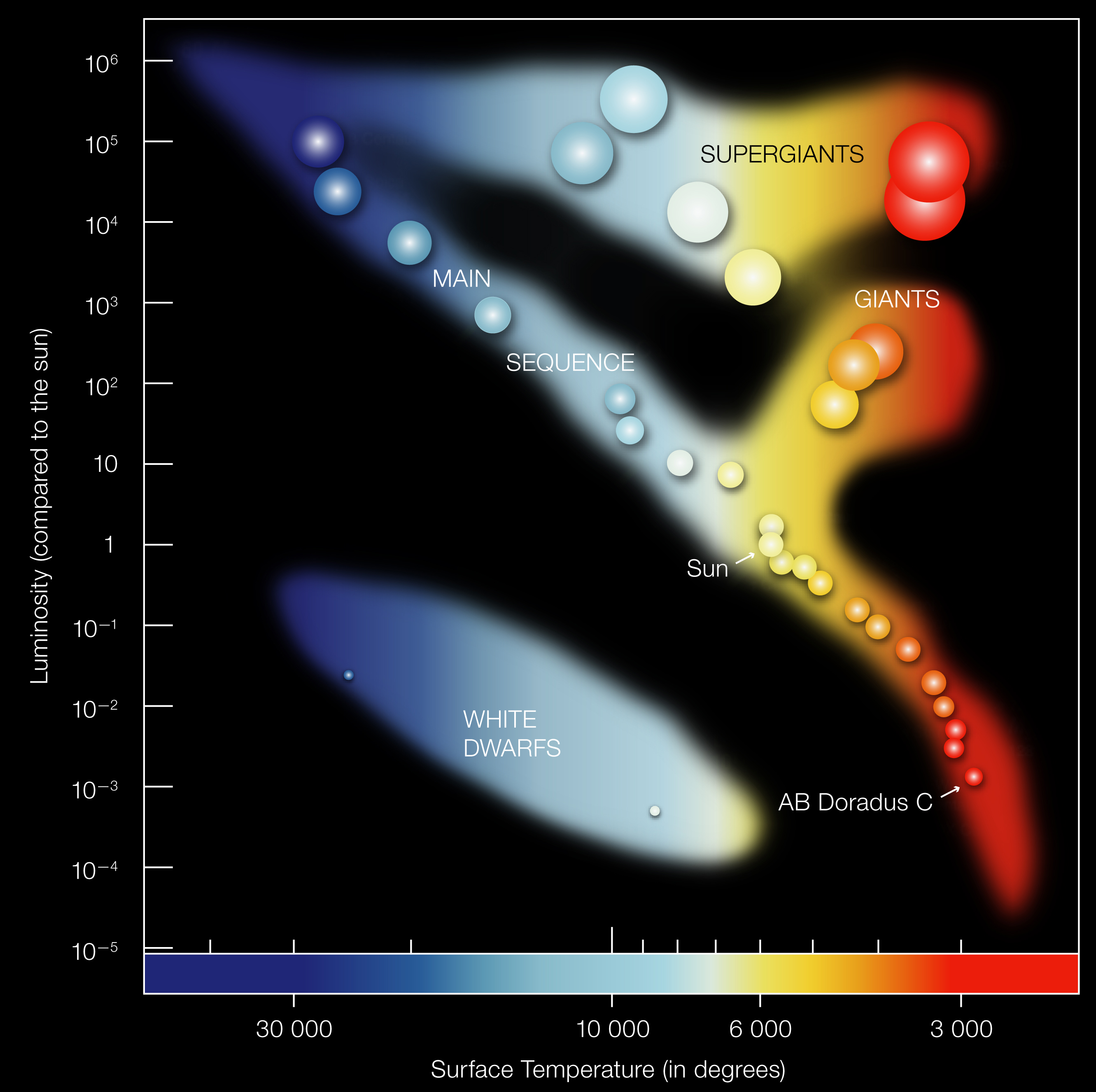
Hertzsprung–Russell diagram identifying supergiants like Betelgeuse that have moved off the main sequence

The initial mass of Betelgeuse can only be estimated by testing different stellar evolutionary models to match its current observed properties. The unknowns of both the models and the current properties mean that there is considerable uncertainty in Betelgeuse's initial appearance, but its mass is usually estimated to have been in the range of 10–25 M_{☉}, with modern models finding values of 15–20 M_{☉}. Its chemical makeup can be reasonably assumed to have been around 70% hydrogen, 28% helium, and 2.4% heavy elements, slightly more metal-rich than the Sun but otherwise similar. The initial rotation rate is more uncertain, but models with slow to moderate initial rotation rates produce the best matches to Betelgeuse's current properties. That main sequence version of Betelgeuse would have been a hot luminous star with a spectral type such as O9V.

A 15 M_{☉} star would take between 11.5 and 15 million years to reach the red supergiant stage, with more rapidly-rotating stars taking the longest. Rapidly-rotating 20 M_{☉} stars take 9.3 million years to reach the red supergiant stage, while 20 M_{☉} stars with slow rotation take only 8.1 million years. These are the best estimates of Betelgeuse's current age, as the time since its zero age main sequence stage is estimated to be 8.0–8.5 million years as a 20 M_{☉} star with no rotation.

=== After core hydrogen exhaustion ===
Betelgeuse's time spent as a red supergiant can be estimated by comparing mass loss rates to the observed circumstellar material, as well as the abundances of heavy elements at the surface. Estimates range from 10,000 years to a maximum of 140,000 years. Betelgeuse appears to undergo short periods of heavy mass loss and is a runaway star moving rapidly through space, so comparisons of its current mass loss to the total lost mass are difficult.

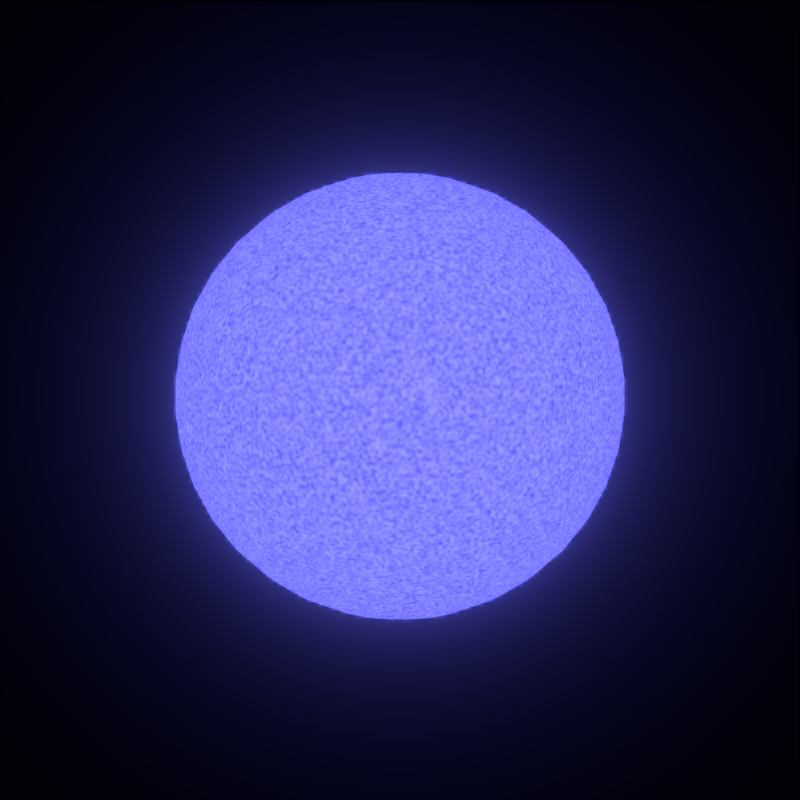
This is what Betelgeuse may have looked like up until about 1 million years ago, when it was a main-sequence star.

The surface of Betelgeuse shows enhancement of nitrogen, relatively low levels of carbon, and a high proportion of ^{13}C relative to ^{12}C, all indicative of a star that has experienced the first dredge-up. However, the first dredge-up occurs soon after a star reaches the red supergiant phase and so this only means that Betelgeuse has been a red supergiant for at least a few thousand years. The best prediction is that Betelgeuse has already spent around 40,000 years as a red supergiant, having left the main sequence perhaps one million years ago.

The current mass can be estimated from evolutionary models from the initial mass and the expected mass lost so far. For Betelgeuse, the total mass lost is predicted to be no more than about one M_{☉}, giving a current mass of 19.4–19.7 M_{☉}, considerably higher than estimated by other means such as pulsational properties or limb-darkening models.

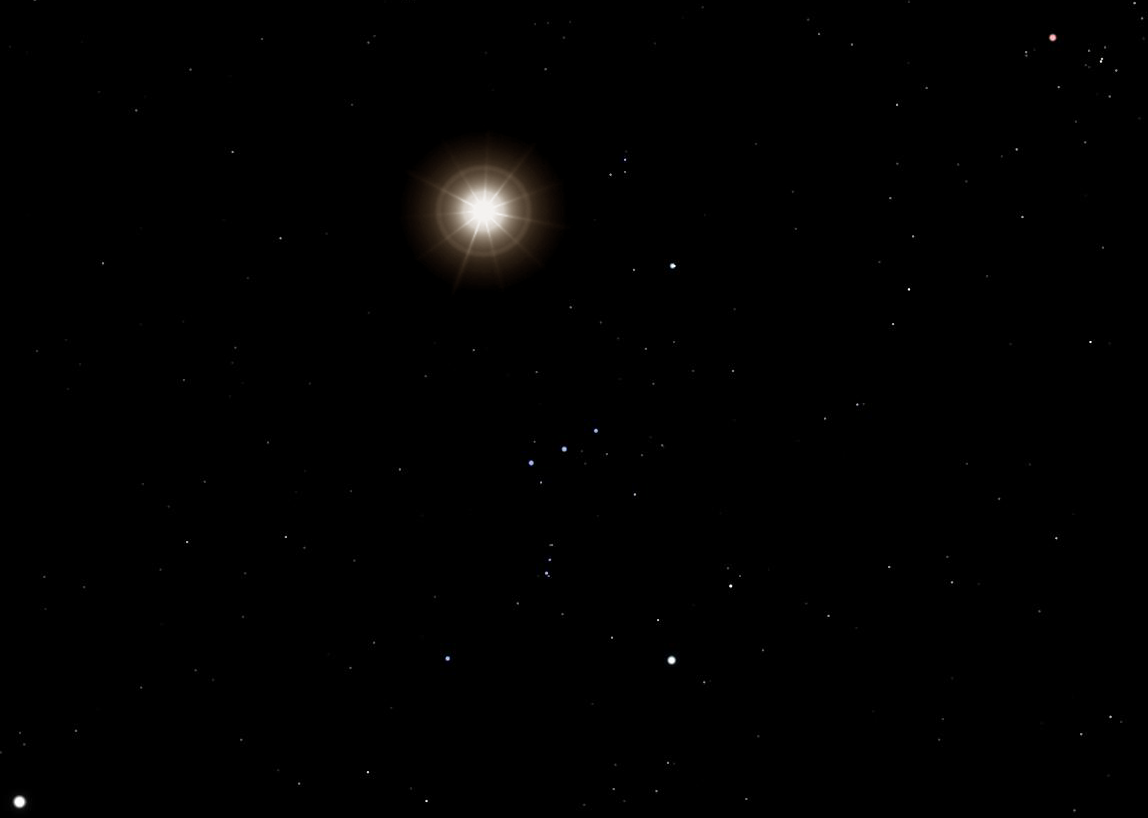
Celestia depiction of Orion as it might appear from Earth when Betelgeuse explodes as a supernova, which could be brighter than the supernova that exploded in 1006 (SN 1006)

All stars more massive than about 10 M_{☉} are expected to end their lives when their cores collapse, typically producing a supernova explosion. Up to about 15 M_{☉}, a Type II-P supernova is always produced from the red supergiant stage.

More massive stars can lose mass quickly enough that they evolve towards higher temperatures before their cores can collapse, particularly for rotating stars and models with especially high mass loss rates. These stars can produce Type II-L or Type IIb supernovae from yellow or blue supergiants, or Type I b/c supernovae from Wolf–Rayet stars. Models of rotating 20 M_{☉} stars predict a peculiar Type II supernova similar to SN 1987A from a blue supergiant progenitor. On the other hand, non-rotating 20 M_{☉} models predict a Type II-P supernova from a red supergiant progenitor.

The time until Betelgeuse explodes depends on the predicted initial conditions and on the estimate of the time already spent as a red supergiant. The total lifetime from the start of the red supergiant phase to core collapse varies from about 300,000 years for a rotating 25 M_{☉} star, 550,000 years for a rotating 20 M_{☉} star, and up to a million years for a non-rotating 15 M_{☉} star. Given the estimated time since Betelgeuse became a red supergiant, estimates of its remaining lifetime range from a "best guess" of under 100,000 years for a non-rotating 20 M_{☉} model to far longer for rotating models or lower-mass stars. Betelgeuse's suspected birthplace in the Orion OB1 association is the location of several previous supernovae. It is believed that runaway stars may be caused by supernovae, and there is strong evidence that OB stars μ Columbae, AE Aurigae, and 53 Arietis all originated from such explosions in Ori OB1 2.2, 2.7, and 4.9 million years ago.

A typical Type II-P supernova emits 2×10^{46} J of neutrinos and produces an explosion with a kinetic energy of 2×10^{44} J. As seen from Earth, Betelgeuse as a Type II-P supernova would have a peak apparent magnitude somewhere in the range −8 to −12. This would be easily visible in daylight, with a possible brightness up to a significant fraction of the full moon, though likely not exceeding it. This type of supernova would remain at roughly constant brightness for 2–3 months before rapidly dimming. The visible light is produced mainly by the radioactive decay of cobalt-56, and sustains its brightness due to the increasing transparency of the cooling hydrogen ejected by the supernova.

==== Media reporting ====
Due to misunderstandings caused by the 2009 publication of the star's 15% contraction, apparently of its outer atmosphere, Betelgeuse has frequently been the subject of scare stories and rumors suggesting that it will explode within a year, and leading to exaggerated claims about the consequences of such an event. The timing and prevalence of these rumors have been linked to broader misconceptions of astronomy, particularly to doomsday predictions relating to the Mayan calendrical apocalypse. Betelgeuse is not likely to produce a gamma-ray burst and is not close enough for its X-rays, ultraviolet radiation, or ejected material to cause significant effects on Earth.

Following the dimming of Betelgeuse in December 2019, reports appeared in the science and mainstream media that again included speculation that the star might be about to explode as a supernova – even in the face of scientific research that a supernova is not expected for perhaps 100,000 years. Some outlets reported the magnitude as faint as +1.3 as an unusual and interesting phenomenon, like Astronomy magazine, the National Geographic, and the Smithsonian.

Some mainstream media, like The Washington Post, ABC News in Australia, and Popular Science, reported that a supernova was possible but unlikely, whilst other outlets falsely portrayed a supernova as an imminent realistic possibility. CNN, for example, chose the headline "A giant red star is acting weird and scientists think it may be about to explode", while the New York Post declared Betelgeuse as "due for explosive supernova".

Phil Plait, in his Bad Astronomy blog, noting that Betelgeuse's recent behavior, "[w]hile unusual . . . isn't unprecedented," argued that the star is not likely to explode "for a long, long time." Dennis Overbye of The New York Times agreed that an explosion was not imminent but added that "astronomers are having fun thinking about it."

Following the eventual supernova, a small dense remnant will be left behind, either a neutron star or black hole. Betelgeuse does not seem to have a core massive enough for a black hole, so the remnant will probably be a neutron star of approximately 1.5 M_{☉}.

== Probable companion star ==
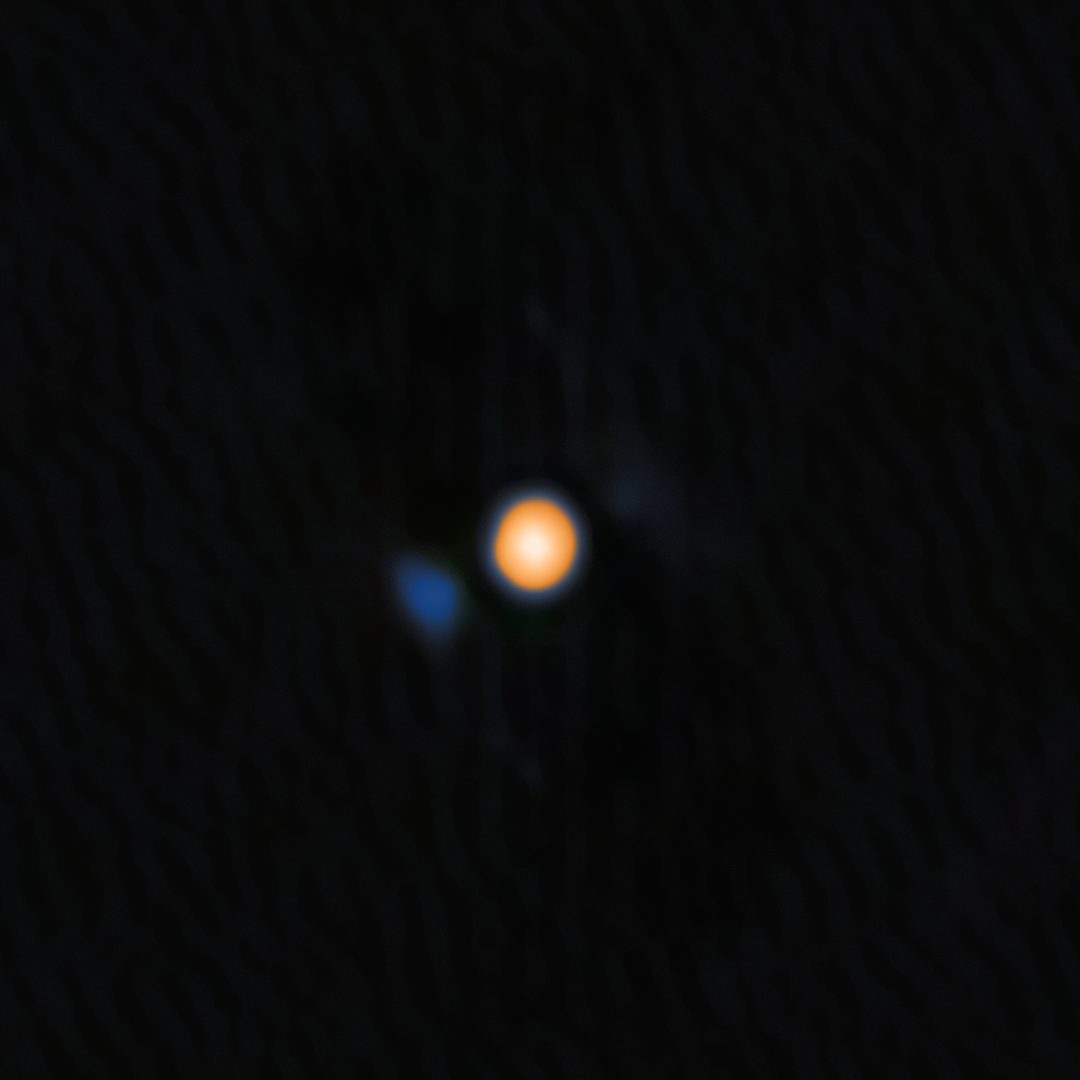
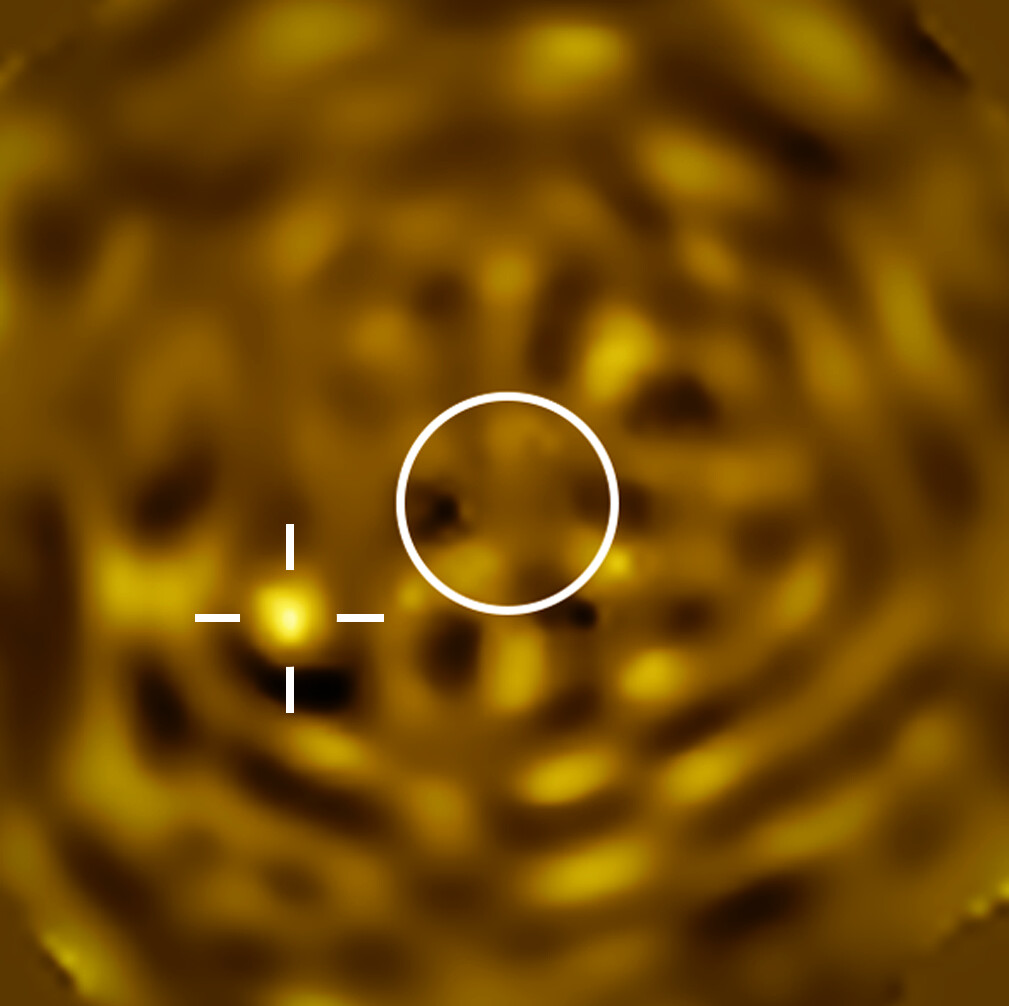
Betelgeuse (center) and its possible companion star (Siwarha, bottom left dot) photographed by the Gemini North telescope (left) and Very Large Telescope (right) in 2024.

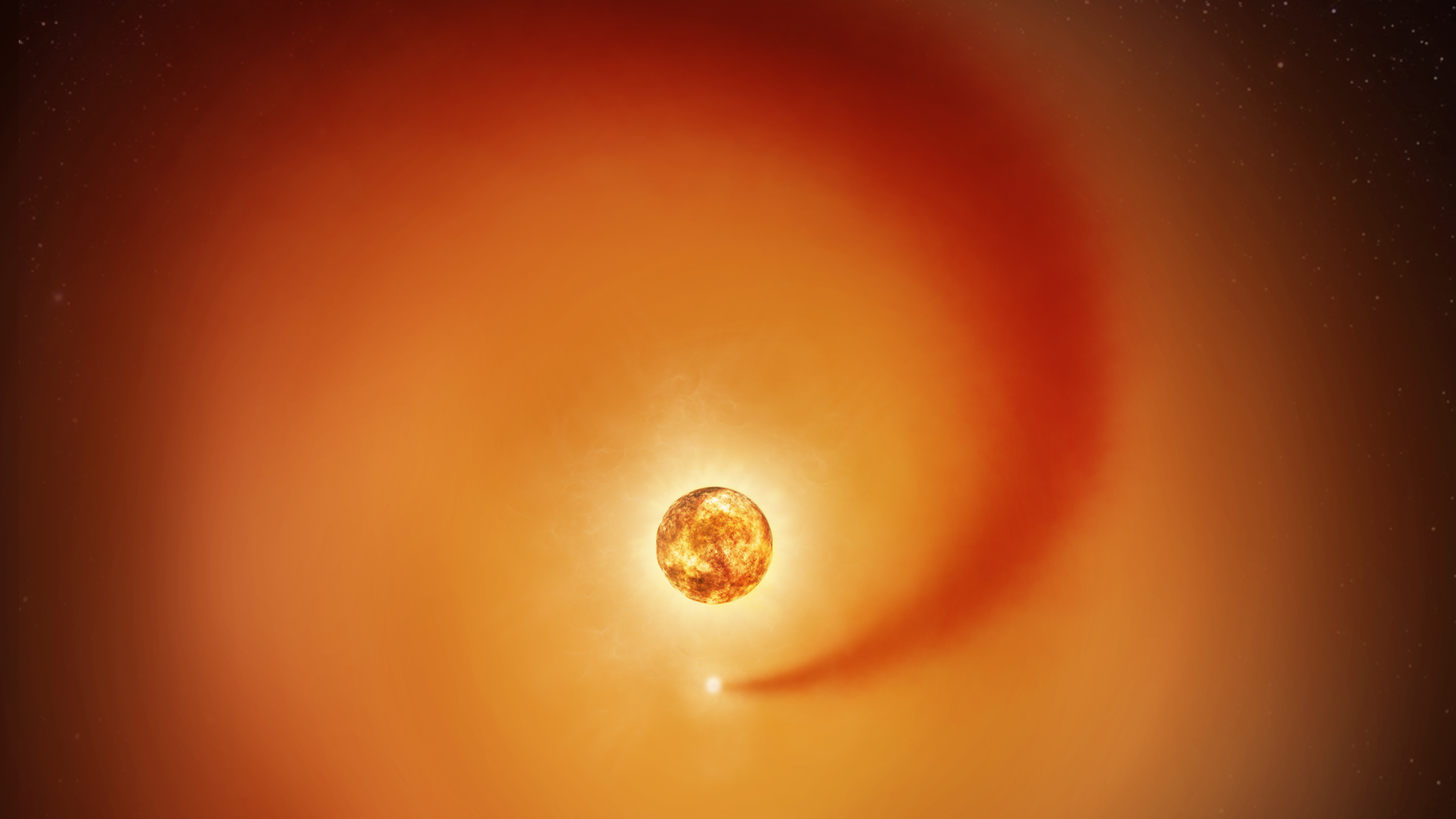
Artist's impression of possible companion star around Betelgeuse (Siwarha) and its wake.

Betelgeuse generally has been considered to be a single star. However, in studies published in 1985 and 1986, a team led by Margarita Karovska analyzed polarization data from 1968 through 1983, which indicated the existence of two companion stars. The closer one had an orbital period of about 2.1 years. By using speckle interferometry, the team concluded that it was located at 0.06″±0.01″ (9 AU) from the main star at a position angle of 273°, an orbit that would potentially place it within the star's chromosphere. The more distant companion was found at 0.51″±0.01″ (77 AU) at a position angle of 278°. Other studies have found no evidence for these companions or have actively refuted their existence, but the possibility of a close companion contributing to the overall flux has never been fully ruled out. In the 2000s and 2010s, advancements in technology allowed high-resolution interferometry of Betelgeuse and its vicinity for the first time, but these attempts did not detect any companions.

In 2024, two studies found evidence for a companion star. One study found that a not yet directly observed, dust-modulating star or compact object of 1.17±0.07 M_{☉} at a distance of 8.60±0.33 AU would be the most likely solution for Betelgeuse's 2,170-day (5.94-year) secondary periodicity, fluctuating radial velocity, moderate radius and low variation in effective temperature. A second study produced by a different group of researchers examined observational data spanning a century, also suggesting a close-in stellar companion, possibly less massive and luminous than the Sun with an orbital period of 5.78 years. It is expected to be engulfed by Betelgeuse within 10,000 years. Jared Goldberg, an astrophysicist researching the phenomenon, nicknamed the companion star "Betelbuddy".

In May 2025, studies based on UV and X-ray observations excluded the possibility that the companion is a compact star, suggesting it is likely a low-mass young stellar object. Such objects have X-ray luminosities comparable with those observed in Betelgeuse. Based on those observations, the mass of the companion should be less than 1.5 M_{☉}, and is more likely less than 1 M_{☉}.

A possible direct detection with the Gemini North Observatory (instrument ‘Alopeke) was announced in July 2025, based on observations made in 2020 and 2024. The 2020 observations were taken during the Great Dimming event, and at a time when the stellar companion was predicted to be unobservable because it was directly in-line with Betelgeuse itself. The 2024 observations were taken three days after the predicted time of greatest elongation for the companion. A comparison of the 2020 and 2024 data revealed no companion in 2020 (as expected) and the probable detection of a companion in 2024. The presumed stellar companion has an angular separation of 52 milliarcseconds and was then positioned east of north, which is in excellent agreement with predictions from dynamical considerations. The detected companion is roughly 6 magnitudes fainter than Betelgeuse at 466 nm. The observations indicate the companion is likely a young F-type pre-main-sequence star with 1.6 times the mass of the Sun, which is larger than expected. At only 1.5 σ significance, this is not a confirmed detection, but it is largely consistent with previous predictions. Since the name Betelgeuse means the hand of al-Jawzā’, the authors proposed the name Siwarha for the probable companion star, which means her bracelet in Arabic. The name Siwarha has been officially recognized by the IAU Working Group on Star Names since 22 September 2025.

Further evidence for a companion comes from spectroscopic observations published in January 2026. Both the absorption from circumstellar dust and the chromospheric outflow were shown to have variations consistent with a predicted passage of Siwarha transiting Betelgeuse. Siwarha's gravitational pull would concentrate the surrounding winds of Betelgeuse, creating a trailing and expanding wake which explains the observed variations.

A July 2026 study reported direct images of Betelgeuse's close surroundings using the SPHERE-ZIMPOL instrument aboard the Very Large Telescope. They detected a point source around Betelgeuse at an angular separation of 52.32±0.18 mas, implying a projected separation of 8.80+1.41
−0.79 au at the distance of 168 parsecs of Joyce et al (2020). The detection was made at 6.1σ confidence, providing strong evidence for the existence of Betelgeuse B. Although the possibility that the detection is an unrelated object is negligible, a second epoch of confirmation is needed to confirm that it is gravitationally bound. If this is the case, the data would suggest that the companion is a B-type main-sequence star with a spectral type between B8.5V and B9.5V and a mass between 2.6 and 3.1 M_{☉}.

== Ethnological attributes ==
=== Spelling and pronunciation ===
Betelgeuse has also been spelled Betelgeux and, in German, Beteigeuze (Note: Likely the result of mistaking the l for an i. Ultimately, this led to the modern "Betelgeuse".) (according to Bode). Betelgeux and Betelgeuze were used until the early 20th century, when the spelling Betelgeuse became more usual. Consensus on its pronunciation is weak and is as varied as its spellings:

- /ˈbɛtəldʒuːz/ BET-əl-jooz – Oxford English Dictionary and Royal Astronomical Society of Canada
- /ˈbiːtəldʒuːz, -dʒɜːz/ BEE-təl-jooz, -jurz – Oxford English Dictionary
- /ˈbiːtəldʒuːs/ BEE-təl-jooss – Canadian Oxford Dictionary and Webster's Collegiate Dictionary

=== Etymology ===
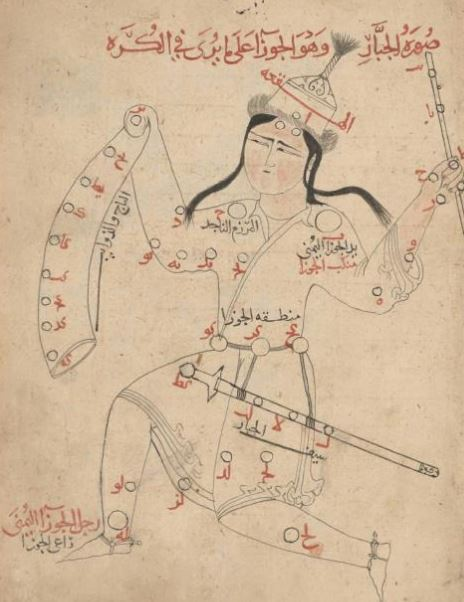
An illustration of Orion (horizontally reversed) in al-Sufi's Book of Fixed Stars. Betelgeuze is annotated as Yad al-Jauzā ("Hand of Orion"), one of the proposed etymological origins of its modern name, and also as Mankib al Jauzā' ("Shoulder of Orion").

Betelgeuse is often mistranslated as "armpit of the central one". In his 1899 work Star-Names and Their Meanings, American amateur naturalist Richard Hinckley Allen stated the derivation was from the ابط الجوزاء Ibṭ al-Jauzah, which he claimed degenerated into a number of forms, including Bed Elgueze, Beit Algueze, Bet El-gueze, and Beteigeuze, to the forms Betelgeuse, Betelguese, Betelgueze and Betelgeux. The star was named Beldengeuze in the Alfonsine Tables, and Italian Jesuit priest and astronomer Giovanni Battista Riccioli had called it Bectelgeuze or Bedalgeuze.

Paul Kunitzsch, Professor of Arabic Studies at LMU Munich, refuted Allen's derivation and instead proposed that the full name is a corruption of the Arabic يد الجوزاء Yad al-Jauzā', meaning "the Hand of al-Jauzā'"; i.e., Orion. European mistransliteration into medieval Latin led to the first character y (ﻴ, with two dots underneath) being misread as a b (ﺒ, with only one dot underneath). During the Renaissance, the star's name was written as بيت الجوزاء Bait al-Jauzā' ("house of Orion") or بط الجوزاء Baţ al-Jauzā', incorrectly thought to mean "armpit of Orion" (a true translation of "armpit" would be ابط, transliterated as Ibţ). This led to the modern rendering as Betelgeuse. Other writers have since accepted Kunitzsch's explanation.

The last part of the name, "-elgeuse", comes from the Arabic الجوزاء al-Jauzā', a historical Arabic name of the constellation Orion, a feminine name in old Arabian legend, and of uncertain meaning. Because جوز j-w-z, the root of jauzā', means "middle", al-Jauzā' roughly means "the Central One". The modern Arabic name for Orion is الجبار al-Jabbār ("the Giant"), although the use of الجوزاء al-Jauzā' in the star's name has continued. The 17th-century English translator Edmund Chilmead gave it the name Ied Algeuze ("Orion's Hand"), from Christmannus. Other Arabic names recorded include اليد اليمنى Al Yad al Yamnā ("the Right Hand"), الذراع Al Dhira ("the Arm"), and المنكب Al Mankib ("the Shoulder"), all of al-Jauzā, Orion, as منكب الجوزاء Mankib al Jauzā'.

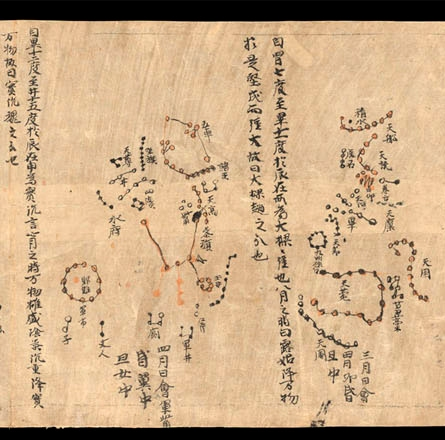
Dunhuang Star Chart, circa AD 700, showing 參宿四 Shēnxiùsì (Betelgeuse), the Fourth Star of the constellation of Three Stars

=== Other names ===
Other names for Betelgeuse included the Persian Bašn "the Arm", and Coptic Klaria "an Armlet". Bahu was its Sanskrit name, as part of a Hindu understanding of the constellation as a running antelope or stag. In modern Indian astronomy however, it is known as आर्द्रा (Ārdrā). In traditional Chinese astronomy, the name for Betelgeuse is 参宿四 (Shēnxiùsì, "the Fourth Star of the constellation of Three Stars") as the Chinese constellation 参宿 originally referred to the three stars in Orion's Belt. This constellation was ultimately expanded to ten stars, but the earlier name stuck. In Japan, the Taira, or Heike, clan adopted Betelgeuse and its red color as its symbol, calling the star Heike-boshi, (平家星), while the Minamoto, or Genji, clan chose Rigel and its white color. The two powerful families fought a legendary war in Japanese history, the stars seen as facing each other off and only kept apart by the Belt.

In Tahitian lore, Betelgeuse was one of the pillars propping up the sky, known as Anâ-varu, the pillar to sit by. It was also called Ta'urua-nui-o-Mere "Great festivity in parental yearnings". A Hawaiian term for it was Kaulua-koko ("brilliant red star"). The Lacandon people of Central America knew it as chäk tulix ("red butterfly").

Astronomy writer Robert Burnham Jr. proposed the term padparadaschah, which denotes a rare orange sapphire in India, for the star.

=== Mythology ===
With the history of astronomy intimately associated with mythology and astrology before the Scientific Revolution, the red star, like the planet Mars that derives its name from a Roman war god, has been closely associated with the martial archetype of conquest for millennia, and by extension, the motif of death and rebirth. Other cultures have produced different myths. Stephen R. Wilk has proposed the constellation of Orion could have represented the Greek mythological figure Pelops, who had an artificial shoulder of ivory made for him, with Betelgeuse as the shoulder, its color reminiscent of the reddish yellow sheen of ivory.

Aboriginal people from the Great Victoria Desert of South Australia incorporated Betelgeuse into their oral traditions as the club of Nyeeruna (Orion), which fills with fire-magic and dissipates before returning. This has been interpreted as showing that early Aboriginal observers were aware of the brightness variations of Betelgeuse. The Wardaman people of northern Australia knew the star as Ya-jungin ("Owl Eyes Flicking"), its variable light signifying its intermittent watching of ceremonies led by the Red Kangaroo Leader Rigel. In South African mythology, Betelgeuse was perceived as a lion casting a predatory gaze toward the three zebras represented by Orion's Belt.

In the Americas, Betelgeuse signifies a severed limb of a man-figure (Orion)—the Taulipang of Brazil know the constellation as Zililkawai, a hero whose leg was cut off by his wife, with the variable light of Betelgeuse linked to the severing of the limb. Similarly, the Lakota people of North America see it as a chief whose arm has been severed.

A Sanskrit name for Betelgeuse is ārdrā ("the moist one"), eponymous of the Ardra lunar mansion in Hindu astrology. The Rigvedic God of storms Rudra presided over the star; this association was linked by 19th-century star enthusiast Richard Hinckley Allen to Orion's stormy nature. The constellations in Macedonian folklore represented agricultural items and animals, reflecting their way of life. To them, Betelgeuse was Orach ("the ploughman"), alongside the rest of Orion, which depicted a plough with oxen. The rising of Betelgeuse at around 3 a.m. in late summer and autumn signified the time for village men to go to the fields and plough. To the Inuit, the appearance of Betelgeuse and Bellatrix high in the southern sky after sunset marked the beginning of spring and lengthening days in late February and early March. The two stars were known as Akuttujuuk ("those [two] placed far apart"), referring to the distance between them, mainly to people from North Baffin Island and Melville Peninsula.

The opposed locations of Orion and Scorpius, with their corresponding bright red variable stars Betelgeuse and Antares, were noted by ancient cultures around the world. The setting of Orion and rising of Scorpius signify the death of Orion by the scorpion. In China they signify brothers and rivals Shen and Shang. The Batak of Sumatra marked their New Year with the first new moon after the sinking of Orion's Belt below the horizon, at which point Betelgeuse remained "like the tail of a rooster". The positions of Betelgeuse and Antares at opposite ends of the celestial sky were considered significant, and their constellations were seen as a pair of scorpions. Scorpion days marked as nights that both constellations could be seen.

=== In popular culture ===
As one of the brightest and best-known stars, Betelgeuse has featured in many works of fiction. Its name inspired the title of the 1988 film Beetlejuice, which refers to the character Beetlejuice; the film's screenwriter Michael McDowell was impressed by how many people made the connection between the character's name and the star. In the popular science fiction series The Hitchhiker's Guide to the Galaxy by Douglas Adams, the character Ford Prefect is from "a small planet somewhere in the vicinity of Betelgeuse."

Two American navy ships were named after the star, both of them World War II vessels, the USS Betelgeuse (AKA-11) launched in 1939 and USS Betelgeuse (AK-260) launched in 1944. In 1979, the French supertanker Betelgeuse was moored off Whiddy Island, discharging oil when it exploded, killing 50 people in one of the worst disasters in Ireland's history.

The Dave Matthews Band song "Black and Blue Bird" references the star. The Blur song "Far Out" from their 1994 album Parklife mentions Betelgeuse in its lyrics.

The Philip Larkin poem "The North Ship", found in the collection of the same name, references the star in the section "Above 80° N", which reads:

"'A woman has ten claws,'

Sang the drunken boatswain;
Farther than Betelgeuse,
More brilliant than Orion
Or the planets Venus and Mars,
The star flames on the ocean;
'A woman has ten claws,'

Sang the drunken boatswain."

Humbert Wolfe wrote a poem about Betelgeuse, which was set to music by Gustav Holst.

== See also ==
- List of stars in Orion
- List of stars that have unusual dimming periods
- Stellar evolution
- List of semiregular variable stars
- List of supernova candidates
