= CX Draconis =

Binary star system in the constellation Draco

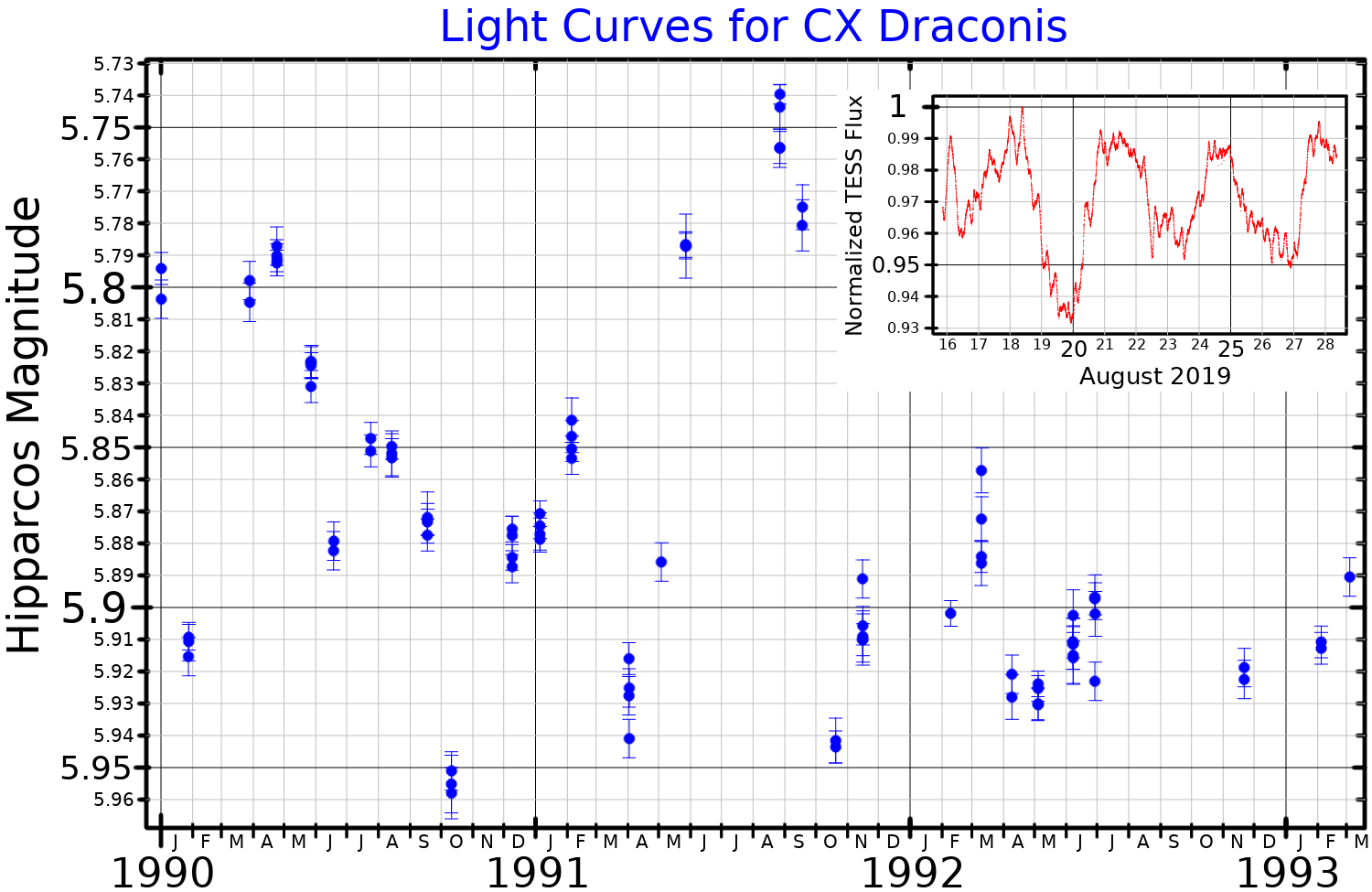
- Light curves for CX Draconis. The main plot, from Hipparcos data, shows the long-term variability. The inset plot, from TESS data, shows how the brightness changes of short timescales.

Observation data Epoch J2000.0 Equinox ICRS
- Constellation: Draco
- Right ascension: 18^{h} 46^{m} 43.089^{s}
- Declination: +52° 59′ 16.65″
- Apparent magnitude (V): 5.68 to 5.99

Characteristics
- Spectral type: B2.5 V + F5 III
- Variable type: γ Cas + rotating ellipsoidal

Astrometry
Radial velocity (R_{v})	−2.1±2.3 km/s
Proper motion (μ)	RA: 10.965 mas/yr Dec.: −4.920 mas/yr
Parallax (π)	2.8262±0.0587 mas
Distance	1,150 ± 20 ly (354 ± 7 pc)

Orbit
Period (P)	6.695957±0.000043 d
Semi-major axis (a)	≥ 3.253 million km
Eccentricity (e)	0.052±0.006
Inclination (i)	52 to 55°
Periastron epoch (T)	2,442,549.48±0.24 HJD
Argument of periastron (ω) (secondary)	267.9±6.4°
Semi-amplitude (K_{1}) (primary)	33.66±0.86 km/s
Semi-amplitude (K_{2}) (secondary)	145.92±0.82 km/s

Details

Primary
Mass	7.3 M_{☉}
Surface gravity (log g)	3.71±0.27 cgs
Temperature	19,580±640 K
Rotational velocity (v sin i)	163±10 km/s

Secondary
Mass	~1.7 M_{☉}
Temperature	6,500 K
Rotational velocity (v sin i)	~65 km/s

Other designations
- CX Dra, BD+52°2280, FK5 1492, GC 25757, HD 174237, HIP 92133, HR 7084, SAO 31165

Database references
SIMBAD	data

CX Draconis is an interacting binary star system in the northern constellation of Draco, abbreviated CX Dra. It has the designation HD 174237 in the Henry Draper Catalogue; CX Draconis is the variable star designation. This is a double-lined spectroscopic binary system with a near circular orbit. The brightness of the system undergoes long-term irregular fluctuations, ranging from an apparent visual magnitude of 5.68 down to 5.99. Based on parallax measurements, it is located at a distance of approximately 1,150 light years from the Sun.

In 1921, this target was found to have a varying radial velocity by J. S. Plaskett and associates. It was shown to be a Be star by O. C. Mohler in 1940, and in 1965 M. Lacoarret studied variations in the hydrogen alpha emission profiles from the target. This system was discovered to be a photometric variable by P. Merlin in 1975. P. Koubský measured the radial velocity variations in 1976, and in 1978 published orbital elements for this binary system with a period of 6.696 days. He found that the variation in emission lines matched the time scale of the orbit, indicating that this is an interacting binary.

Using observations from the Einstein Observatory, in 1984 this system was shown to be an X-ray source by E. F. Guinan and associates. This emission may be coming from the cooler secondary that is phase-locked with the primary and is magnetically active due to rapid rotation. In 1992, J. Horn and associates determined that the secondary component is an evolved F-type giant star. Evidence suggests this star is overflowing its Roche lobe with gas streaming toward the primary.

Models indicate that the main source of the H-alpha emission is located mid-way between the two stars, with other emission lines originating from an accretion disk orbiting the primary. The circumstellar environment is changing in cycles lasting hundreds of days. Infrared emission to the northeast of the system suggests it may be undergoing systematic mass loss.
