= Edward Guinan =

Edward F. Guinan is a professor in Villanova University's Department of Astronomy and Astrophysics. He and two colleagues observed evidence of Neptune's ring system in 1968, which was later discovered by Voyager 2 in 1989. He was also involved in building Iran's first high-powered telescope in the 1970s. He has been, and continues to be, involved in various international astronomical collaborations, such as helping to organize teaching and development programs in North Korea.

He received a B.S. degree in physics from Villanova University in 1964 and his doctoral degree in astronomy from the University of Pennsylvania in 1970. His research interests are binary star systems, pulsating stars, black holes, evolution of the sun and solar-like stars, pulsating red stars, APT (Automatic Photoelectric Telescope) programs, apsidal motion studies, and searching for exoplanets.

More recently, Guinan has been involved with a Mars Garden project, which studies the growth of plants in replicated Martian soil.

He was elected a Legacy Fellow of the American Astronomical Society in 2020.
