= List of stars with resolved images =

The following is a list of stars with resolved images, that is, stars whose images have been resolved beyond a point source. Aside from the Sun, observed from Earth, stars are exceedingly small in apparent size, requiring the use of special high-resolution equipment and techniques to image. For example, Betelgeuse, the first star other than the Sun to be resolved, has an angular diameter of only 50 milliarcseconds (mas).

== List ==
List of stars with resolved images
Star	Image	Diameter		Distance (ly)	First imager	Year	Notes
Star	Image	Angular (mas)	Geometric (R_{☉})	Distance (ly)	First imager	Year	Notes
Sun		1930000±30000	1	0.0000158	Louis Fizeau and Léon Foucault	1845	
Altair α Aql		3.2	1.66±0.01 (polar); 2.02±0.01 (equator)	16.77±0.08	CHARA array – MIRC	2006	
Rasalhague α Oph A		1.62±0.03	2.39±0.01 (polar); 2.87±0.02 (equator)	48.6±0.8	CHARA array – MIRC	2006	
Alderamin α Cep		1.35±0.02 (polar); 1.75±0.03 (equator)	2.20±0.04 (polar); 2.74±0.04 (equator)	48.8±0.36	CHARA array – MIRC	2006	
Caph β Cas		1.70±0.04	3.1±0.1 (polar); 3.8±0.1 (equator)	54.7±0.3	CHARA array – MIRC	2007	
Regulus α Leo Aa		1.24±0.02	3.2±0.1 (polar); 4.2±0.1 (equator)	79.3±0.7	CHARA array – MIRC	2008	
Algol β Per Aa1		0.88±0.05	4.13	93±2	CHARA array – MIRC	2006	stationary object in the animation
β Per Aa2		1.12±0.07	3	93±2	CHARA array – MIRC	2006	orbiting object in the animation
β Per Ab		0.56±0.10	0.9	93±2			Observed radius of Algol Ab is an instrumental artifact, caused by bandwidth smearing. Actual radius is 1.73 ± 0.33 R_{☉}.
Alkaid η UMa		0.834±0.060	2.86±0.21	103.9±0.8	CHARA array	2012	
σ Gem A		2.425	10.1±0.4	126±2	CHARA array/MIRC	2011	The star contains starspots on its surface
Markab α Peg		1.052±0.066	4.62±0.29	133±1	CHARA array	2012	
Elnath β Tau		1.09±0.076	4.82±0.34	134±2	CHARA array	2012	
ζ And Aa		2.502±0.008	15.0±0.8 (polar)	189±3	CFHT	1996	First direct imaging of starspots on a star outside the Solar System.
R Dor		57±5	370±50	204±9	New Technology Telescope	1993	2nd largest known star by apparent diameter in Earth's sky, after the Sun.
Mira ο Cet A		28.9–34.9	332–402	420	Hubble – FOC	1997	
Polaris α UMi Aa		3.143±0.027	46.27±0.42	446±1	CHARA array	2024	
T Lep		5.8; 15 for molecular layer	100	500	Very Large Telescope – VLTI/AMBER	2009	
π^{1} Gru		21	370	535	Very Large Telescope – VLTI/PIONIER	2017	First directly observed granulation patterns on a star's surface outside the Solar System.
Antares α Sco A		41.3±0.1	680	553	Very Large Telescope – VLTI/AMBER	2017	
R Car		10.23±0.05–13.77±0.14	400–540	590±40	Very Large Telescope – PIONIER	2014 (Note: Published 2024 based on observations from 2014 and 2020)	
Betelgeuse α Ori		50	640–764	643±146	Hubble – GHRS	1995	First star with a resolved image outside the Solar System.
Sheliak β Lyr Aa		0.46	6	960±50	CHARA array – MIRC	2007	Both Aa1 and Aa2 are visible in the animation.
R Scl		8.9±0.3	355±55	1180±140	Very Large Telescope – AMBER	2017	
θ^{1} Ori C		0.2	10.6±1.5	1400	Very Large Telescope – AMBER	2009	In the image, the right inset is θ^{1} Ori C and the left inset is θ^{1} Ori F.
θ^{1} Ori F					Very Large Telescope – VLTI/GRAVITY	2016	In the image, the right inset is θ^{1} Ori C and the left inset is θ^{1} Ori F.
ε Aur		2.22±0.10	143–358	2000–4800	CHARA array – MIRC	2009	Supergiant with an eclipsing companion surrounded by a massive, opaque debris disk
AZ Cyg		4.05±0.01	911+57 −50	6820+420 −380	CHARA array – MIRC	2011 (Note: First peer-reviewed publication in 2021, based on observations from 2011-2016)	
SU Per		3.53±0.09	1044+31 −21–1139+34 −23	7,250^{+470}_{−420}	CHARA array	2015	
ρ Cas		2.09±0.02	564-700	8150±1630	CHARA array	2024	
RW Cep		2.45	1100±44	11000+4600 −2600–22000+5200 −3300	CHARA array – MIRC-X and MYSTIC	2022	Hypergiant star currently undergoing a great dimming event
HR 5171 Aa		4.1±0.8	1060–1160	11740±1630	Very Large Telescope – VLTI/PIONIER	2014	Eclipsing and potential contact binary yellow hypergiant
WOH G64			800	ca. 160 000	Very Large Telescope – VLTI/GRAVITY	2024	Star is in the Large Magellanic Cloud. First resolved image of star outside of the Milky Way.
V602 Carinae			1,015	ca. 7000	Very Large Telescope – VLTI/PIONIER	2022	

== See also ==
- Doppler imaging which produces maps of the surfaces of stars
- Zeeman–Doppler imaging which maps the magnetic fields of stars
- List of directly imaged exoplanets
- Angular resolution
- Angular diameter
- List of nearest stars
