= AZ Cygni =

Star in the constellation Cygnus

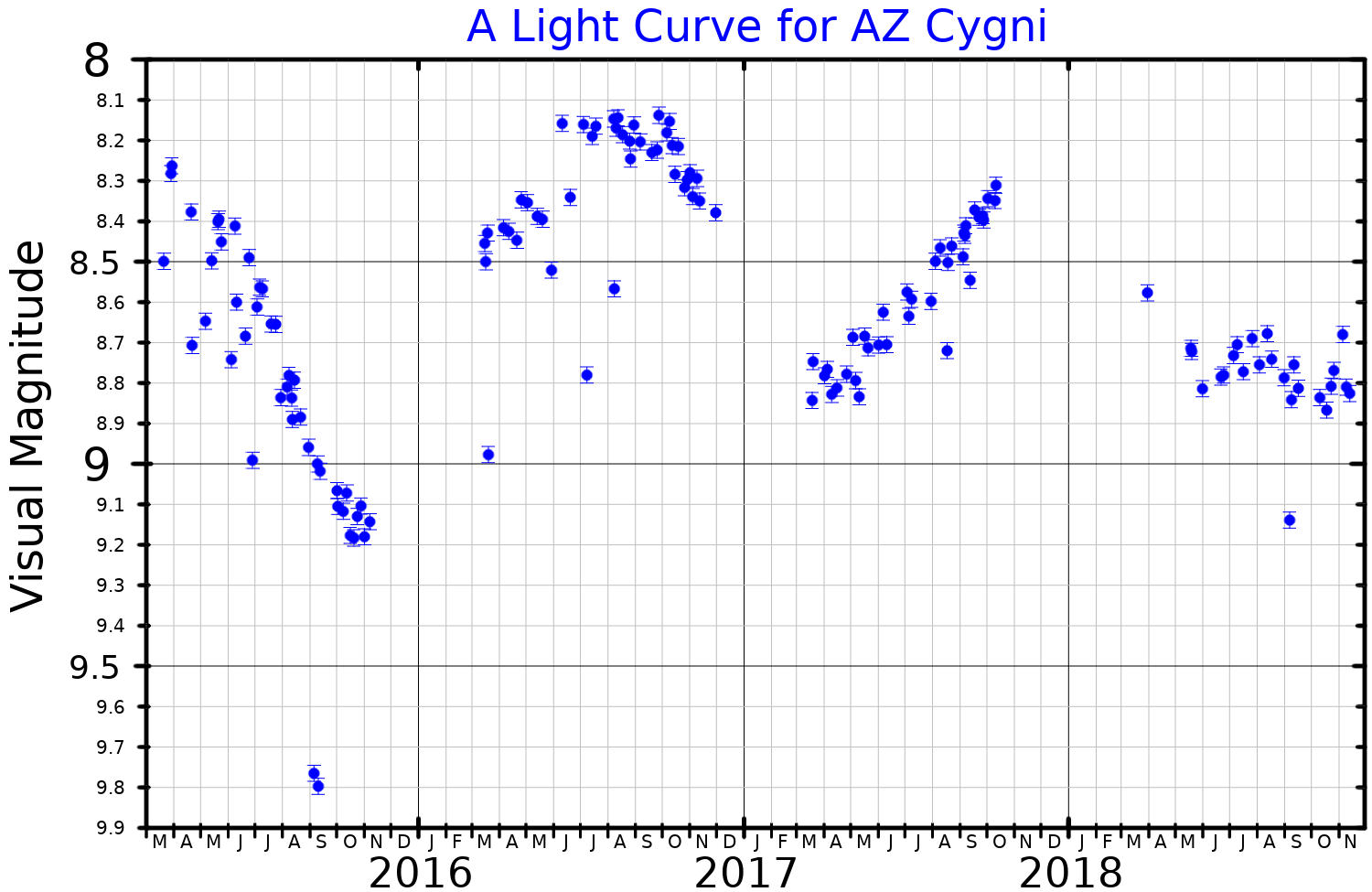
- A light curve for AZ Cygni, plotted from ASAS-SN data.

Observation data Epoch J2000.0 Equinox ICRS
- Constellation: Cygnus
- Right ascension: 20^{h} 57^{m} 59.4444^{s}
- Declination: +46° 28′ 00.583″
- Apparent magnitude (V): 7.8 – 9.6

Characteristics
- Evolutionary stage: Red supergiant
- Spectral type: M3 Iab (M2–4 Iab)
- Apparent magnitude (U): 13.91
- Apparent magnitude (B): 10.897±0.065
- Apparent magnitude (G): 6.190986±0.010832
- Apparent magnitude (T): 4.618±0.018
- Apparent magnitude (J): 2.765±0.234
- Apparent magnitude (H): 1.744±0.164
- Apparent magnitude (K): 1.22–1.288±0.172
- B−V color index: +2.56
- J−K color index: +1.48
- Variable type: SRc

Astrometry
Radial velocity (R_{v})	−5.52±0.99 km/s
Proper motion (μ)	RA: −1.905±0.031 mas/yr Dec.: −2.871±0.029 mas/yr
Parallax (π)	0.4027±0.027 mas
Distance	6,820+420 −380 ly (2,090+130 −115 pc)
Absolute magnitude (M_{V})	–5.32

Details
Mass	15 – 20±9 M_{☉}
Radius	911+57 −50 R_{☉}
Luminosity	109,800(94,800 – 249,400) L_{☉}
Surface gravity (log g)	−0.5 – 0.0, cgs
Temperature	3,989±117 (3,972 – 4,000) K
Metallicity [Fe/H]	0.0 dex

Other designations
- AZ Cyg, BD+45 3349, TYC 3575-553-1, 2MASS J20575942+4628004, SAO 50296

Database references
SIMBAD	data

AZ Cygni (BD+45 3349) is a red supergiant (M3 Iab) in the constellation of Cygnus. Located 2,090 parsecs (6,800 ly) from Earth, it has been studied by the CHARA array in order to understand the surface variations of red supergiants.

== Observation history ==
AZ Cygni was first observed in the observations used to produce the Bonner Durchmusterung catalogue, published by Friedrich Argelander in the mid 19th century. Thomas William Backhouse showed that BD+45°3349 (the 19th-century name for AZ Cygni) is a variable star, based on observations from 1894 to 1904. It was given the variable star designation AZ Cygni, in 1912. It has since been included in many star surveys and catalogues, including the Two-Micron Sky Survey, 2MASS, Tycho-2 Catalogue and Gaia (DR2 and DR3).

From 2011 to 2016, it was observed using the Michigan Infra-Red Combiner (MIRC) at the six-telescope Center for High Angular Resolution Astronomy Array (CHARA array) to investigate the evolution of surface features on red supergiants. These observations were used to derive the fundamental stellar parameters of the star, reconstruct images of the star and test models of 3D radiative hydrodynamics in red supergiants.

Parameters of AZ Cygni derived from CHARA array data
Year of observation	Angular diameter (mas)	Linear radius (R_{☉})	Estimation used
Norris (2019)
2011	3.93±0.01	856+20 −14	LDD
2012	4.26±0.02	927+21 −15	LDD
2014	4.09±0.01	890+21 −15	LDD
2015	4.11±0.01	895+21 −15	LDD
2016	4.09±0.01	890+21 −15	LDD
Norris (2021)
–	3.74	814+175 −124	?
Norris et al. (2021)
2011	3.82±0.01	858+56 −49 (Note: Calculated assuming the given distance of 2,090+130 −115 mentioned in Norris et al. (2021) and the estimated angular diameter. $\delta = 206,265 ~ (d / D) ~ \mathrm{arcseconds} \Longrightarrow d = \frac{\delta * D}{206,265} \Longrightarrow R = \frac{d}{2}$ The average linear radius of 911+57 −50 R_{☉} is the only one mentioned in the paper.)	UD
2011	3.93±0.01	883+57 −51	LDD
2014	3.81±0.01	856+56 −49	UD
2014	4.09±0.01	919+60 −53	LDD
2015	3.9±0.01	876+57 −50	UD
2015	4.11±0.01	924+59 −53	LDD
2016	3.99±0.01	897+57 −52	UD
2016	4.09±0.01	919+60 −53	LDD
Average (UD)	3.85±0.01	865+56 −50	UD
Average (LDD)	4.05±0.01	910+59 −52	LDD

Parameters of AZ Cygni derived from best fitting atmosphere models and model spectra
Model	T_{eff} (K)	Surface gravity (log g)	Radius (R_{☉})	Luminosity (L_{☉})	Mass (M_{☉})	Metallicity [Fe/H] (dex)	E(B – V)
Norris (2019)
MARCS	4,000	0.5	481	53,206	15	0.0	0.76
PHOENIX	4,100	0.0	642	94,614	15	0.0	0.59
SATLAS	3,867	0.36	600	110,495	30	0.0	0.89
Average	3,989±117	0.29±0.26	574±84	82,772±35,173	20±9	0.0±0.0	0.75±0.15
Norris et al. (2021)
MARCS	4,000	-0.5	1,040	249,443	15	0.0	0.56
PHOENIX	4,000	0.0	641	94,759	15	0.0	0.55
SATLAS	3,972	-0.07	700	109,828	15	0.0	0.54

== Physical parameters ==
=== Luminosity ===
The Gaia DR2 catalogue estimated AZ Cygni's absolute bolometric magnitude at −6.4839±0.6427, corresponding to a luminosity of approximately 30,870+13,790
−24,930 L_{☉}. Although the distance is potentially unreliable due to a very high amount of astrometric noise, rated at a significance of 47.4, anything above a rating of 2 is 'probably significant'.

A paper in 2019 calculated the luminosity of AZ Cygni using the Gaia distance and a bolometric magnitude of -7.58, which would result in a luminosity of around 84,700 L_{☉}. Another paper in 2019 estimated three luminosity values of 53,206 L_{☉}, 94,416 L_{☉} and 110,495 L_{☉} with an average of 82,772±35,173 L_{☉}. According to a 2021 paper, the best fitting atmosphere models would correspond to luminosities of 249,443 L_{☉}, 94,759 L_{☉} and 109,828 L_{☉}.

=== Radius ===
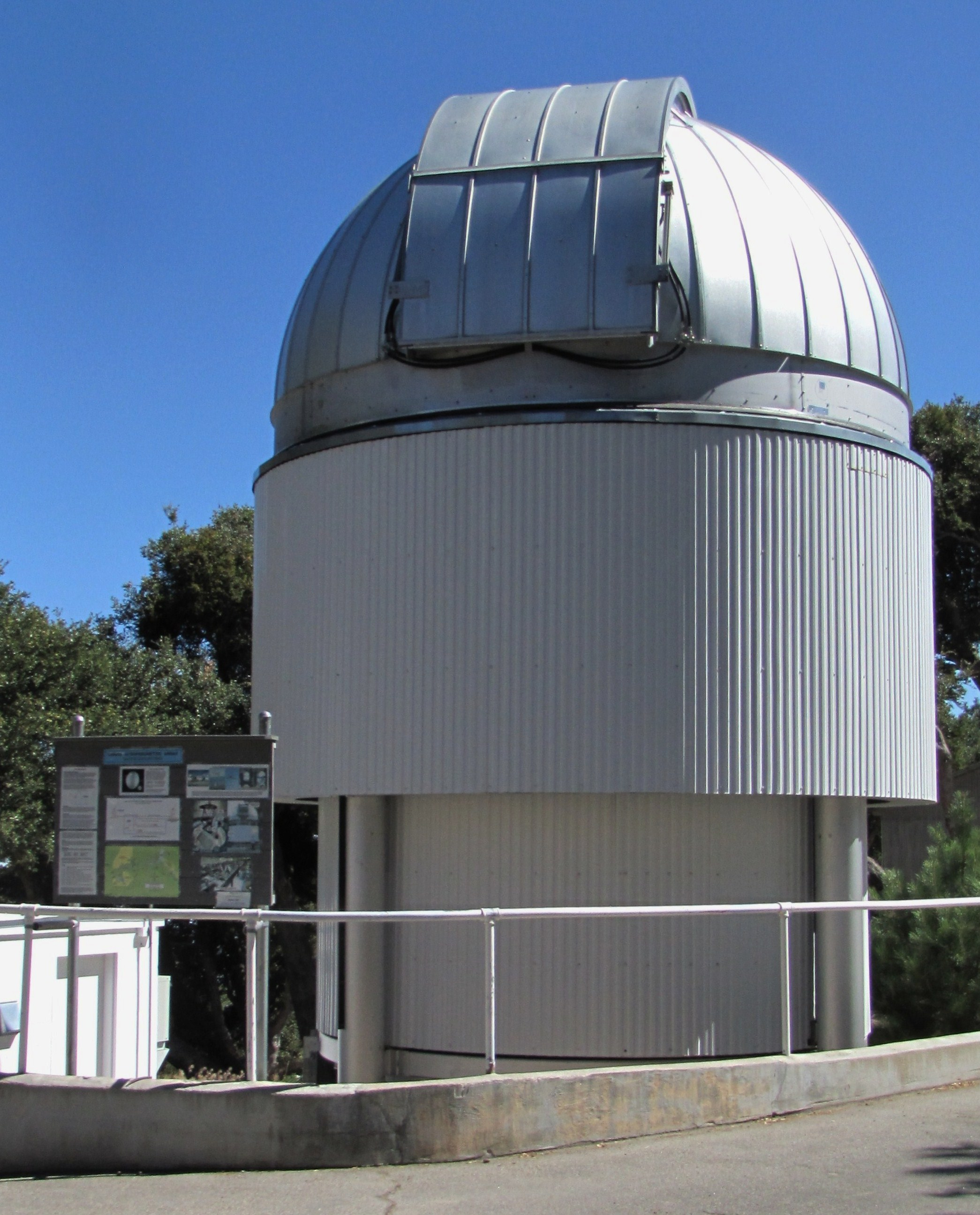
One of six telesopes in the CHARA array, used to derive AZ Cygni's angular diameter.

The radius of AZ Cygni was first determined to be around 748 R_{☉} in a 2019 paper based on the Gaia-derived distance, although it is potentially unreliable due to a high amount of astrometric noise.

By using the angular diameter and Gaia parallax-derived distance in the 2019 Mid-infrared stellar Diameters and Fluxes compilation Catalogue (MDFC), a radius between 913 R_{☉} and 920 R_{☉} can be derived. Another paper in 2019 estimated five different radii from observations between 2011 and 2016 based on the MDFC angular diameter and Gaia parallax: 856+20
−14 R_{☉} (2011), 927+21
−15 R_{☉} (2012), 890+21
−15 R_{☉} (2014), 895+21
−15 R_{☉} (2015) and 890+21
−15 R_{☉} (2016). The same paper also approximated AZ Cygni's radius based on model spectra, in which three values of 481 R_{☉}, 642 R_{☉} and 600 R_{☉} were estimated with an average of 574±84 R_{☉}.

The radius of AZ Cygni was again estimated at 814+175
−124 R_{☉} based on its angular diameter and Gaia parallax in a 2021 study. A separate paper in 2021 calculated a radius of 911+57
−50 R_{☉}, an average value after using the star's angular diameter and Gaia parallaxes. Based on the best fitting atmosphere models, three different radii were calculated: 1,040 R_{☉}, 641 R_{☉} and 700 R_{☉}.

=== Temperature and spectral type ===
In a 1989 paper it was estimated that AZ Cygni would have spectral types of between M2Iab and M4Iab. A study in 2000 estimated that the spectral type of AZ Cygni is M3.1Iab. The spectral type of AZ Cygni was estimated at M3 Iab in a 2002 paper.

A paper in 2004 estimated that the effective temperature of AZ Cygni is 3,200 K with a spectral type of M3 Iab. AZ Cygni had 3 different effective temperature estimates in a paper in 2019 derived from model spectra: 4,000 K, 4,100 K and 3,867 K with an average of 3,989±117 K. In another study in 2021 AZ Cygni would have three effective temperature estimates based on the best fitting atmosphere models: 4,000 K, 4,000 K and 3,972 K and also mentions that it is an M2–4.5 Iab star. The RSG and Close Stars Catalog (2024) features an adopted mean spectral type of M3 for AZ Cygni based on previous spectral types.

=== Mass ===
The mass of AZ Cygni was first determined based on the best fitting model spectra, which would correspond to three mass estimates: 15 M_{☉}, 15 M_{☉} and 30 M_{☉} with an average of 20±9 M_{☉}. A paper in 2021 estimated three mass estimates equal to 15 M_{☉} based on the best fitting atmosphere models.

== Surface features ==
AZ Cygni has a complex surface, with large and small features that vary over different timescales. Patterns of large convection cells, varying over periods of more than a year, are combined with smaller hot granules of rising gas that vary over shorter timescales. The size of the larger surface features is in line with models of 3D radiative hydrodynamics in red supergiants.

== See also ==
- 6 Geminorum
- BI Cygni
- NR Vulpeculae
- RS Persei
- RW Cygni
- S Persei
- SU Persei
- TV Geminorum
- V424 Lacertae
- List of largest stars
