= NGC 6910 =

Open cluster in the constellation Cygnus

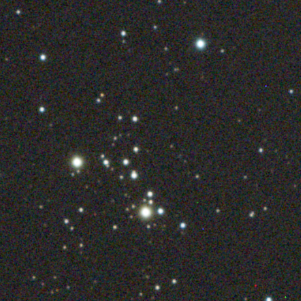
- NGC 6910 seen in 2025

Observation data (J2000 epoch)
- Right ascension: 20^{h} 23^{m} 08^{s}
- Declination: +40° 46′ 30″
- Distance: 3,710 ly (1,139 pc)
- Apparent magnitude (V): 7.4
- Apparent dimensions (V): 10'

Physical characteristics
- Mass: 207 M_{☉}
- Estimated age: 7 – 13 million years
- Part of Cygnus OB9
- Other designations: OCl 181, Inchworm cluster

Associations
- Constellation: Cygnus

NGC 6910, also known as the Inchworn Cluster, is an open cluster in the constellation Cygnus. It was discovered by William Herschel on October 17, 1786. The cluster was also observed by John Herschel on September 18, 1828. It is a poor cluster with prominent central concentration and Trumpler class I2p. NGC 6910 is the core cluster of the stellar association Cygnus OB9.

== Characteristics ==
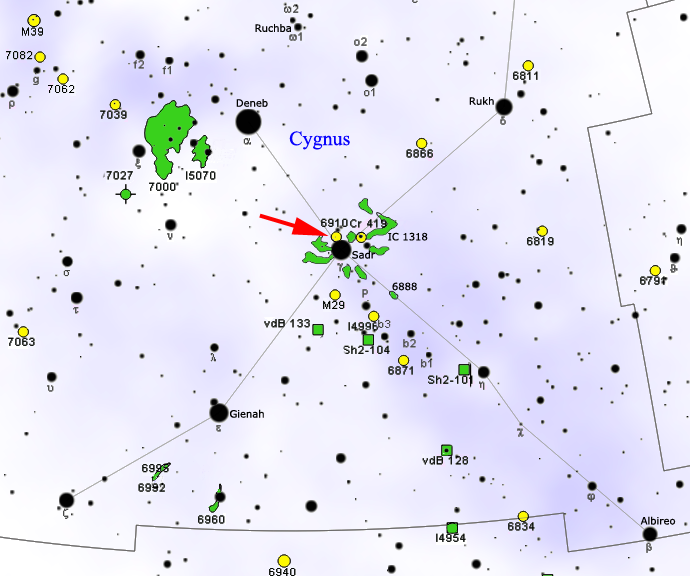
The location of NGC 6910 in the sky

NGC 6910 is located half a degree east-north east of Gamma Cygni, also known as Sadr. It may be physically related with the nebula IC 1318 (also known as the Gamma Cygni Nebula) as it lies at a similar distance, behind the galactic Great Rift. Cygnus OB9 is located within the Orion Arm of the Milky Way. Cygnus OB9's dimensions in the sky are 2.5 degrees by 1.5 degrees, which corresponds at its distance to 175×105 light years across. It includes many OB stars, along with supergiant stars, like the red supergiant RW Cygni. Gamma Cygni is a foreground star, lying at a distance of approximately 1,500 light years. Because it lies behind a number of molecular clouds, the light from NGC 6910 is dimmed by more than one magnitude.

The core radius of the cluster is 0.8 parsec (2.6 light years), while the tidal radius is 4.2 parsecs (13.7 light years) and represents the average outer limit of NGC 6910, beyond which a star is unlikely to remain gravitationally bound to the cluster core. 125 stars, probable members of the cluster, are located within the central part of the cluster, and 280 probable members are located within the angular radius of the cluster. The brightest apparent member of NGC 6910 is a blue supergiant HD 194279 (V2118 Cygni) with spectral type B2 and apparent magnitude 7.0. It is located at the southeast edge of the cluster. It is a variable star with P Cygni profile. A mag 8.1 star lies at the northwest edge of the cluster and a mag 8.5 O6 giant star (HD 229196, also known as V2245 Cygni) lies a bit southwest from the line connecting the two brightest stars. Other members of the cluster include two 10.3 mag stars, one being an O9.5 and the other a B0.5 main sequence stars. The star NGC 6910 37 is categorised based on its emission as a Be star and NGC 6910 14 and NGC 6910 25 are beta Cephei variables. In total there are four beta Cephei variables in the cluster, a rather high number. Their presence has been attributed to the higher metallicity of the cluster.

== Observing NGC 6910 ==
Although visible via binoculars, the cluster is too compact to resolve in low power instruments. Individual stars can be seen with 15×100 binoculars. When seen in low magnification through a 5-inch telescope, the cluster looks like a crescent between the two brighter stars, while more powerful magnification reveals more stars forming streams extending to either side of the cluster.
