= SU Persei =

Star in the constellation Perseus

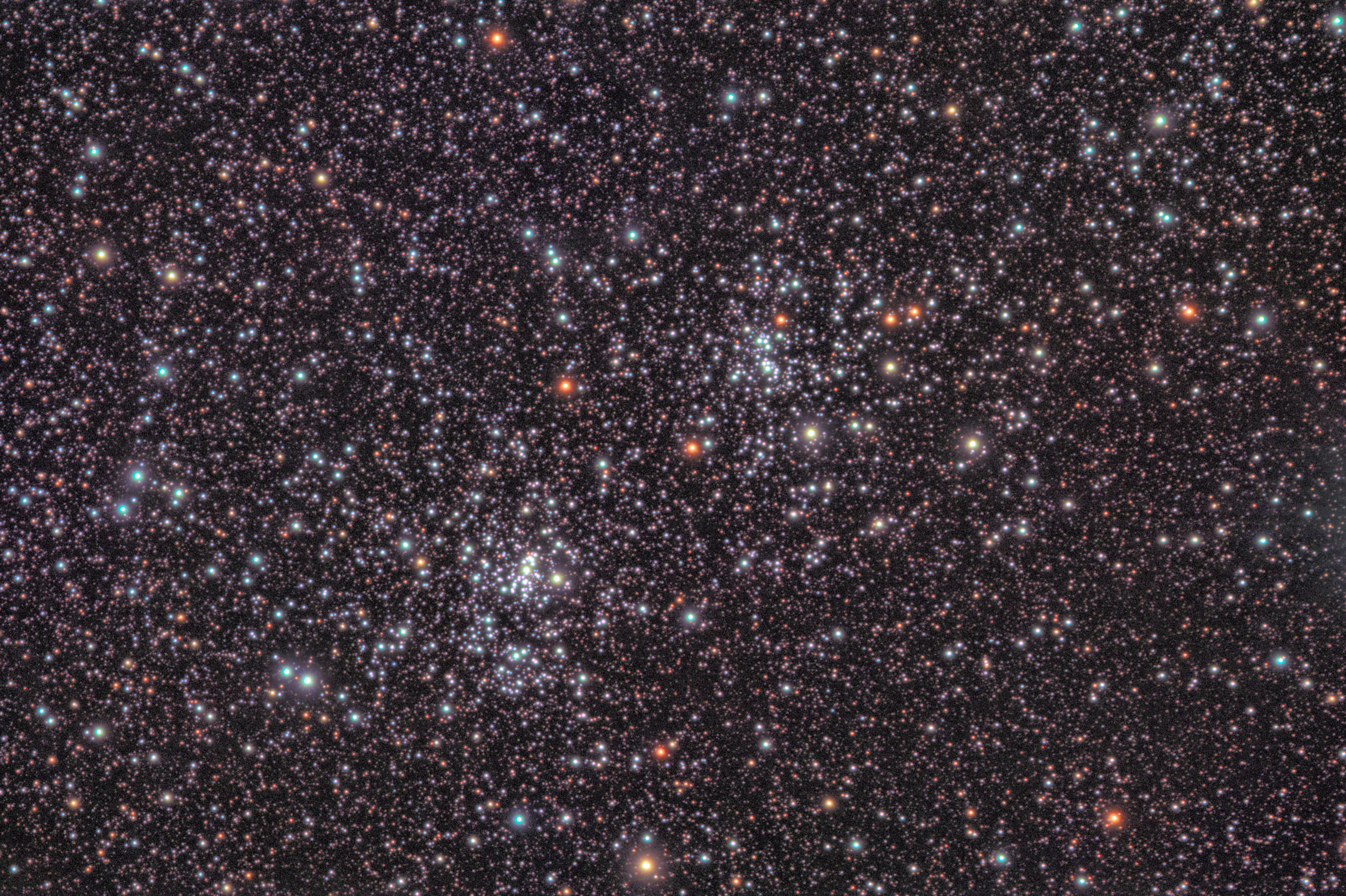
- Location of SU Persei (circled) near the Double Cluster (north is towards bottom right)

Observation data Epoch J2000.0 Equinox ICRS
- Constellation: Perseus
- Right ascension: 02^{h} 22^{m} 06.89^{s}
- Declination: +56° 36′ 14.9″
- Apparent magnitude (V): 7.2 - 8.7

Characteristics
- Evolutionary stage: red supergiant
- Spectral type: M3.5Iab
- Variable type: SRc

Astrometry
Radial velocity (R_{v})	−44.8±0.3 km/s
Proper motion (μ)	RA: −0.765 mas/yr Dec.: −1.204 mas/yr
Parallax (π)	0.4168±0.0279 mas
Distance	7,800 ± 500 ly (2,400 ± 200 pc)
Absolute magnitude (M_{V})	−5.78

Details
Mass	13±4 M_{☉}
Radius	1,044+31 −21 – 1,139+34 −23 R_{☉}
Luminosity	91,201 L_{☉}
Surface gravity (log g)	−0.1 cgs
Temperature	3,650±50 K

Other designations
- SU Persei, BD+55°597, HD 14469, ASASSN-V J022206.86+563614.8

Database references
SIMBAD	data

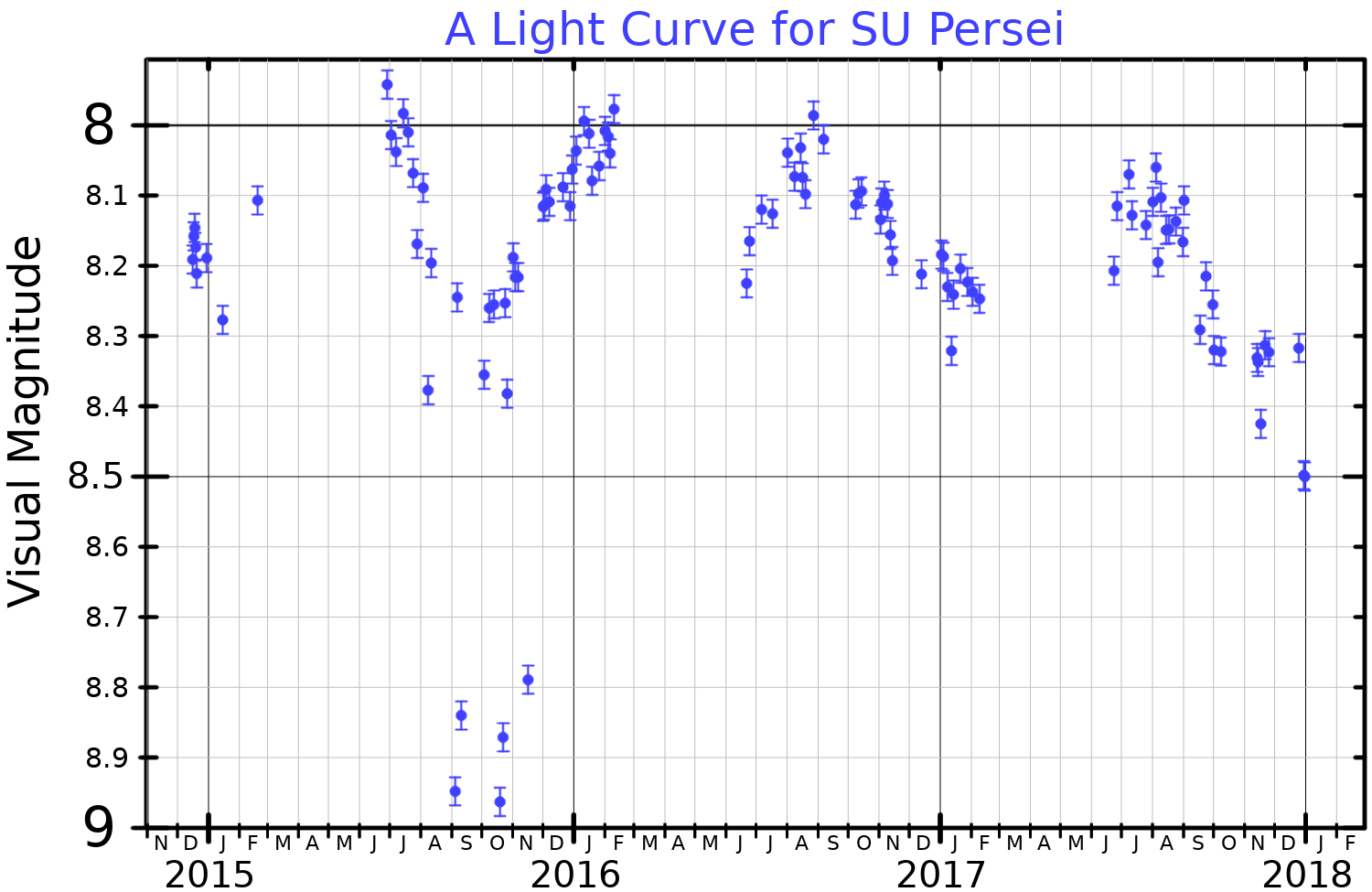
A light curve for SU Persei, plotted from ASAS-SN data

SU Persei is a red supergiant star located in the constellation of Perseus. It is located within the Double Cluster, 7,250^{+470}_{−420} light-years away. It is a semiregular variable star that ranges in brightness from magnitude 7.2 to 8.7, which makes it too faint to be seen with the naked eye, but can be seen with binoculars or a telescope.

SU Persei was imaged by the CHARA array in 2015, 2016, 2019, 2020, and 2021. Observations during 2015 and 2016 with CHARA show that the star has an angular diameter between 3.51 and 3.68 milliarcseconds. Considering its large distance from Earth, this results in a radius between 1,044 and 1,139 times that of the Sun, making it one of the largest stars known.

SU Persei is losing mass at a rate of 1.62+0.72
−0.63×10^{−6} M_{☉} per year, via a stellar wind.

In 1907, Henrietta Swan Leavitt discovered that the star's brightness varies by examining photographic plates. It was given its variable star designation, SU Persei in 1908.

== See also ==
- List of stars in Perseus
- List of stars with resolved images
- AZ Cygni
