= BC Cygni =

Star in the constellation Cygnus

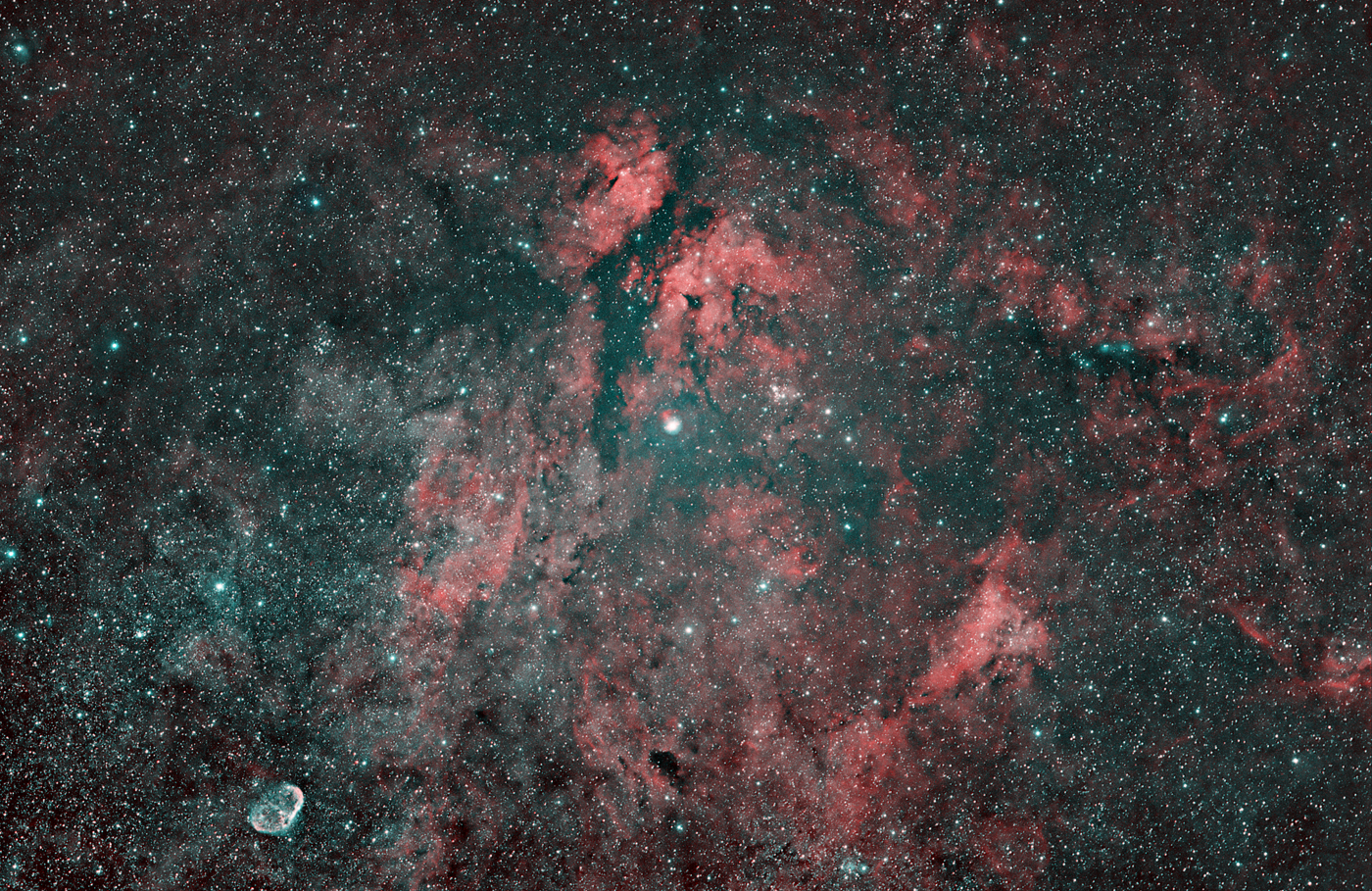
- BC Cygni is visible as a red star (circled). The bright star at the centre is γ Cygni and north is to the right. Credit: Erik Larsen

Observation data Epoch J2000 Equinox ICRS
- Constellation: Cygnus
- Right ascension: 20^{h} 21^{m} 38.55^{s}
- Declination: +37° 31′ 58.9″
- Apparent magnitude (V): 9.0 - 10.8

Characteristics
- Spectral type: M3.5 Ia (M2 - M5)
- B−V color index: +3.13 - +3.21
- Variable type: SRc

Astrometry
Radial velocity (R_{v})	−20.97 km/s
Proper motion (μ)	RA: −3.710 mas/yr Dec.: −6.307 mas/yr
Parallax (π)	0.5760±0.0500 mas
Distance	5,418+470 −430 ly (1,662+144 −132 pc)
Absolute magnitude (M_{V})	−7.71

Details
Mass	19 M_{☉}
Radius	1,187 R_{☉}
Luminosity	150,000; 204,000+159,000 −56,000 L_{☉}
Temperature	3,535 K
Age	>9 (Note: This is only the age at which the star enters the red supergiant phase.) Myr

Other designations
- BC Cyg, BD+37°3903, HIP 100404, IRAS 20197+3722, 2MASS J20213855+3731589

Database references
SIMBAD	data

BC Cygni (abbreviated to BC Cyg), also known as BD+37°3903, is a red supergiant or hypergiant pulsating variable star of spectral type M3.5Ia in the constellation Cygnus.

It is considered a member of the Cygnus OB1 stellar association, and within it the open cluster Berkeley 87, which would place at a distance of 1,673 parsecs (5,000 ly) of the Solar System; it is less than a degree north of another variable red supergiant, BI Cygni. According to its Gaia Data Release 3 parallax, it is at about 1,700 pc.

BC Cygni was found to have a luminosity of 145,000 L_{☉} and an effective temperature of 2,858 K in the year 1900, and a luminosity of 112,000 L_{☉} and a temperature of 3,614 K in the year 2000. It is one of largest stars known, at its brightest and coolest calculated to be 1,553 R_{☉} compared to 856 R_{☉} at its hottest and faintest. If it were in the place of the Sun, its photosphere would engulf the entire inner Solar System and reach close to the orbit of Jupiter. With a mass of about 19 M_{☉}, it is estimated that the stellar mass loss, as dust, as the atomic and molecular gas could not be evaluators is 3.2×10^{−9} M_{☉} per year.

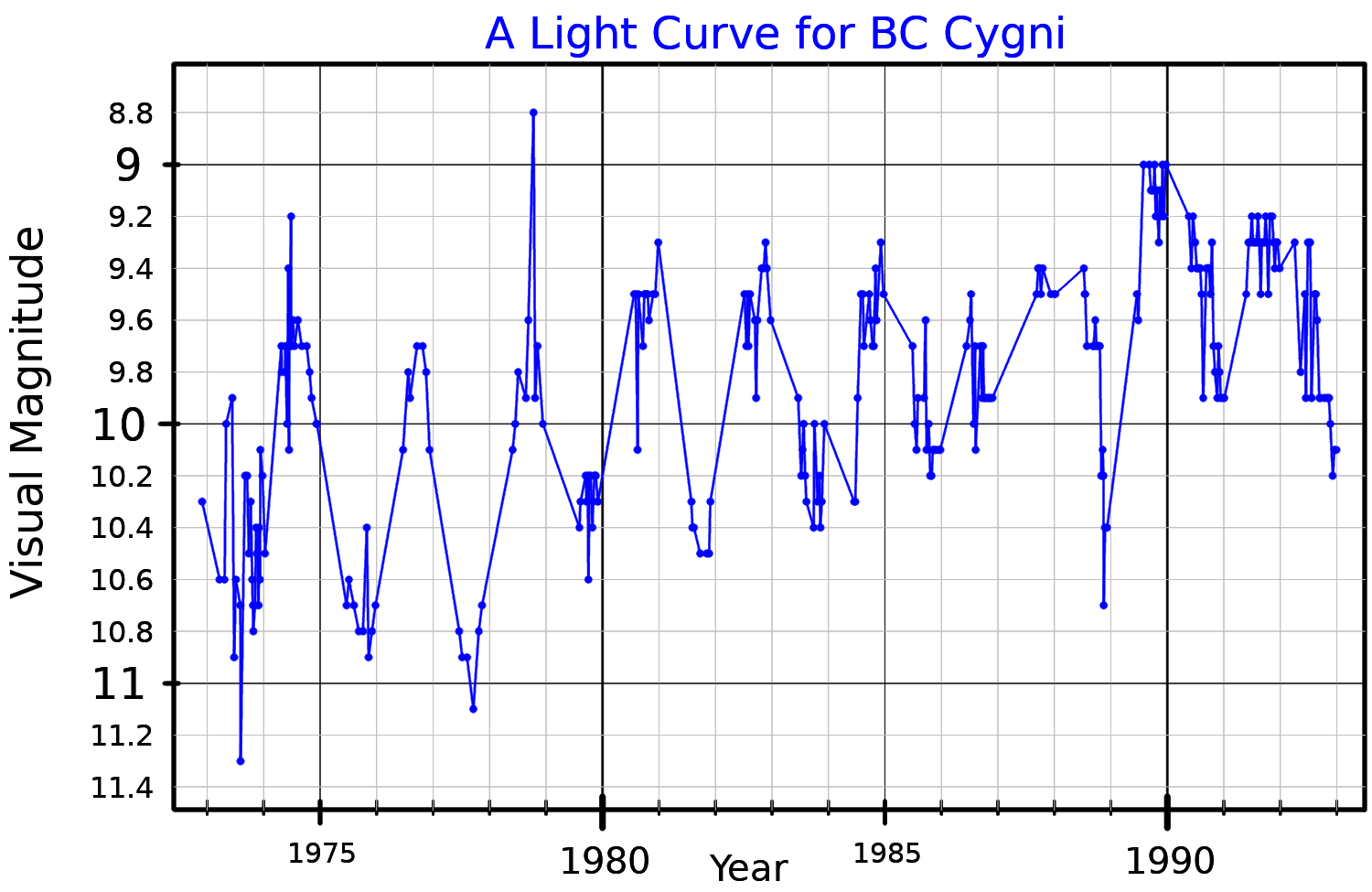
A visual band light curve for BC Cygni, from AAVSO data

Louisa Wells discovered that the star's brightness varied, based on the examination of 15 photographic plates. That discovery was announced in 1911. It was given its variable star designation, BC Cygni, in 1914. The brightness of BC Cyg varies from visual magnitude +9.0 and +10.8 with a period of 720 ± 40 days. Between around the year 1900 and 2000 appears to have increased its average brightness of 0.5 magnitudes.

== See also ==
- NML Cygni
- KY Cygni
- RW Cygni
