= R Doradus =

Star in the constellation Dorado

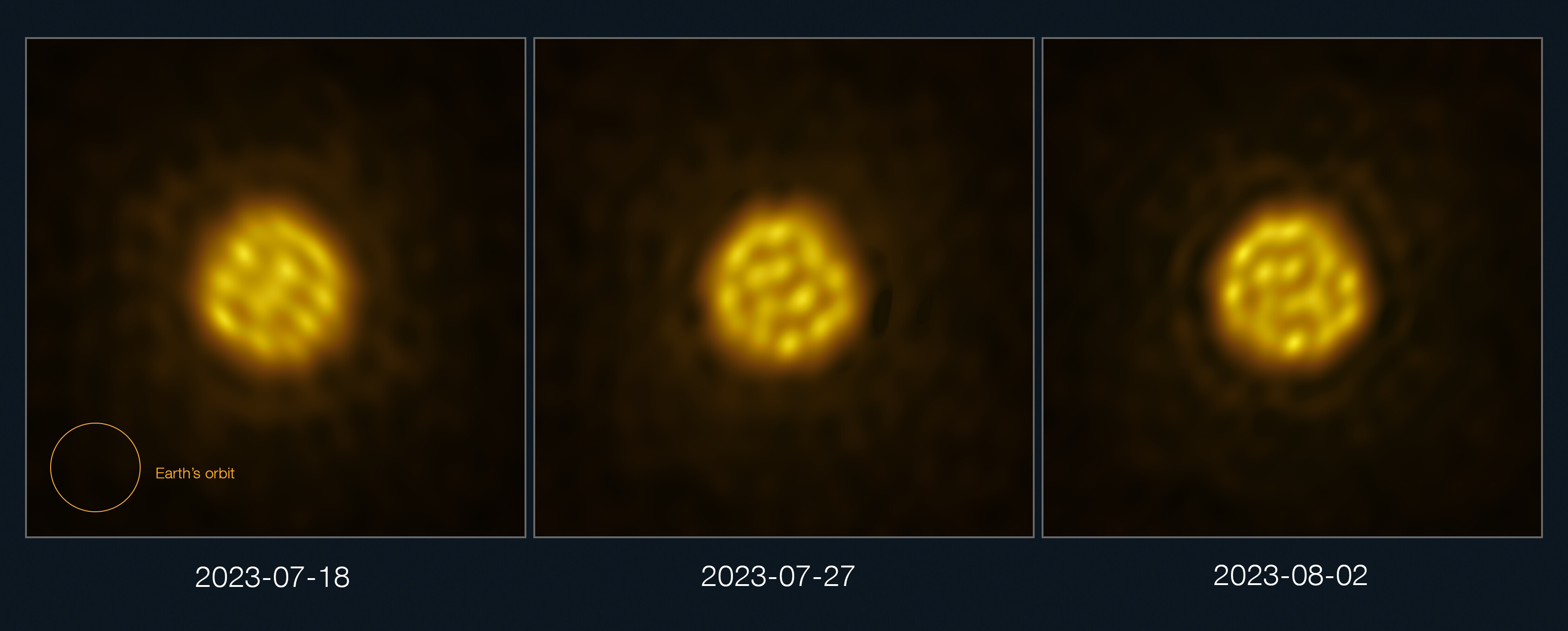
- Resolved images of R Doradus from ALMA

Observation data Epoch J2000 Equinox ICRS
- Constellation: Dorado
- Right ascension: 04^{h} 36^{m} 45.59127^{s}
- Declination: −62° 04′ 37.7974″
- Apparent magnitude (V): 4.78 – 6.32

Characteristics
- Evolutionary stage: AGB
- Spectral type: M8III:e
- Apparent magnitude (J): −2.6
- Apparent magnitude (K): −4.2
- U−B color index: +0.86
- B−V color index: +1.58
- Variable type: SRb

Astrometry
Radial velocity (R_{v})	+26.1 km/s
Proper motion (μ)	RA: −69.36 mas/yr Dec.: −75.78 mas/yr
Parallax (π)	18.31±0.99 mas
Distance	178 ± 10 ly (55 ± 3 pc)
Absolute magnitude (M_{V})	1.61 / 1.90

Details
Mass	0.7–1.0 M_{☉}
Radius	298±21 R_{☉}
Luminosity	4,350±520 L_{☉}
Surface gravity (log g)	−0.6±0.1 cgs
Temperature	2,710±70 K
Rotation	57.5 years
Rotational velocity (v sin i)	1±0.1 km/s
Age	6–14 Gyr

Other designations
- P Dor, R Dor, AAVSO 0435-62, CD−62°175, CPD−62°372, HD 29712, HIP 21479, HR 1492, SAO 249066, PPM 354226, CCDM J04368-6205A, WDS J04368-6205A, GCRV 2726, GSC 08880-01071, 2MASS J04364544-6204379

Database references
SIMBAD	data

R Doradus (HD 29712 or P Doradus) is a red giant variable star in the far-southern constellation Dorado, close to the border with Reticulum. Its distance from Earth is 178 light-years (55 parsecs). Having a uniform disk diameter of 57±5 mas, it is thought to be the extrasolar star with the largest apparent size as viewed from Earth.

== Variability ==
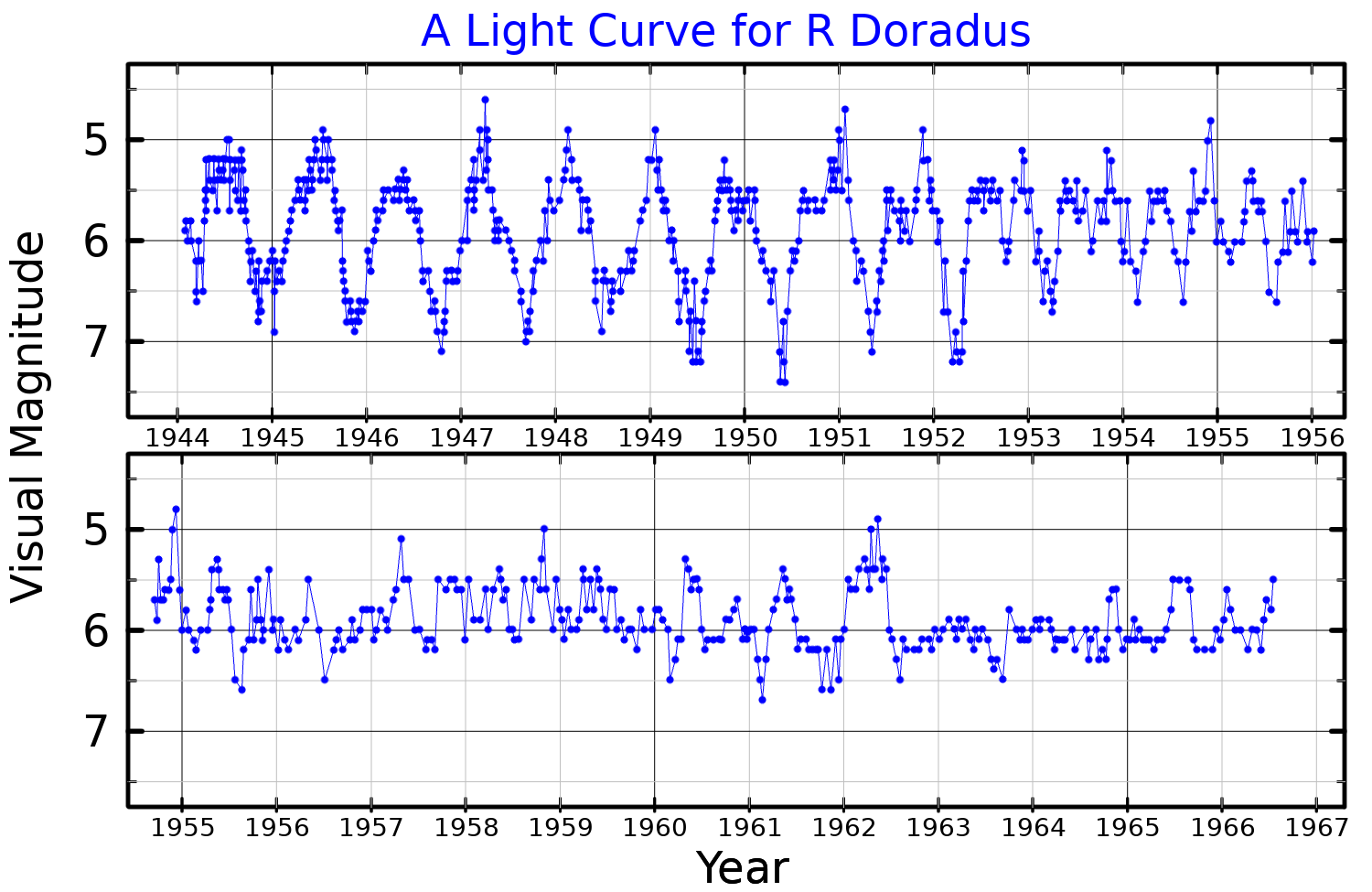
A visual band light curve for R Doradus, adapted from Bedding et al. (1998)

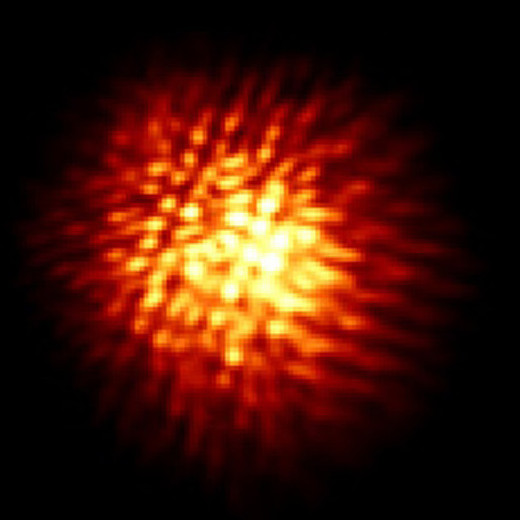
Infrared interferometric image of the star (1997)

The visible magnitude of R Doradus varies between 4.8 and 6.3, which means it is usually visible to the naked eye, but in the infrared it is one of the brightest stars in the sky. With a near-infrared J band magnitude of −2.65, only Betelgeuse and Antares at −2.9 and −2.73 (respectively) are brighter. In the infrared K band, it is sometimes the brightest star in the sky, although usually Betelgeuse is brighter.

It is classified as a semiregular variable star of type SRb, indicating giants with slow poorly defined variations, often alternating between periodic and irregular brightness changes. Some studies show it alternating between periods of about 175 and 332 days, and a period of 117.3 days has also been identified. It has been likened to a Mira variable when its variations are relatively regular, although its amplitude of only 1.5 magnitudes is smaller than Mira variables. The star was discovered to be variable in 1874 by Benjamin Gould, and received the variable-star designation R Doradus.

== Angular diameter ==
The angular diameter of R Doradus is easily measured using interferometry. Its uniform disc diameter, the diameter when interpreted as a disc of uniform brightness, when viewed at 1.25 μm is 57±5 mas. When viewed at 2.3 μm and interpreted as a limb-darkened disc, the diameter is 51.18±2.24 mas.

The angular diameter of R Doradus is larger than any other measured star other than the Sun. The angular diameter of the next-largest star, Betelgeuse, is around 45 mas.

== Properties ==
The Hipparcos parallax of R Doradus is 18.31±0.99 mas, corresponding to a distance of 55±3 pc. The bolometric luminosity of R Doradus, derived from its bolometric flux at a distance of 55 pc, is 4,350±520 L_{☉}. The measured angular diameter, again assuming a distance of 55 pc gives a radius of 298±21 R_{☉}. The angular diameter and bolometric flux of R Doradus derive a cool surface effective temperature of 2,710±170 K.

Comparison of its properties with theoretical evolutionary tracks gives an age of between 6 and 14 billion years. R Doradus has lost part of its mass during its evolution, and currently has a mass of either 0.7 or 1.0 M_{☉}. Its initial mass would be either 1 or 1.25 M_{☉}. Because of the enlarged surface and low mass, R Doradus has a surface gravity of only 0.026% that of Earth. (Note: from a log(g) of −0.6. Should be divided by 980.655 to convert to Earth's gravity.) It is on the asymptotic giant branch having exhausted helium at its core.

The radius of 298 R_{☉} means that the diameter of R Doradus is 415 million km (2.77 AU). If placed at the centre of the Solar System, the perihelion of Mars would be within the star.

R Doradus has a projected equatorial rotation velocity of 1±0.1 km/s. It is calculated to take 57.5 years to rotate once on its axis. While such value is very slow if compared to stars like the Sun, it is more than 100 times faster for a typical AGB star, suggesting R Doradus may have a close companion modifying its rotation.

Using ALMA facilities, researchers at Chalmers University, in July to August 2023, were able to record the movement of hot gas bubbles on the surface of the star. Such bubbles, witness of the convective activity linked to deep nuclear fusion, would have a life of about a month, and a size more than 75 times that of the Sun.

R Doradus figures almost at the western limit of Dorado, next to Reticulum (map to be held, as standard, upwards, with south horizon in front of viewer). Like Alpha Reticuli, which outshines it, it is a little south of a line between the bright stars Canopus and Achernar, as is the narrow kite-shaped asterism of Reticulum.

== See also ==
- List of stars with resolved images
