= TV Geminorum =

Star in the constellation Gemini

- Location of TV Geminorum (circled)

Observation data Epoch J2000 Equinox ICRS
- Constellation: Gemini
- Right ascension: 06^{h} 11^{m} 51.41401^{s}
- Declination: +21° 52′ 05.6452″
- Apparent magnitude (V): 6.27 - 7.50

Characteristics
- Spectral type: K5.5 - M1.3 Iab + B4 III:
- U−B color index: +1.77
- B−V color index: +2.25
- Variable type: SRc

Astrometry
Radial velocity (R_{v})	+20.42 km/s
Proper motion (μ)	RA: −0.575 mas/yr Dec.: −2.598 mas/yr
Parallax (π)	0.3197±0.1301 mas
Distance	1,500 pc
Absolute magnitude (M_{V})	-6.31

Details
Mass	14 M_{☉}
Radius	620 – 710 (pulsation) R_{☉}
Luminosity	62,000 - 89,000 L_{☉}
Temperature	3,500 - 3,850 K

Other designations
- TV Gem, BD+21°1146, SAO 78092, HD 42475, HR 2190, HIP 29416

Database references
SIMBAD	data

TV Geminorum (TV Gem / HD 42475 / HR 2190) is a variable red supergiant star in the constellation Gemini. Its visual magnitude varies from 6.3 to 7.5, making it very faintly visible to the naked eye of an observer with excellent observing conditions, when the star is near its peak brightness.

== Location ==
TV Gem is less than a degree SW of η Geminorum. It is a member of the Gemini OB1 stellar association at around 4,500 light years from Earth.

== Variability ==
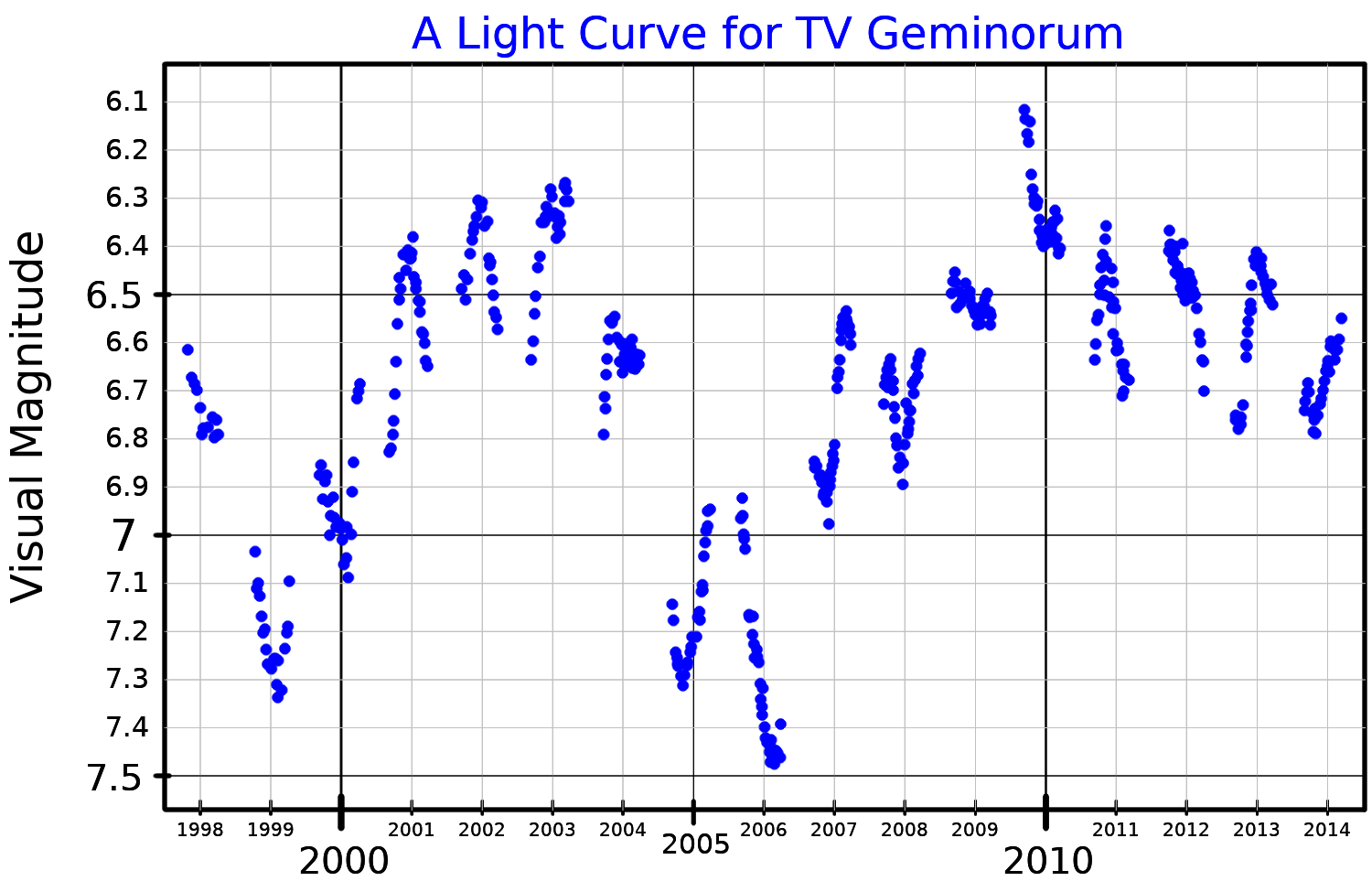
A visual band light curve for TV Geminorum, adapted from Wasatonic et al. (2015)

TV Geminorum is classified as a semi-regular variable star, meaning that its brightness changes are not predictable, but do show some periodicity. The General Catalogue of Variable Stars does not list a period, but the International Variable Star Index gives an uncertain period of 229 days. A detailed study of TV Gem between 1997 and 2014 detects periods of 411 days and 3,137 days.

== Properties ==
TV Geminorum changes its size, temperature, and luminosity as its brightness varies. The temperature changes between 3,500 K and 3,850 K, the radius between 620 R_{☉} and 710 R_{☉}, and the bolometric luminosity between 62,000 L_{☉} and 89,000 L_{☉}. The majority of the electromagnetic radiation is emitted at wavelengths longer than the visual band, being only around 20,000 times brighter than the Sun at visual wavelengths.

The pulsations are not correlated with the brightness changes in the expected way; other pulsating variables are brightest when they are hottest and smallest, but TV Gem does not follow this rule. It has been suggested that the luminosity variations are affected by the formation of supergranules surrounding the star. The spectral type varies in line with the temperature changes, from as early as K5.5 to as late as M1.3. The type M1.3 is assigned by a numerical calculation from photometry. The MK spectral class is M0 - M1.5 Iab.

If TV Gem was at the centre of the Solar System, the four inner planets, including the Earth, would be encompassed within the star. It is losing mass at an annual rate of 3.5×10^{−7}M_{☉}.

== Companion ==
TV Gem appears to have a very close hot companion. Its existence is inferred from an ultraviolet excess in the spectral energy distribution. The spectral type determined from the ultraviolet portion of the spectrum is B4, appearing to be a giant although it is thought that this is caused by the stellar wind from an underlying main sequence star. It is estimated to have an apparent magnitude of 11.2 and an absolute magnitude of −1.4.

== See also ==
- 6 Geminorum
- List of largest stars
