= WISEA J160318.98+031644.8 =

Radio galaxy in the constellation Serpens

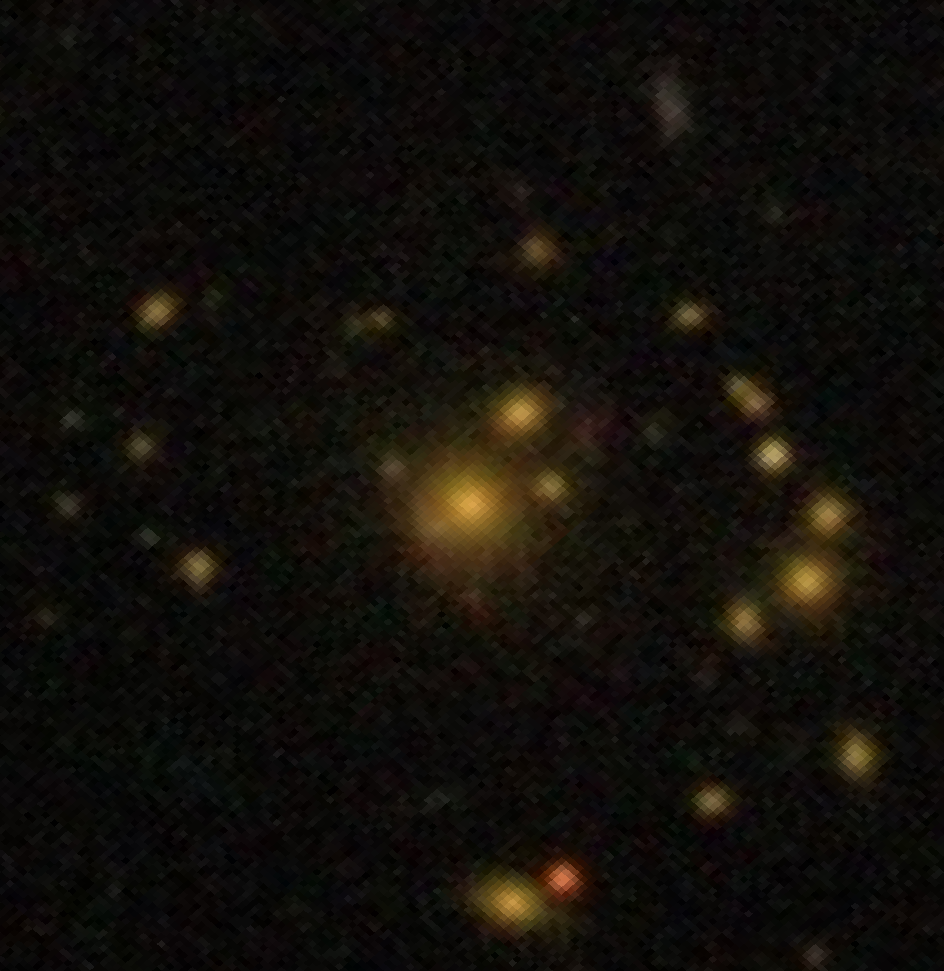
- SDSS image of WISEA J160318.98+031644.8

Observation data (J2000.0 epoch)
- Constellation: Serpens
- Right ascension: 16^{h} 03^{m} 18.98^{s}
- Declination: +03° 16′ 44.87″
- Redshift: 0.222197
- Heliocentric radial velocity: 66,613 ± 20 km/s
- Distance: 3,209.6 ± 224.7 Mly (984.06 ± 68.89 Mpc)
- Group or cluster: WHL J160319.0+031645
- magnitude (H): 13.71

Characteristics
- Type: BrClG AGN
- Size: ~513,000 ly (157.3 kpc) (estimated)

Other designations
- 2MASX J16031902+0316442, OGC 1012, [LHC2018] J240.82913+03.27904, RGZ J160318.9+031644, [VFK2015] J240.82898+03.27854, SDSS J160318.98+031644.5, WHL J160319.0+031645 BCG, LEDA 3360614

WISEA J160318.98+031644.8 also known as OGC 1012, is a radio galaxy located in the constellation of Serpens. The redshift of the galaxy is (z) 0.222 and it was first discovered in a sample of 2,712 radio-loud active galactic nuclei obtained by the Sloan Digital Sky Survey (SDSS) in September 2005.

== Description ==
WISEA J160318.98+031644.8 is a giant elliptical galaxy of type E morphology. It is also a luminous red galaxy found to reside in the center as the brightest cluster galaxy (BCG) of the galaxy cluster, WHL J160319.0+031645 with at least 114 confirmed member candidates. The estimated J-band and H-band infrared color magnitudes of the galaxy is 15.84 and 15.00 magnitudes respectively. The absolute magnitude of the galaxy is -23.42 and it has a total stellar mass of 11.34 M_{☉}.

The nucleus is active and has been categorized as a Fanaroff-Riley Class Type II radio galaxy. The radio flux density calculated by the NRAO VLA Sky Survey (NVSS) at 1.4 GHz frequencies is 127.00 mJy. The radio luminosity is 25.26 W Hz^{−1}.

A study published in 2022, found it is a bent-tailed radio galaxy which can be further classified as a wide-angle tail radio galaxy. The total flux density estimated at 1.4 GHz is 132.94 mJy, while the flux density at 3 GHz is 66.86 mJy. The spectral index between 1.4 and 3 GHz is 0.9α. A radio jet has been detected, with a jet opening angle of 132.8° and a jet curvature radius of 30.8 arcseconds. The radio lobes are resolved, with a flux density of 0.128 Jy and have lobe to lobe separation by 0.002° while the radio core remains undetected. The largest angular size of the galaxy is 34 arcseconds and the largest linear size is 126.0 kiloparsecs.

Evidence also found the source is a double, with an approximate bending angle of 41.3°. The excess bending angle is 34.4°.
