= 57 Pegasi =

Binary star in the constellation Pegasus

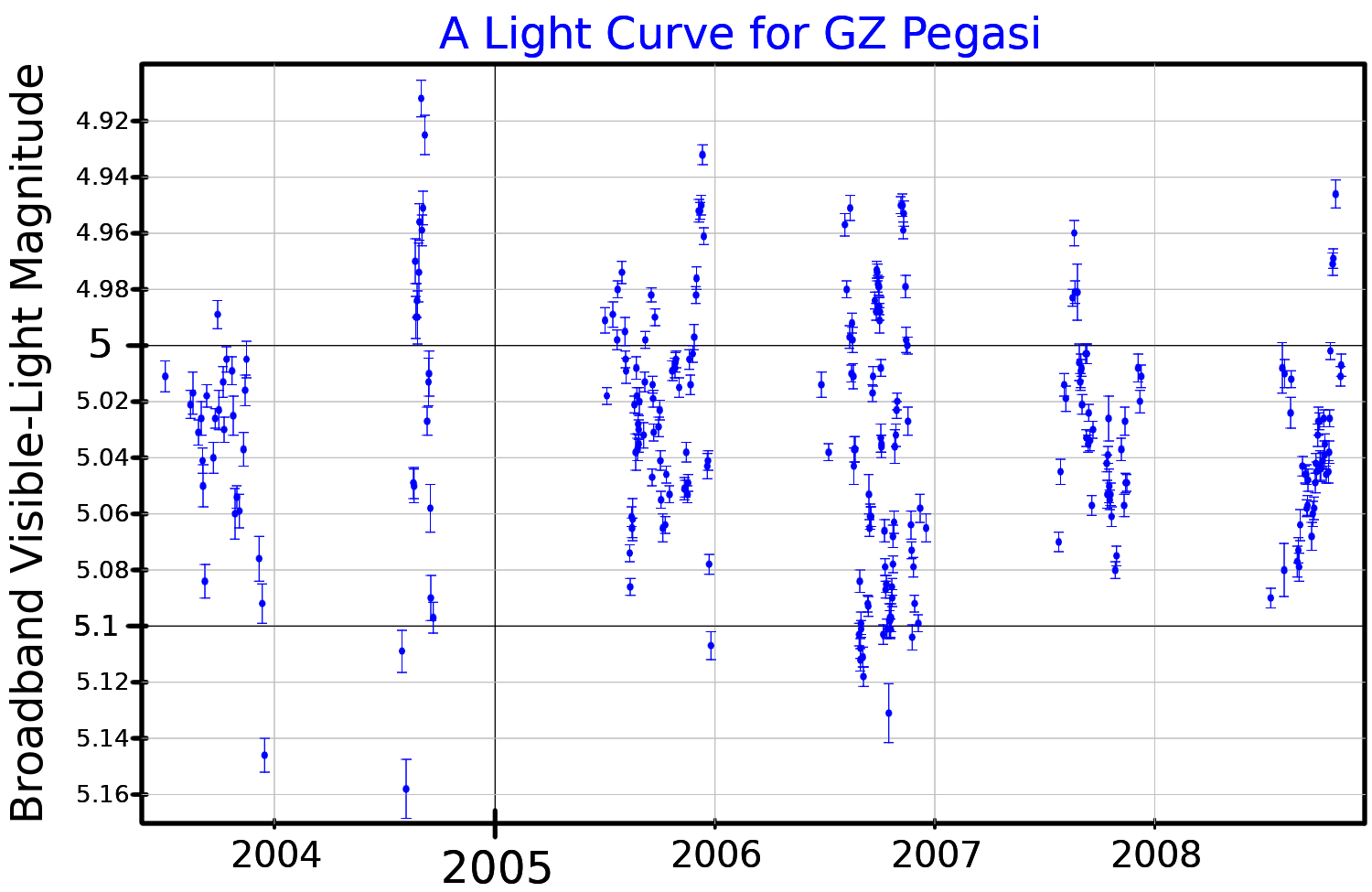
- A broadband optical light curve for GZ Pegasi, adapted from Tabur et al. (2009)

Observation data Epoch J2000.0 Equinox ICRS
- Constellation: Pegasus
- Right ascension: 23^{h} 09^{m} 31.45738^{s}
- Declination: +08° 40′ 37.7636″
- Apparent magnitude (V): 4.95 to 5.23

Characteristics
- Evolutionary stage: Asymptotic giant branch + main sequence
- Spectral type: M4IIIa + A3V
- U−B color index: 1.272
- B−V color index: 1.452
- Variable type: SRa

Astrometry
| Radial velocity (R_{v}) | +14.0±0.9 km/s |
| Proper motion (μ) | RA: +4.28 mas/yr Dec.: −6.29 mas/yr |
| Parallax (π) | 4.17±0.34 mas |
| Distance | 780 ± 60 ly (240 ± 20 pc) |
| Absolute magnitude (M_{V}) | −1.83 |

Details

Aa
| Mass | 3 M_{☉} 2 M_{☉} |
| Radius | 194+18 −22 R_{☉} |
| Luminosity | 4,220 L_{☉} |
| Surface gravity (log g) | 0.06 cgs |
| Temperature | 3,707+387 −227 K |
| Metallicity [Fe/H] | −0.99 dex |

Ab
| Mass | 1.9 M_{☉} |

Other designations
- 57 Peg, GZ Peg, BD+07°4981, HD 218634, HIP 114347, HR 8815, SAO 128001, WDS 23095+0841

Database references
| SIMBAD | data |

57 Pegasi is a variable binary star system in the northern constellation of Pegasus (constellation). It has the variable star designation GZ Pegasi, while 57 Pegasi is the Flamsteed designation. The system is faintly visible to the naked eye as a point of light with an apparent visual magnitude that fluctuates around five. It is located at a distance of approximately 780 light years from the Sun based on parallax, and is drifting further away with a radial velocity of +14 km/s.

The variability of this star was discovered by J. Stebbins and C. M. Huffer in 1930. It was classified as a long-period variable of type Lb in 1974. However, based on a constant period and the shape of the light curve, it was later reclassified as a semiregular variable of type SRa in 1978. It varies in brightness from magnitude 4.95 down to 5.23 with a period of 92.66 days. The spectrum of 57 Peg displays blended features that indicate this is a binary system consisting of an aging red giant star on the asymptotic giant branch with a stellar classification of M4IIIa, and a fainter but hotter A-type main-sequence companion of class A3V. This spectroscopic binary system has poorly constrained orbital elements with an estimated orbital period of 100–500 years.

The red giant primary has been designated as an S-type star that shows enriched levels of s-process elements in its spectrum. However, it does not display significant lines of radioactive technetium-99 in its spectrum, indicating that the s-process elements must have been acquired from a mass transfer event from a formerly asymptotic giant branch companion that had passed through multiple dredge-up events. This would suggest it has a white dwarf as a tertiary companion, but this is incompatible with the data findings. Instead, it might have been misclassified as an S-type star.

There is a magnitude 10.06 visual companion at an angular separation of 32.6″ along a position angle of 198° from the primary, as of 2015. Designated component B, this star was first reported by F. G. W. Struve in 1827.
