= UU Aurigae =

Star in the constellation of Auriga

- Location of UU Aurgae (circled)

Observation data Epoch J2000 Equinox ICRS
- Constellation: Auriga
- Right ascension: 06^{h} 36^{m} 32.83710^{s}
- Declination: +38° 26′ 43.8190″
- Apparent magnitude (V): 4.9–7.0

Characteristics
- Evolutionary stage: AGB
- Spectral type: C5,3-C7,4(N3)
- Apparent magnitude (G): 4.14±0.01
- B−V color index: 2.61
- R−I color index: 1.43
- Variable type: SRb

Astrometry
Radial velocity (R_{v})	13.40 km/s
Proper motion (μ)	RA: 0.500±0.176 mas/yr Dec.: −19.758±0.167 mas/yr
Parallax (π)	2.0387±0.1661 mas
Distance	341 pc
Absolute magnitude (M_{V})	−3.65

Details
Radius	370 R_{☉}
Luminosity	16,443 L_{☉}
Temperature	2,760 K

Other designations
- GC 8581, SAO 59280, BD+38° 1539, HD 46687, HIP 31579, HR 2405, Gaia DR3 944939847899350784

Database references
SIMBAD	data

UU Aurigae is a carbon star in the constellation Auriga. It is approximately 341 parsecs (1,110 light-years) from Earth. It is a variable star that is occasionally bright enough to be seen by the naked eye under excellent observing conditions.

== Description ==
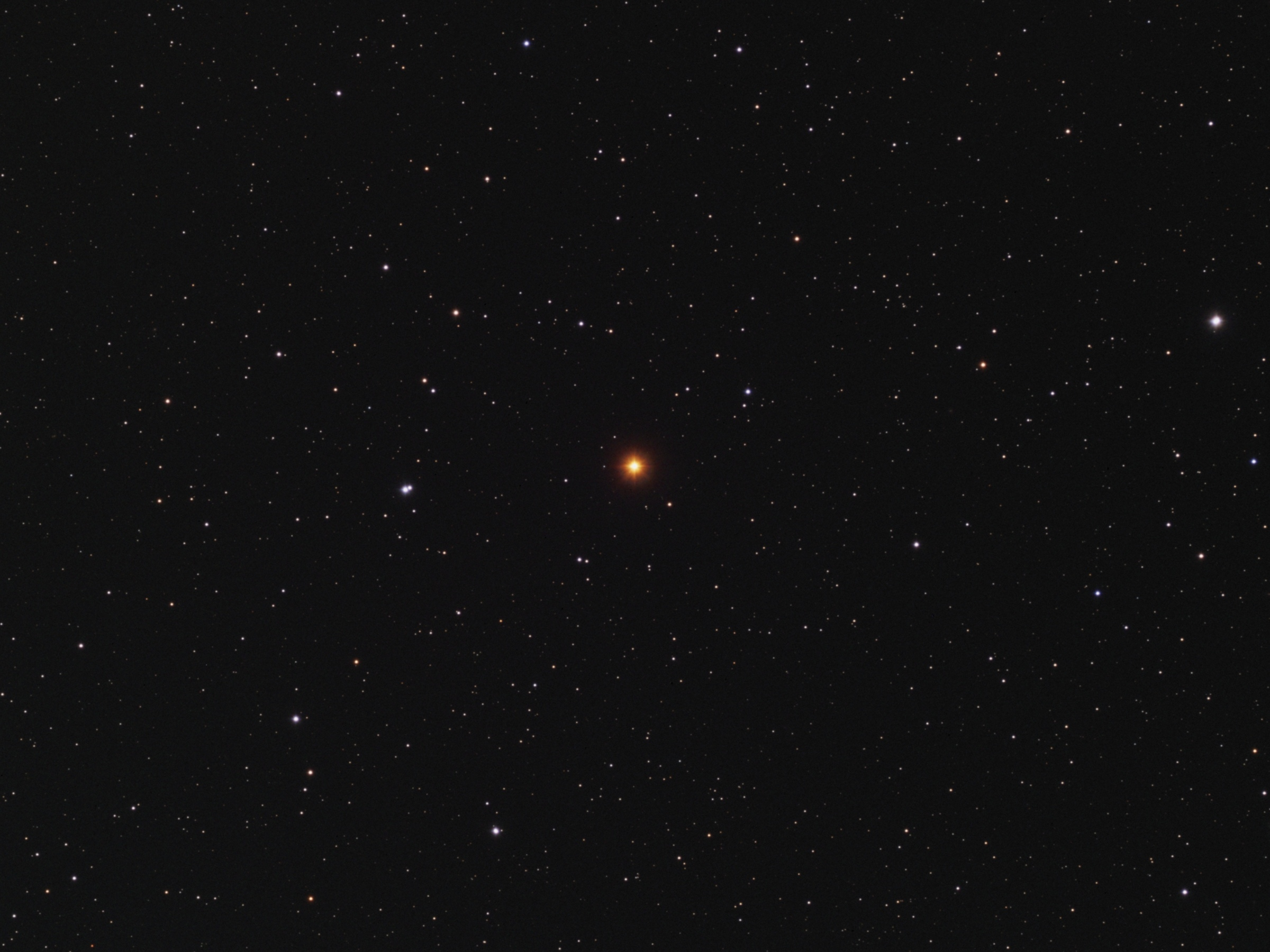
UU Aurigae in optical light

John Birmingham observed the star from 1871 to 1875, and detected its variability. It was confirmed as a variable star by Thomas William Backhouse in 1905, based on observations from 1894 to 1904. It was given its variable star designation in 1912.

UU Aurigae is a carbon-rich asymptotic giant branch star. The spectral type listed in the General Catalogue of Variable Stars (GCVS) is C5,3-C7,4(N3). The N3 refers back to an older type of classification where carbon stars were given spectral types of N or R, although the numeric index was correlated more with the strength of the carbon chemistry rather than temperature. The C5 to C7 indicates various classifications using the newer Morgan-Keenan system where the numeric index corresponds better to the temperature of the star. C5 to C7 types are approximately equivalent to early-M stars. The second numeric index, 3 or 4 for UU Aurigae indicates the strength of the Swan bands in the spectrum, on a scale of 1 to 5. Using the more modern revised Morgan-Keenan scheme, a spectral type of C-N5- C2 6- has been published, with the C-N5 indicating an N-type carbon star with a temperature index of 5-, and a Swan band strength of 6- on a scale of 1 to 8.

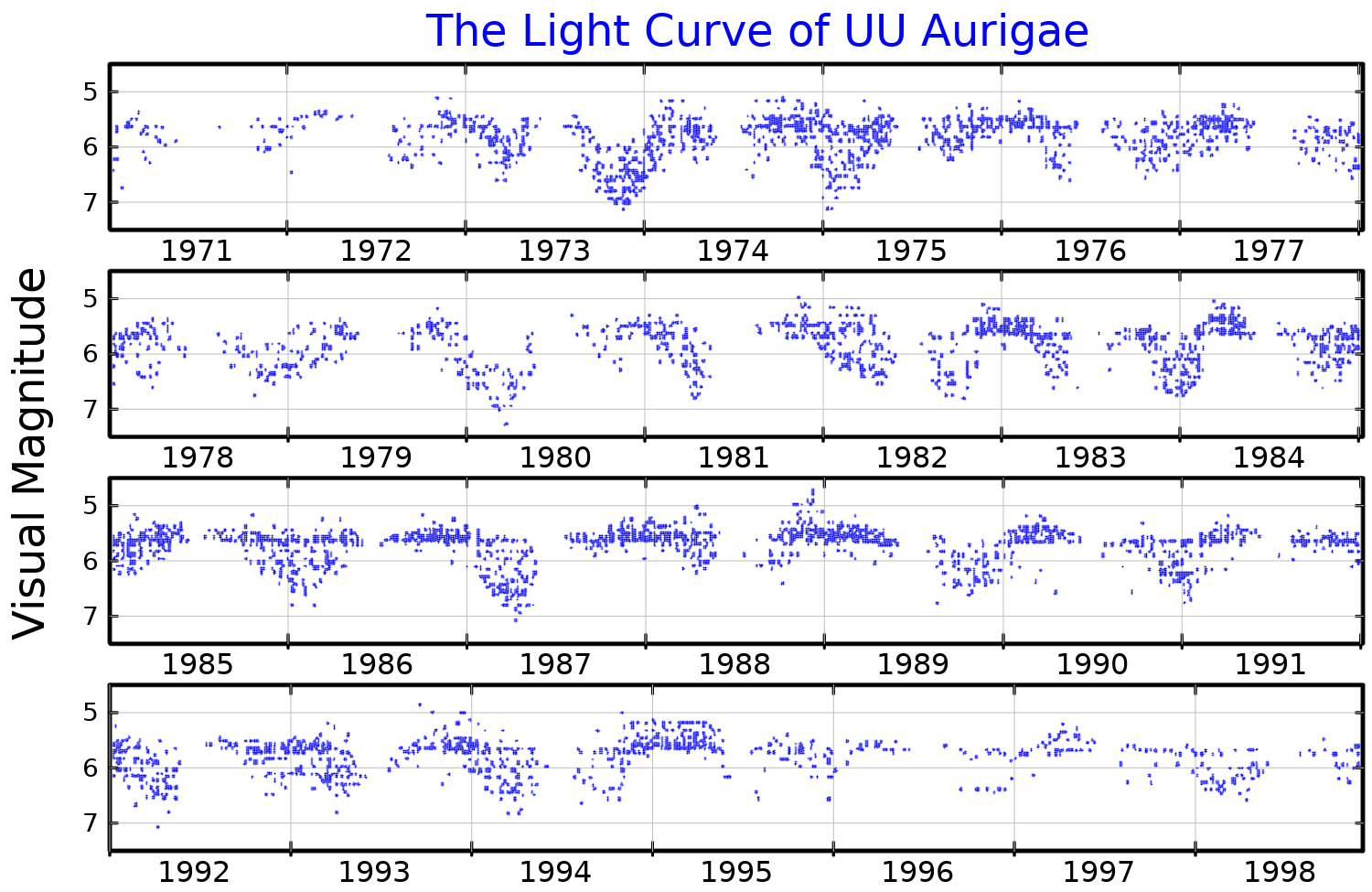
A 28 year long visual band light curve for UU Aurigae, adapted from Howarth (2001)

UU Aurigae is classified as a semiregular variable of type SRb, indicating it is a giant star with poorly defined variations. Its brightness varies from magnitude +4.9 to +7.0 in visual apparent magnitude. The period is given in the GCVS as 441 days, but there is also a strong variation with a period of 235 days. Using British Astronomical Association observations from 1971 to 1998, the periods are calculated as 439.4 and 233.1 days.

The angular diameter of UU Aurigae has been measured at 12.07 ± 0.22 mas using very-long-baseline interferometry (VLBI). Around the star is a shell of dust made up largely of amorphous carbon and silicon carbide (SiC), with the SiC appearing at three times the star's radius and the amorphous carbon at nine times its radius. Further out is a carbon-rich shell at 300 stellar radii and two oxygen-rich shells even further away. UU Aurigae also has a bow shock 0.14 parsec wide, created by its motion through the interstellar medium.
