= 15 Arietis =

Single, variable star in the constellation Aries

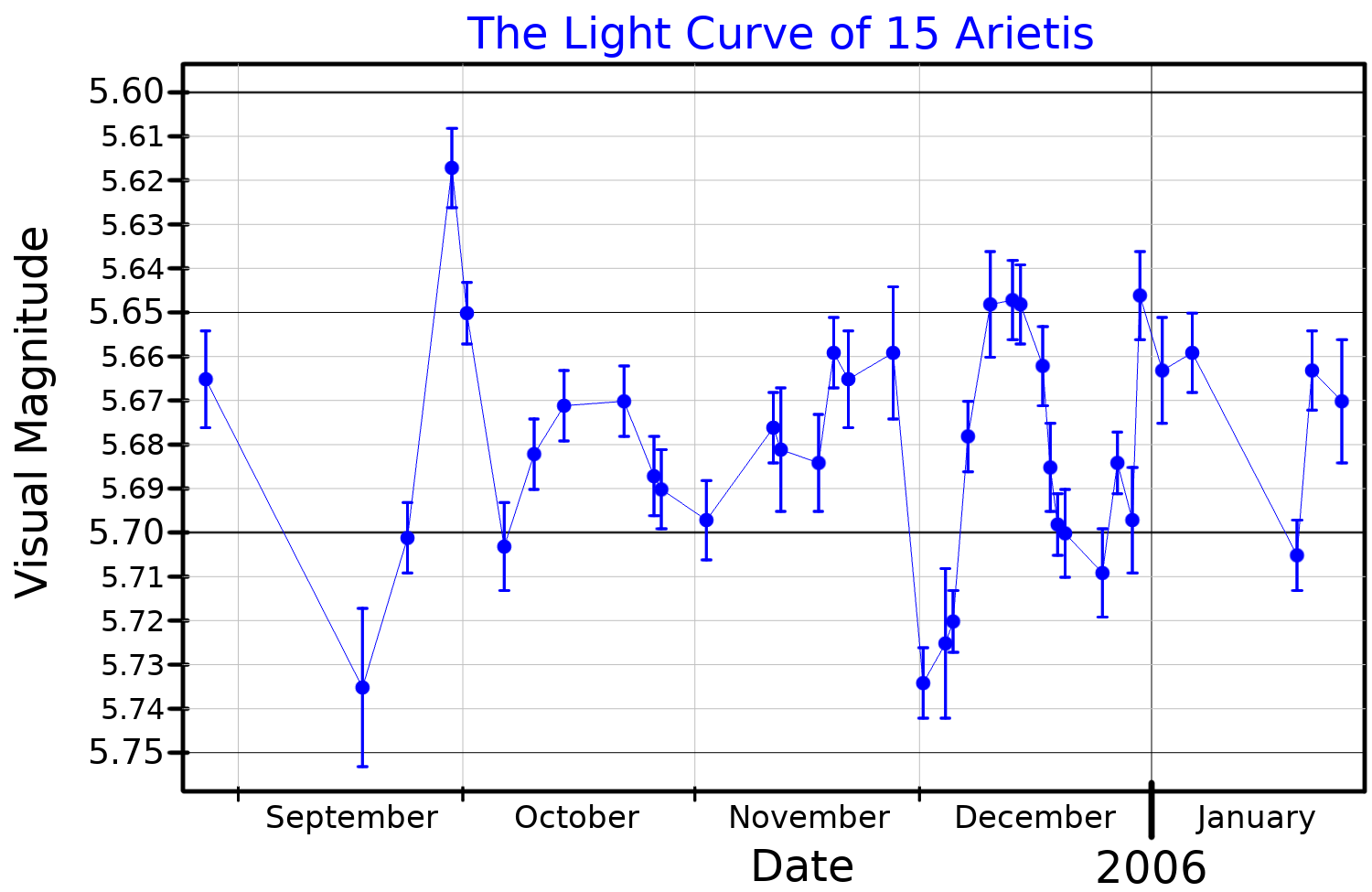
- A visual band light curve for 15 Arietis, plotted from data presented by Tabur et al. (2009)

Observation data Epoch J2000 Equinox ICRS
- Constellation: Aries
- Right ascension: 02^{h} 10^{m} 37.59642^{s}
- Declination: +19° 30′ 01.2099″
- Apparent magnitude (V): 5.67 - 5.74

Characteristics
- Evolutionary stage: AGB
- Spectral type: M3 III
- U−B color index: +1.91
- B−V color index: +1.64
- Variable type: SRs

Astrometry
Radial velocity (R_{v})	+62.04 ± 0.22 km/s
Proper motion (μ)	RA: +87.88 mas/yr Dec.: -27.82 mas/yr
Parallax (π)	5.84±0.49 mas
Distance	560 ± 50 ly (170 ± 10 pc)
Absolute magnitude (M_{V})	−0.9

Details
Mass	1.4 M_{☉}
Radius	87 R_{☉}
Luminosity	781 L_{☉}
Temperature	3,565 K

Other designations
- AV Arietis, BD+18°277, FK5 1056, HD 13325, HIP 10155, HR 631, SAO 92822

Database references
SIMBAD	data

15 Arietis (abbreviated 15 Ari) is a single variable star in the northern constellation of Aries. 15 Arietis is the Flamsteed designation; it also bears the variable star designation AV Arietis. It has an apparent visual magnitude of 5.74, which is just bright enough to be visible to the naked eye from dark suburban skies. An annual parallax shift of 5.84 mas corresponds to a physical distance of approximately 560 light-years (170 parsecs) from Earth. At that distance, the star's brightness is reduced by 0.33 in magnitude because of extinction from interstellar gas and dust.

This is a red giant star with a stellar classification of M3 III. The measured angular diameter of this star is 3.67 ± 0.11 mas. At its estimated distance, this yields a physical size of about 67 times the radius of the Sun. The radius determined from the observed brightness and colour of the star is 87 R_{☉}.

15 Arietis is a short period semiregular variable with the designation AV Arietis. The period given in the General Catalogue of Variable Stars is 5.032 days. Longterm photometry finds that the strongest pulsation period is 18.1 days with an amplitude of 0.028 magnitudes, while a second is 21.9 days and 0.030 in magnitude.
