= BI Cygni =

Star in the constellation Cygnus

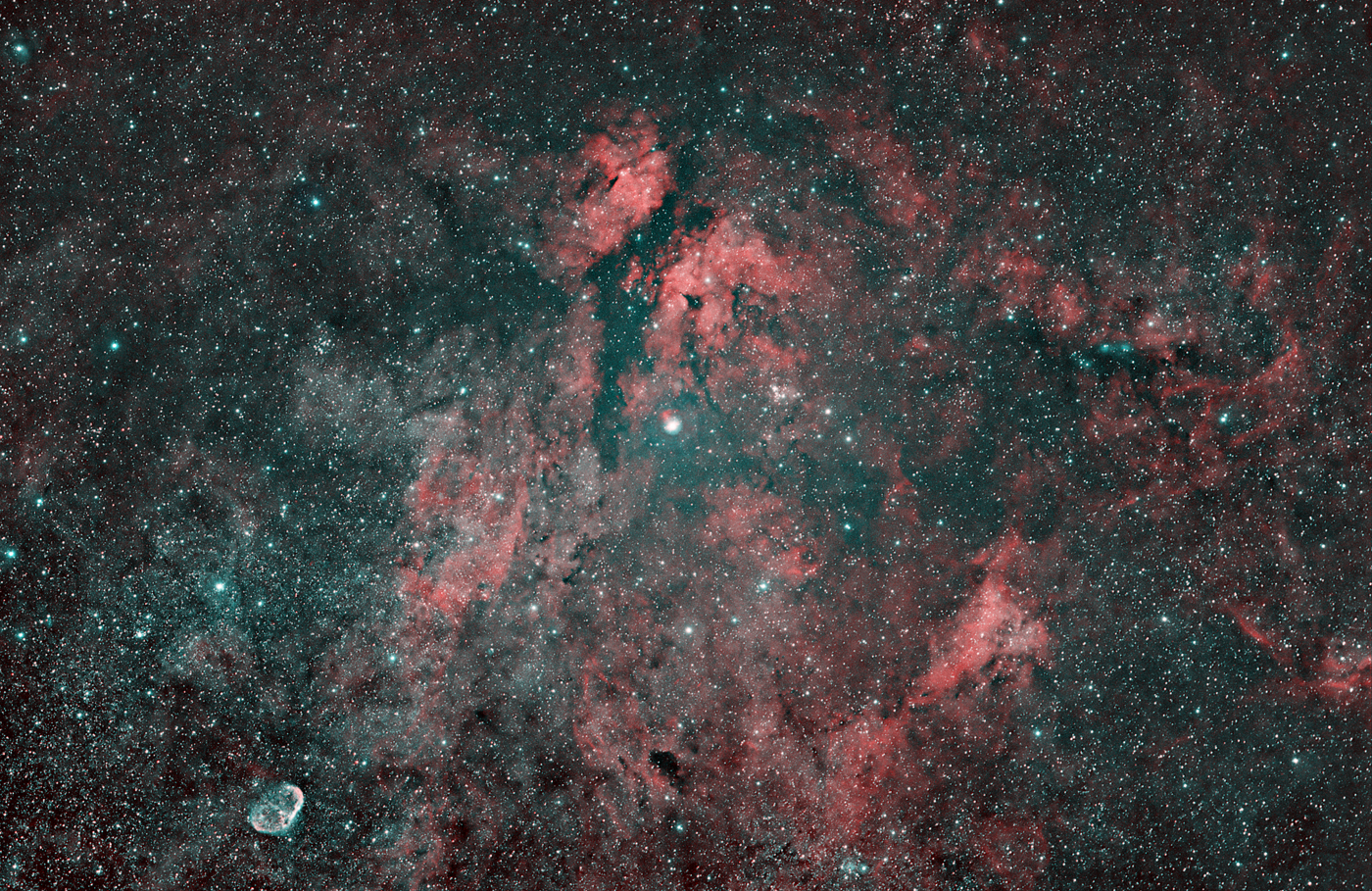
- BI Cygni is the small very red dot right on the left edge of this image. The bright star at the centre is γ Cygni and north is to the right. Credit: Erik Larsen

Observation data Epoch J2000 Equinox ICRS
- Constellation: Cygnus
- Right ascension: 20^{h} 21^{m} 21.8869^{s}
- Declination: +36° 55′ 55.729″
- Apparent magnitude (V): 8.4 – 9.9

Characteristics
- Evolutionary stage: Red supergiant
- Spectral type: M4 Iab
- Variable type: Lc

Astrometry
Radial velocity (R_{v})	−7.48±0.42 km/s
Proper motion (μ)	RA: −2.751 mas/yr Dec.: −5.459 mas/yr
Parallax (π)	0.3541±0.0377 mas
Distance	4,349+548 −440 ly (1,334+168 −135 pc)
Absolute magnitude (M_{V})	−6.78

Details
Mass	17 M_{☉}
Radius	852+12 −9 – 908+12 −10 R_{☉}
Luminosity	89,300 L_{☉}
Surface gravity (log g)	-0.35 cgs
Temperature	3,575 K
Metallicity [Fe/H]	+0.40 dex
Age	>12 Myr

Other designations
- RAFGL 2559, BI Cyg, BD+36°4025, WDS J20214+3656, TIC 13249363, TYC 2684-522-1, GSC 02684-00522, IRAS 20194+3646, IRC +40408, 2MASS J20212192+3655555

Database references
SIMBAD	data

BI Cygni (abbreviated to BI Cyg), also known as BD+36°4025, is a red supergiant or hypergiant in the constellation Cygnus. It is an irregular variable star with a maximum brightness of magnitude 8.4 and a minimum of magnitude 9.9. It is considered a member of the Cygnus OB1 stellar association, its distance is around 1,300 parsecs (4,200 ly) of the Solar System. It is less than a degree south of another variable red supergiant, BC Cygni.

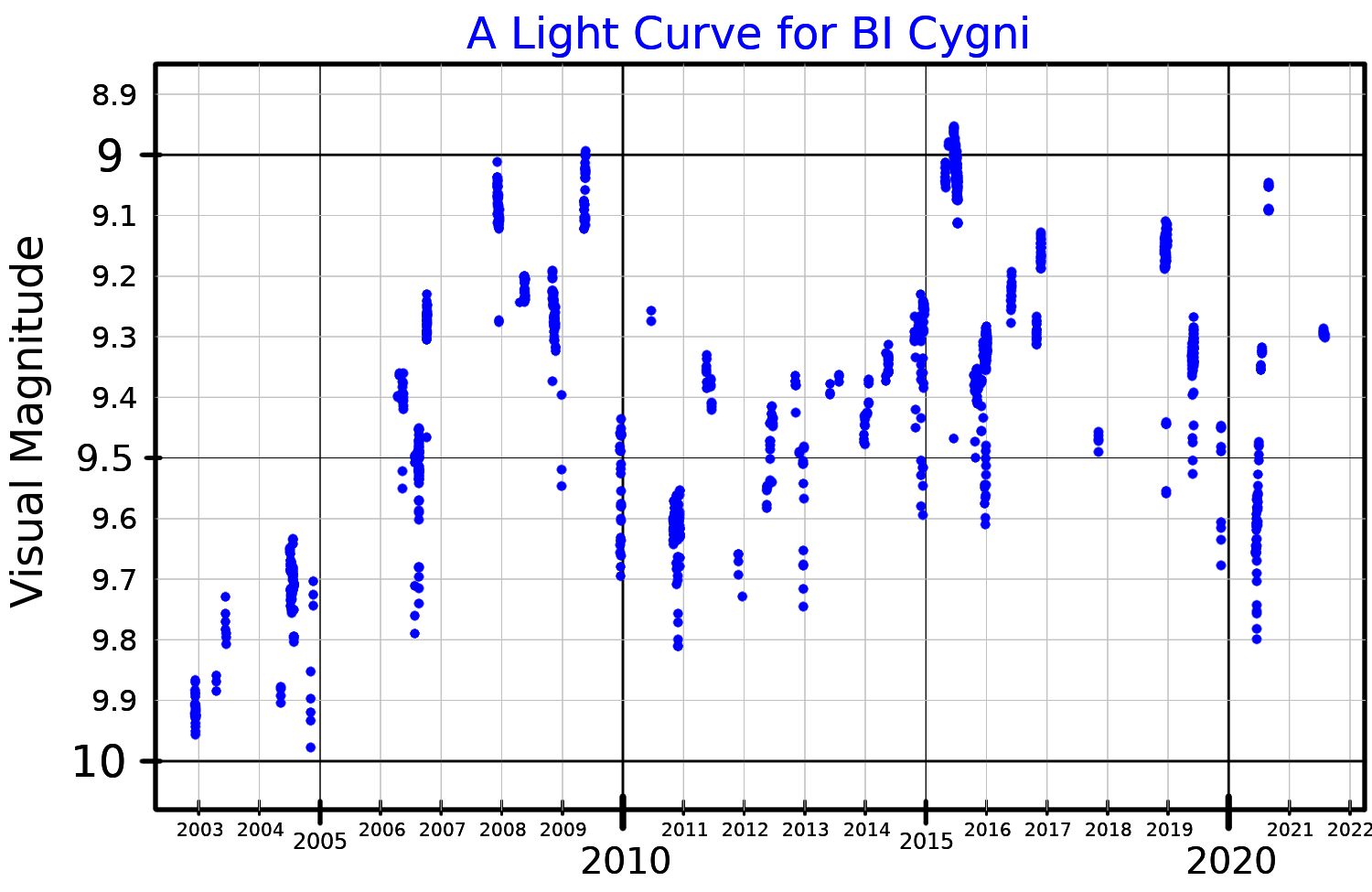
A visual band light curve for BI Cygni, plotted from INTEGRAL OMC data

BI Cyg is a slow irregular variable star classified as type Lc, an irregular supergiant. Its brightness changes between extremes of magnitude 8.4 and 9.9. Frequency analysis of its light curve shows no significant periods.

BI Cyg is one of the largest known stars with a radius around 850 R_{☉}, measured by its angular diameter by the CHARA array. It is about 90,000 times more luminous that the Sun and has a cool effective temperature of 3,535 K. Its mass is estimated at 17 solar masses, and it took 12 million years to enter the red supergiant phase.

== See also ==
- AZ Cygni
- KY Cygni
- NML Cygni
- RW Cygni
