= HD 3346 =

Binary star system in the constellation Andromeda

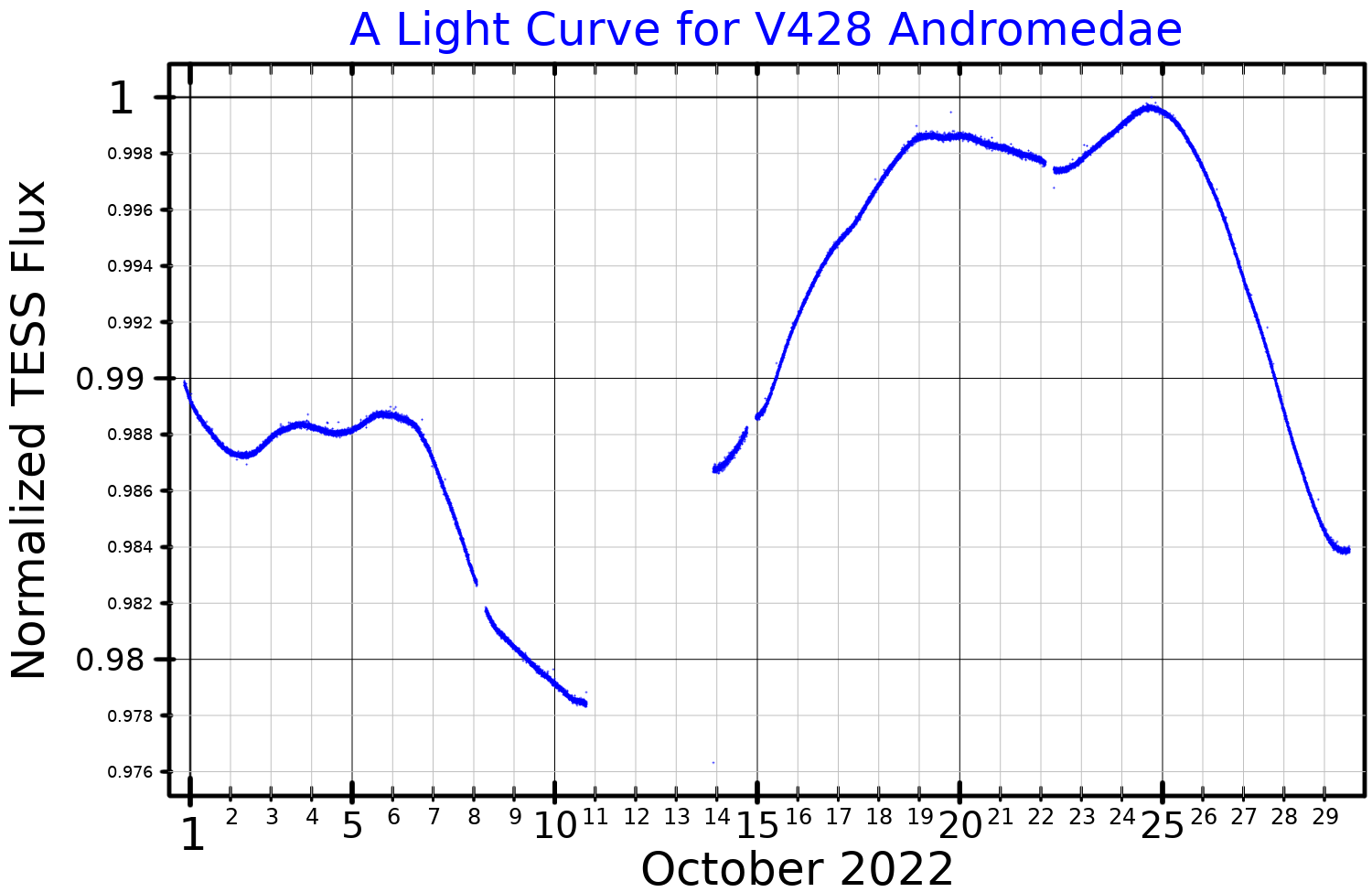
- A light curve for V428 Andromedae, plotted from TESS data,

Observation data Epoch J2000 Equinox ICRS
- Constellation: Andromeda
- Right ascension: 00^{h} 36^{m} 46.44107^{s}
- Declination: +44° 29′ 18.9202″
- Apparent magnitude (V): 5.13 – 5.19

Characteristics
- Evolutionary stage: AGB
- Spectral type: K6 IIIa (K5 - M0 III)
- B−V color index: 1.587±0.005
- Variable type: SRS

Astrometry
Radial velocity (R_{v})	−33.46±0.22 km/s
Proper motion (μ)	RA: −37.121 mas/yr Dec.: +32.293 mas/yr
Parallax (π)	4.7240±0.0894 mas
Distance	690 ± 10 ly (212 ± 4 pc)
Absolute magnitude (M_{V})	−1.23

Orbit
Period (P)	576.2±3.5 d
Eccentricity (e)	0.30±0.06
Periastron epoch (T)	43787±22 MJD
Argument of periastron (ω) (secondary)	279±15°
Semi-amplitude (K_{1}) (primary)	0.69±0.08 km/s

Details
Mass	1.2 M_{☉}
Radius	69.98±2.98 R_{☉}
Luminosity	979.2±76.65 L_{☉}
Surface gravity (log g)	1.19±0.16 cgs
Temperature	3909±170 K
Metallicity [Fe/H]	−0.00±0.10 dex
Rotational velocity (v sin i)	2.9 km/s
Age	8.5 Gyr

Other designations
- V428 Andromedae, BD+43°113, HD 3346, HIP 2900, HR 152, SAO 36509, PPM 43119

Database references
SIMBAD	data

HD 3346, also known as V428 Andromedae, is a binary star system in the northern constellation of Andromeda. It is a dim star but visible to the naked eye under suitable viewing conditions, having an apparent visual magnitude of 5.14. The distance to HD 3346 can be determined from its annual parallax shift of 4.72 mas. This yields a range of about 690 light-years (210 parsecs). At that distance the brightness of the system is diminished by an extinction of 0.16 magnitude due to interstellar dust. It is moving closer to the Earth with a heliocentric radial velocity of −33 km/s.

== Binary system ==
This is a single-lined spectroscopic binary system with an orbital period of 576 days and an eccentricity of 0.3. The a sin i value for the primary is 5.1 ± 0.6 Gm (0.0341 ± 0.0040 AU), where a is the semimajor axis and i is the (unknown) orbital inclination. The provides a minimum value for the actual semimajor axis.

The visible component is a red giant star and has been defined as a standard star for the stellar classification of K6 IIIa. Prior to that there had been no spectral standard for K6 giants and HD 3346 had been classified between K5 III and M0 III.

In 1996 it was announced that the variations in radial velocity of this star were larger than expected. Two orbiting companions were proposed to explain this variation, the one known since 1985 with a period of about 650 days and a minimum mass of about 60 M_{J}, and a second one with a period of about 14-40 days and a minimum mass of about 10 M_{J}. The existence of this second, possibly planetary companion was never confirmed.

== Variability ==
In 1982, HD 3346 was listed as a suspected variable star (NSV 15135) in Pavel Nikolaevich Kholopov's catalog of suspected variable stars. Gregory W. Henry et al. confirmed that the star is variable in year 2000. It was given its variable star designation, V428 Andromedae, in 2003.

It is a short-period semi-regular variable (type SRS), also called an ultra-small-amplitude pulsating red giant. It has an amplitude of only 0.065 magnitudes. The main pulsation period is 11.5 days, but other periods of 11, 15, and 22 days have been detected.
