= T Centauri =

Variable star in the constellation Centaurus

- Location of T Centauri (circled in red)

Observation data Epoch J2000.0 Equinox J2000.0
- Constellation: Centaurus
- Right ascension: 13^{h} 41^{m} 45.56353^{s}
- Declination: −33° 35′ 50.5600″
- Apparent magnitude (V): 5.56 – 8.44

Characteristics
- Evolutionary stage: AGB or post-AGB
- Spectral type: K0:e-M4II:e
- Variable type: semiregular

Astrometry
Radial velocity (R_{v})	+32.6±2.5 km/s
Proper motion (μ)	RA: −27.747 mas/yr Dec.: +3.365 mas/yr
Parallax (π)	2.4007±0.0687 mas
Distance	1,360 ± 40 ly (420 ± 10 pc)

Other designations
- T Cen, CD−32°9549, HD 119090, HIP 66825, HR 5147, SAO 204739

Database references
SIMBAD	data

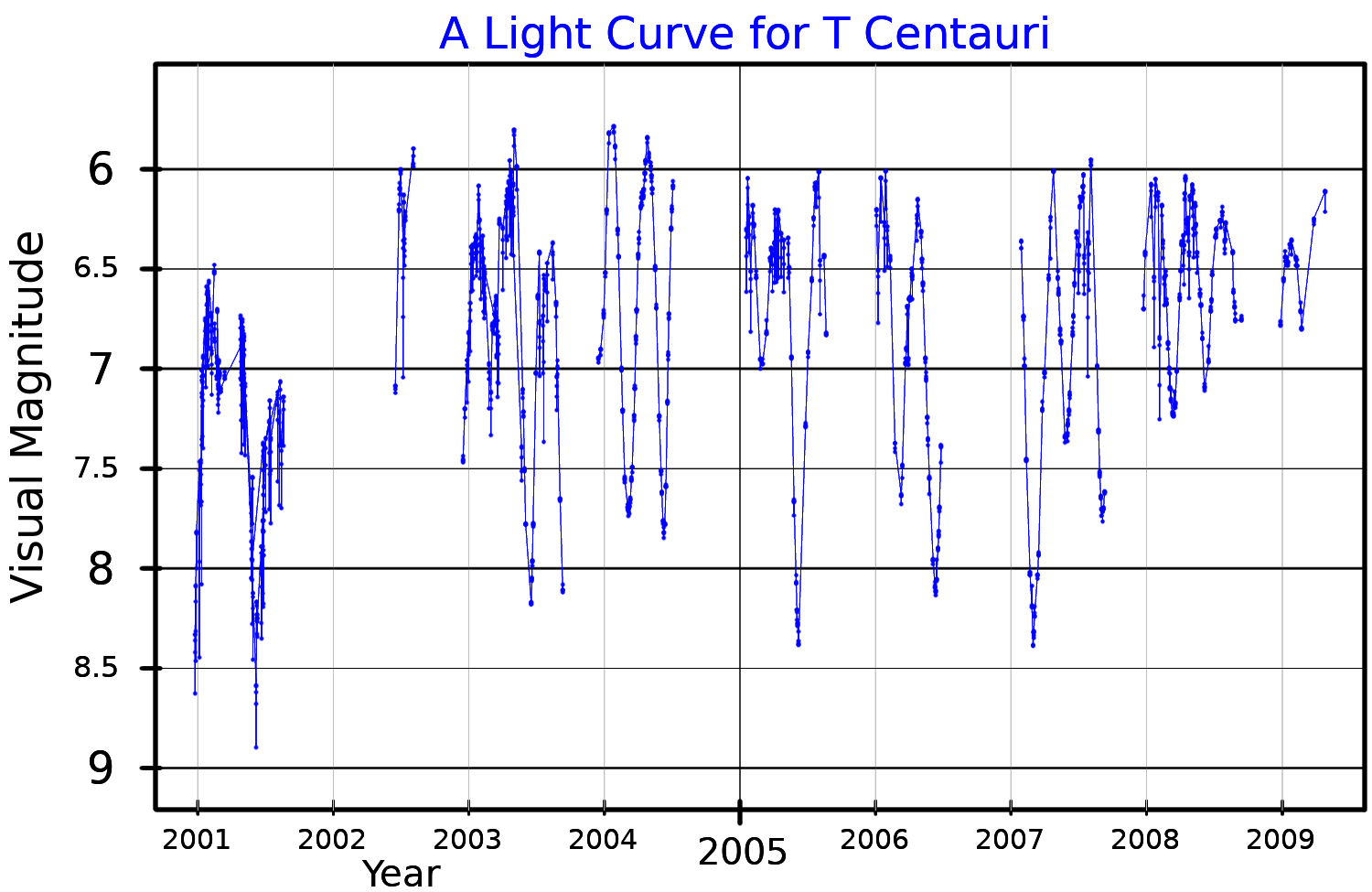
A visual band light curve for T Centauri, plotted from ASAS data

T Centauri is a variable star located in the far southern constellation Centaurus. It varies between magnitudes 5.56 and 8.44 over 181.4 days, making it intermittently visible to the naked eye. Pulsating between spectral classes K0:e and M4II:e, it has been classed as a semiregular variable, though Sebastian Otero of the American Association of Variable Star Observers has noted its curve more aligned with RV Tauri variable stars and has classified it as one.

The variability of the star was discovered in 1894 by Ernest Elliott Markwick, and independently by Williamina Fleming in 1895.
