= J band (infrared) =

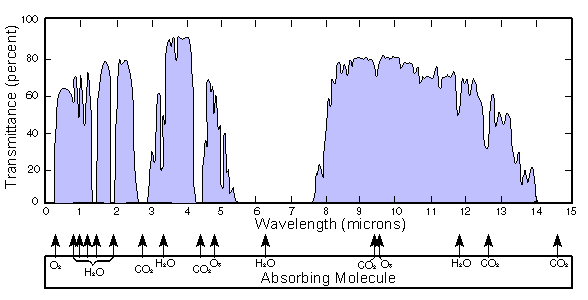
Atmospheric windows in the infrared. The J band is the transmission window (1.1 to 1.4 μm) centred on 1.25 micrometres. (The gap between the J band and lower bands is too small to be visible at this scale; as a result they blend together and appear to comprise a single, contigous band.)

In infrared astronomy, the J band refers to an atmospheric transmission window (1.1 to 1.4 μm) centred on 1.25 micrometres (in the near-infrared).

Betelgeuse is the brightest near-IR source in the sky with a J band magnitude of −2.99. The next brightest stars in the J band are Antares (−2.7), R Doradus (−2.6), Arcturus (−2.2), and Aldebaran (−2.1). In the J band Sirius is the 9th brightest star.

The J band is a frequent source of ground based observations since the wavelengths it covers pass through clouds and other atmospheric gasses. The waveband does however suffer from contamination by water vapor lines and hydroxide emission lines leading to relatively high photometric error.

It can be used to scrutinize the photosphere of giant and supergiant stars while mostly avoiding opacities from molecular bands and also has access to the 1080 nm He I line which is useful in the study of circumstellar disk interactions around T-Tauri stars. J, H and K-band spectroscopy is also commonly used to observe and research brown dwarfs and directly imaged exoplanets.
