= PIONIER (Very Large Telescope) =

Telescope at Paranal Observatory

Precision Integrated-Optics Near-infrared Imaging ExpeRiment
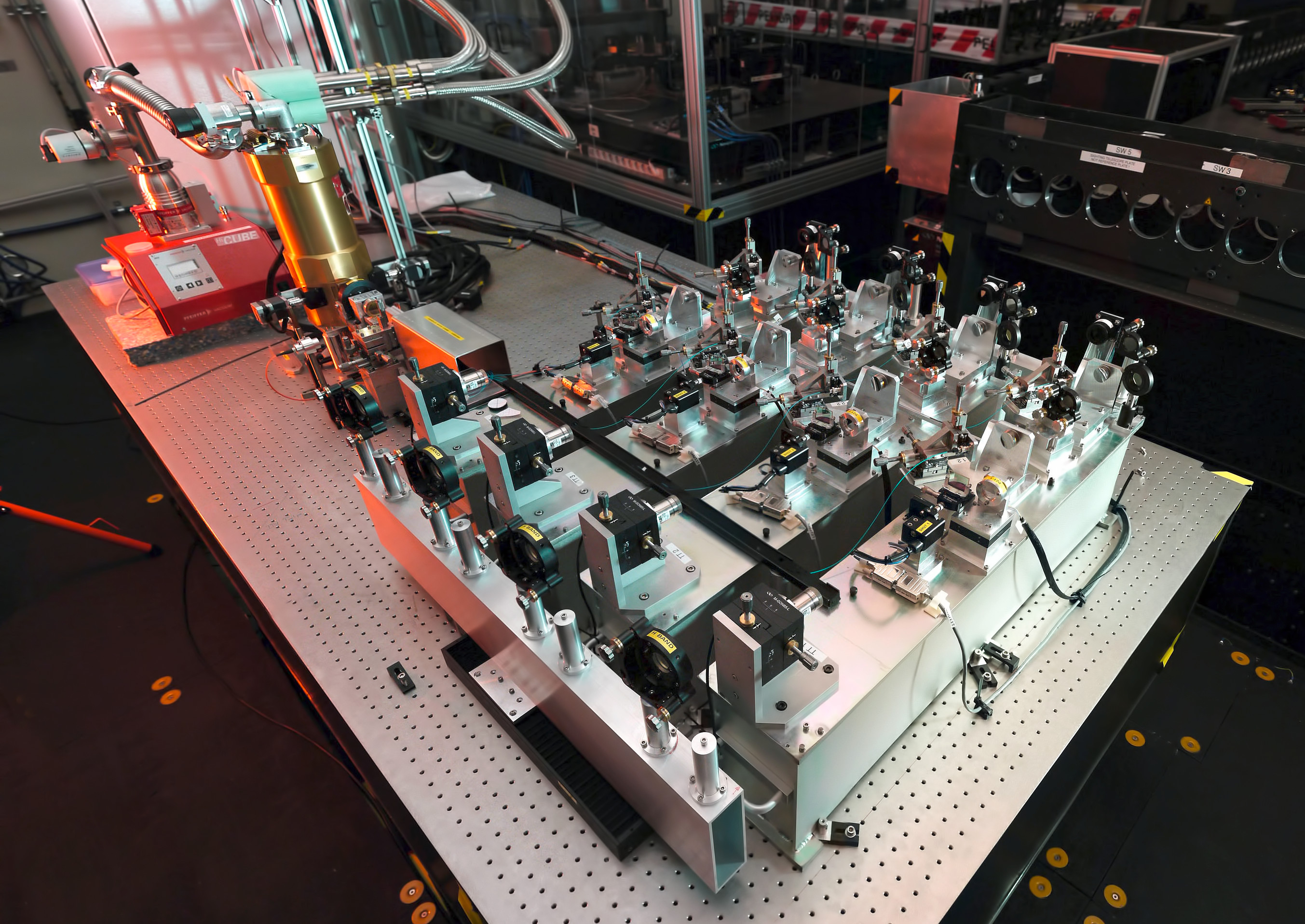
- Alternative names: PIONIER
- Related media on Commons

The Precision Integrated-optics Near-infrared Imaging Experiment (PIONIER) is a visiting instrument at the ESO's Paranal Observatory, part of the VLTI astronomical observatory. It combines the light from four telescopes simultaneously and provide 0.002 arc seconds of angular resolution, the equivalent angular resolution of a 100 m telescope.

PIONIER has been built at LAOG and has been installed at VLTI in November 2010.

== See also ==
- Lists of telescopes
