= Bandwidth smearing =

Bandwidth smearing is a type of chromatic aberration (color-related distortion) in the image of a celestial body (like a star or galaxy) observed using an astronomical interferometer (a system combining multiple telescopes to act as one). It is caused by the range of radio frequencies (or bandwidth) used in the observation, where, in Fourier terms, different frequencies capture slightly different spatial details of the object’s shape. This leads to a blurred or stretched appearance in the final image, often with elongated features pointing outward. In radio astronomy, this effect can be reduced by using higher spectral resolution (narrower frequency ranges) or adjusting the image reconstruction process to account for these differences.
