= 6 Geminorum =

Red supergiant star in the constellation Gemini

- Location of 6 Geminorum (circled)

Observation data Epoch J2000 Equinox ICRS
- Constellation: Gemini
- Right ascension: 06^{h} 12^{m} 19.09884^{s}
- Declination: +22° 54′ 30.6531″
- Apparent magnitude (V): 5.74 – 8.10

Characteristics
- Spectral type: M1-2 Ia-Iab
- U−B color index: +1.93
- B−V color index: +1.63
- Variable type: LC

Astrometry
Radial velocity (R_{v})	+27.16±0.42 km/s
Proper motion (μ)	RA: +0.144 mas/yr Dec.: −2.085 mas/yr
Parallax (π)	0.5642±0.0957 mas
Distance	approx. 5,800 ly (approx. 1,800 pc)
Absolute magnitude (M_{V})	−6.32

Details
Mass	~20 M_{☉}
Radius	821+60 −27 R_{☉}
Luminosity	86,000 L_{☉}
Surface gravity (log g)	0.0 cgs
Temperature	3,789 K

Other designations
- 6 Gem, BU Gem, BD+22°1220, GC 7896, HD 42543, HIP 29450, HR 2197, SAO 78098, TYC 1877-1719-1, 2MASS J06121911+2254305

Database references
SIMBAD	data

6 Geminorum is a variable star in the zodiac constellation of Gemini, located roughly 5,800 light years away from the Sun. It has the variable star designation BU Geminorum; 6 Geminorum is the Flamsteed designation. At its brightest this reddish hued star is barely visible to the naked eye but is readily visible with binoculars, found southeast of M 35, just to the south of WY Geminorum. It is moving further from the Earth with a heliocentric radial velocity of +27 km/s. The star is a member of the Gemini OB1 association.

This is an evolved red supergiant with a stellar classification of M1-2 Ia-Iab. It is a semiregular variable star, ranging from visual magnitude +5.7 down to +7.5 over a period of 325 days. It has been given the sub-classification of Lc, which means "Irregular variable supergiants of late spectral types having amplitudes of about 1 mag. in V.O". The star has expanded to 821 times the Sun's radius and is radiating 86,000 times the luminosity of the Sun from its swollen photosphere at an effective temperature of 3,789 K.

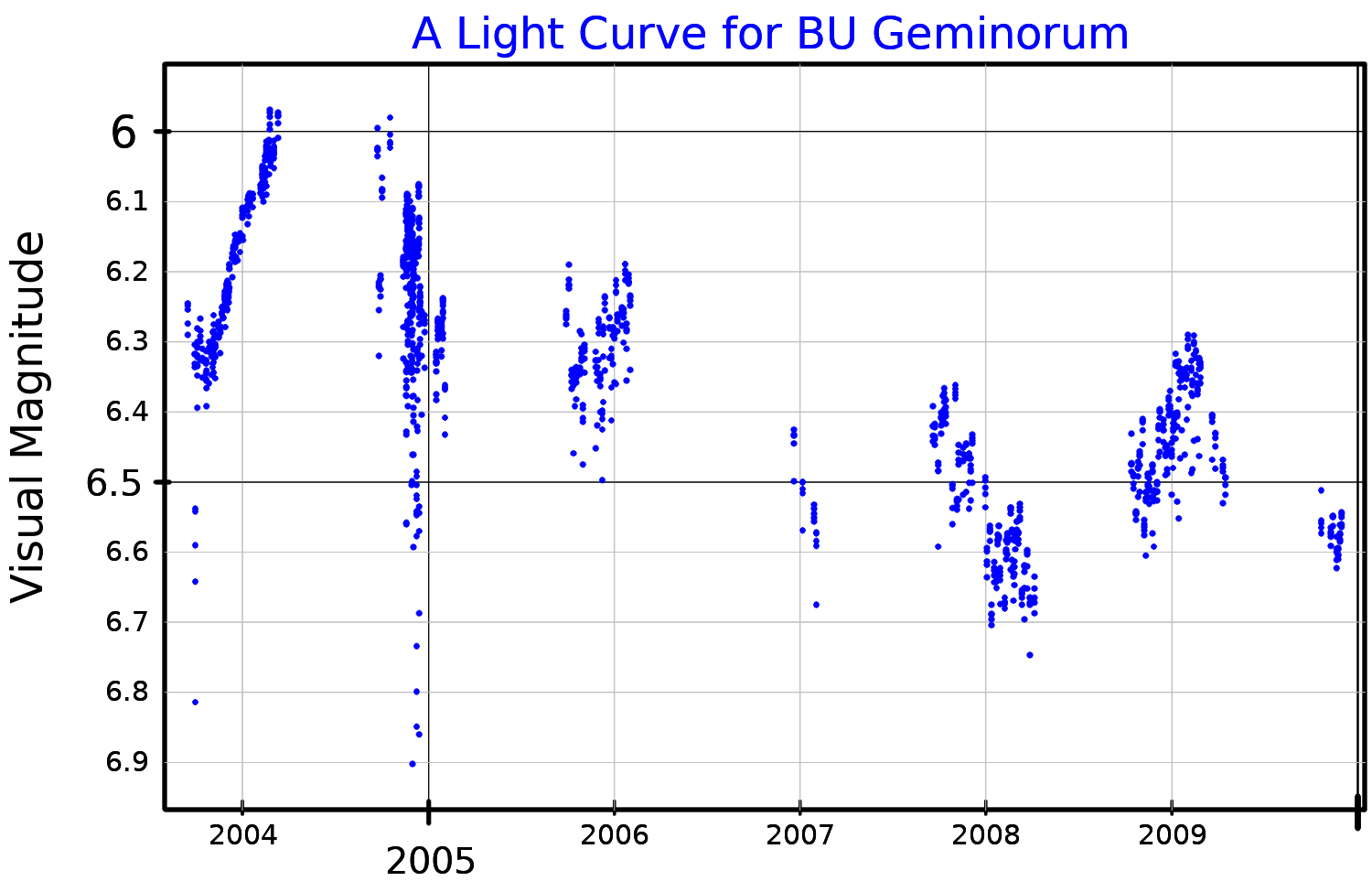
A light curve for BU Geminorum, plotted from TESS data

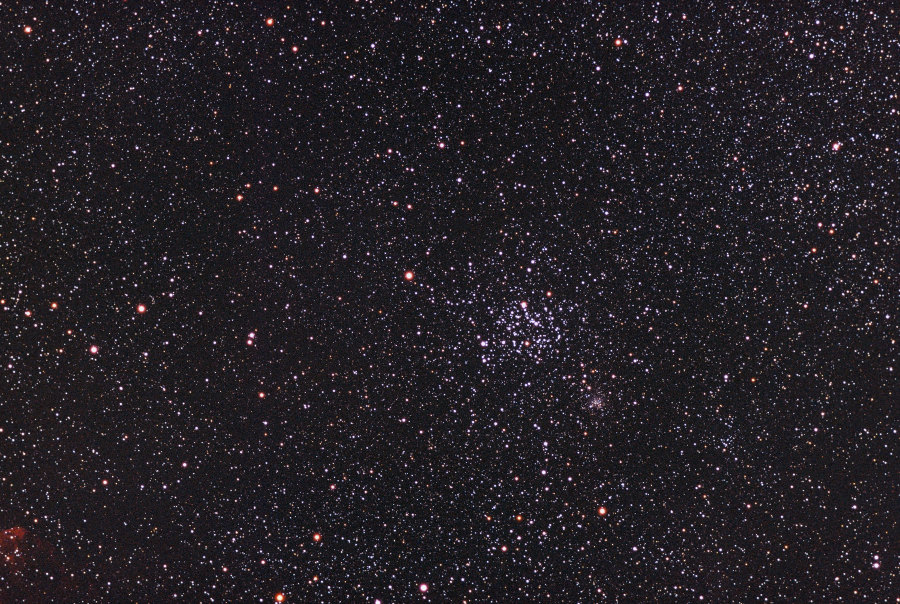
Messier 35, with 6 Gem visible right at the bottom edge of the image
