= RW Cygni =

Star in the constellation Cygnus

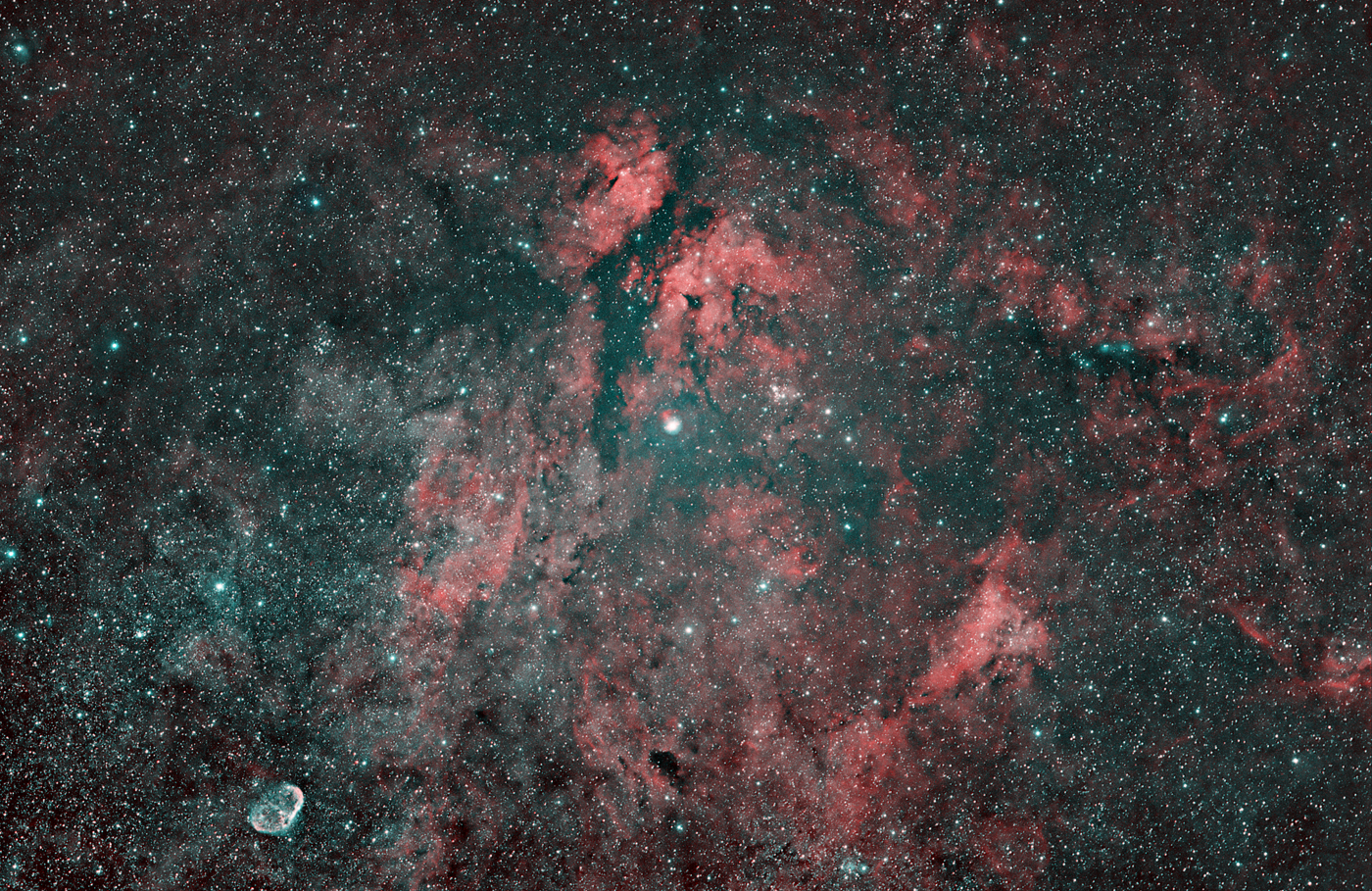
- Region around γ Cygni, with RW Cygni annotated on the full-size image (north is right)

Observation data Epoch J2000 Equinox ICRS
- Constellation: Cygnus
- Right ascension: 20^{h} 28^{m} 50.59027^{s}
- Declination: +39° 58′ 54.4180″
- Apparent magnitude (V): 8.05 - 9.70

Characteristics
- Evolutionary stage: Red supergiant or hypergiant
- Spectral type: M3-4Ia-Iab
- Variable type: SRc

Astrometry
Radial velocity (R_{v})	−18.39±0.52 km/s
Proper motion (μ)	RA: –3.255 mas/yr Dec.: –5.511 mas/yr
Parallax (π)	0.4602±0.0897 mas
Distance	1,620±40 pc
Absolute magnitude (M_{V})	–6.41

Details
Radius	1,103+251 −177 R_{☉}
Luminosity	126,000 L_{☉}
Temperature	3,600 K

Other designations
- RW Cyg, BD+39 4208, HIP 101023, IRAS 20270+3948, 2MASS J20285059+3958543

Database references
SIMBAD	data

RW Cygni is a semiregular variable star in the constellation Cygnus, about a degree east of 2nd magnitude γ Cygni. Its apparent magnitude varies between 8.05 and 9.70 and its spectral type between M3 and M4.

== Distance ==
The Gaia Data Release 2 parallax for RW Cyg is 0.4602±0.0897 mas or a distance of around 2.2 kpc. RW Cygni is assumed to be a member of the Cygnus OB9 stellar association and therefore around 3,600 light-years from the Solar System. Newer observations based on the parallaxes of neighbouring OB stars give RW Cygni a distance of 1.62 kpc.

== Properties ==
RW Cygni is a luminous red supergiant with a bolometric luminosity more than 100,000 L_{☉}. Its spectral type is given in the General Catalogue of Variable Stars as M2-4Ia-Iab, covering the range of previously published values. It has been defined as a standard star for the MK spectral classification of M3-M4Ia-Iab. In 2005, the effective temperature is directly calculated to be 3,600 K, giving a radius of 980 R_{☉}. An alternate calculation gives a higher temperature of 3,920 K and a correspondingly lower radius of 680 R_{☉}. A newer measurement based on its angular diameter (5.09 mas) and its Gaia Data Release 2 parallax give it a larger radius of 1,100 R_{☉}, which would make RW Cygni one of the largest known stars. Using the more conservative figure, if it was placed at the center of Solar System, it would be extend past the orbit of Mars and into the asteroid belt.

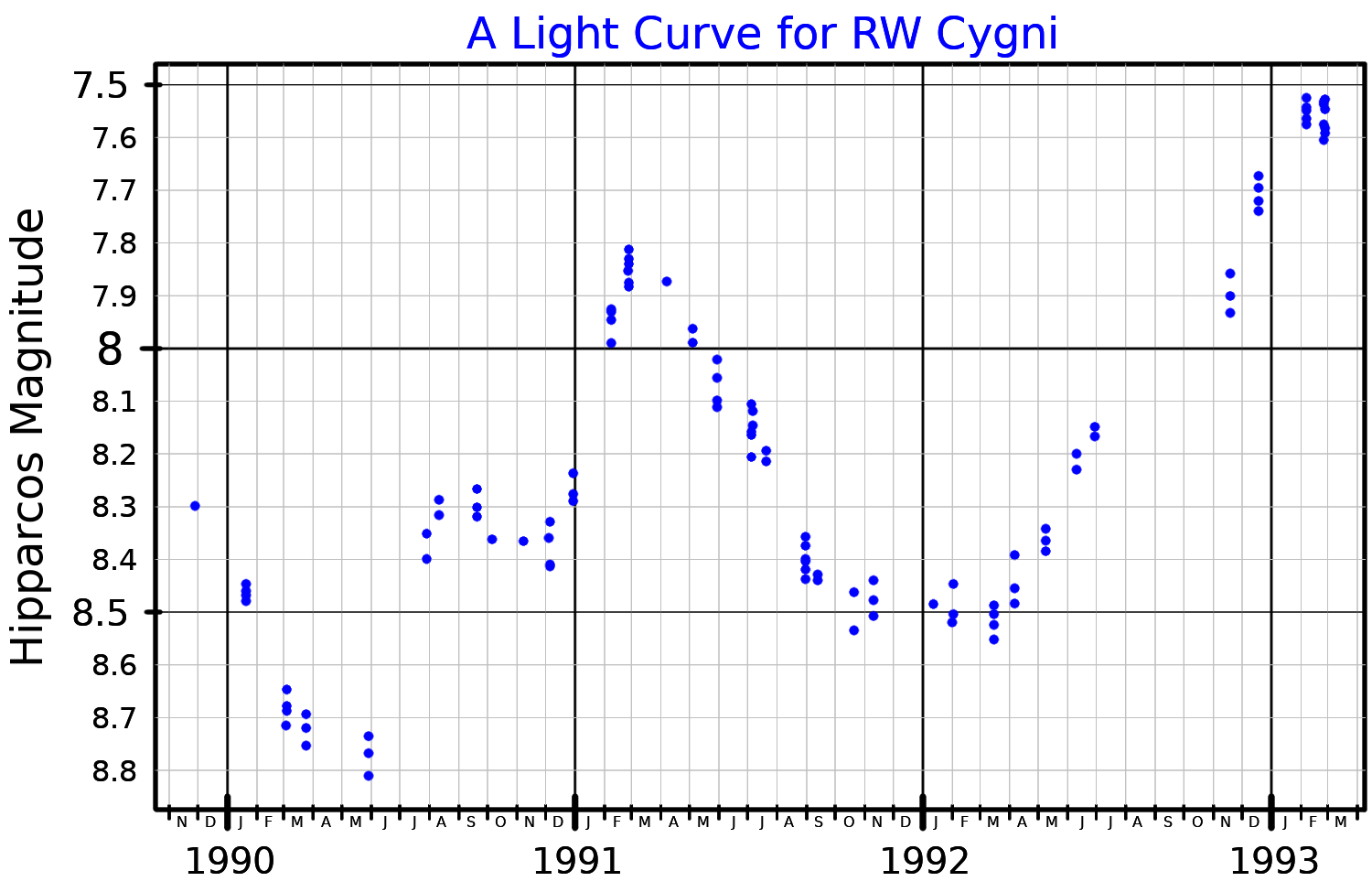
A light curve for RW Cygni, plotted from Hipparcos data

The initial mass of RW Cygni has been estimated from its position relative to theoretical stellar evolutionary tracks to be around 20 M_{☉}. Observations of its atmosphere suggest that it is losing mass at a rate of 3.2×10^{−6} M_{☉} per year.

In 1885, T. H. E. C. Espin discovered that the star is a variable star. It was listed with its variable star designation, RW Cygni, in Annie Jump Cannon's 1907 work Second Catalog of Variable Stars. RW Cygni is classified as a semiregular variable star. It is given the subtype SRc, indicating that it is a cool supergiant. Its brightness varies from extremes of magnitude +8.0 and +9.5 with a period of 580±80 d. No long secondary period has been detected.

== See also ==
- BC Cygni
- BI Cygni
- NML Cygni
- KY Cygni
