= Semiregular variable star =

Type of variable star

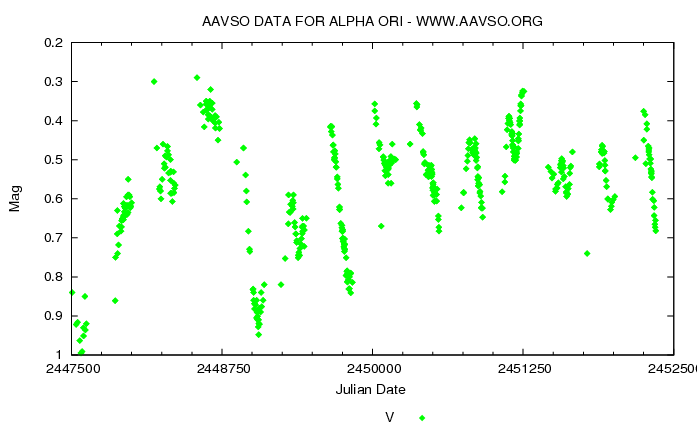
Light curve of semiregular variable star Betelgeuse

In astronomy, a semiregular variable star, a type of variable star, is a giant or supergiant of intermediate and late (cooler) spectral type. It shows considerable periodicity in its light changes, accompanied or sometimes interrupted by various irregularities. Periods lie in the range from 20 to more than 2000 days, while the shapes of the light curves may be rather different and variable with each cycle. The amplitudes may be from several hundredths to several magnitudes (usually 1-2 magnitudes in the V filter).

== Classification ==
The semiregular variable stars have been sub-divided into four categories for many decades, with a fifth related group defined more recently. The original definitions of the four main groups were formalised in 1958 at the tenth general assembly of the International Astronomical Union (IAU). The General Catalogue of Variable Stars (GCVS) has updated the definitions with some additional information and provided newer reference stars where old examples such as S Vul have been re-classified.

Semiregular variable subtypes
Subtype	IAU definition	GCVS code	GCVS definition	Standard stars
SRa	semi-regular variable giants of late spectral classes (M, C and S), which retain periodicity with comparative stability and possess, as a rule, small (less than 2^{m}.5) light-variation amplitudes. Amplitudes and forms of light curves are usually liable to strong variations from period to period. Many of these stars differ from Mira Ceti type stars only owing to the smaller amplitude of light variation.	SRA	Semiregular late-type (M, C, S or Me, Ce, Se) giants displaying persistent periodicity and usually small (<2.5 mag in V) light amplitudes. Amplitudes and light-curve shapes generally vary and periods are in the range of 35–1200 days. Many of these stars differ from Miras only by showing smaller light amplitudes	Z Aqr
SRb	semi-regular variable giants of late spectral classes (M, C and S) with a poorly expressed periodicity, i.e. with a different duration of individual cycles (which leads to the impossibility of predicting the epochs of maximum and minimum brightness), or with the replacement of periodical changes by slow irregular variations, or even by the constancy of brightness. Some of them are characterised by a certain mean value of the period, given in the catalogue.	SRB	Semiregular late-type (M, C, S or Me, Ce, Se) giants with poorly defined periodicity (mean cycles in the range of 20 to 2300 days) or with alternating intervals of periodic and slow irregular changes, and even with light constancy intervals. Every star of this type may usually be assigned a certain mean period (cycle), which is the value given in the Catalogue. In a number of cases, the simultaneous presence of two or more periods of light variation is observed	AF Cyg; RR CrB
SRc	semi-regular variable super-giants of late spectral classes	SRC	Spectral-type (M, C, S or Me, Ce, Se) supergiants with amplitudes of about 1 mag and periods of light variation from 30 days to several thousand days.	μ Cep; RW Cyg
SRd	semi-regular variable giants and super-giants belonging to spectral classes F, G, K	SRD	Semiregular variable giants and supergiants of F, G, or K spectral types, sometimes with emission lines in their spectra. Amplitudes of light variation are in the range from 0.1 to 4 mag, and the range of periods is from 30 to 1100 days	S Vul; UU Her; AG Aur; SX Her; SV UMa
		SRS	Semiregular pulsating red giants with short period (several days to a month), probably high-overtone pulsators	AU Ari

== Pulsation ==
The semiregular variable stars, particularly the SRa and SRb sub-classes, are often grouped with the Mira variables under the long-period variable heading. In other situations, the term is expanded to cover almost all cool pulsating stars. The semi-regular giant stars are closely related to the Mira variables: Mira stars generally pulsate in the fundamental mode; semiregular giants pulsate in one or more overtones.

Photometric studies in the Large Magellanic Cloud looking for gravitational microlensing events have shown that essentially all cool evolved stars are variable, with the coolest stars showing very large amplitudes and warmer stars showing only micro-variations. The semiregular variable stars fall on one of five main period–luminosity relationship sequences identified, differing from the Mira variables only in pulsating in an overtone mode. The closely related OSARG (OGLE small amplitude red giant) variables pulsate in an unknown mode.

Many semiregular variables show long secondary periods around ten times the main pulsation period, with amplitudes of a few tenths of a magnitude at visual wavelengths. The cause of the pulsations is not known.

== Bright examples ==
η Gem is the brightest SRa variable, and also an eclipsing binary. GZ Peg is an SRa variable and S-type star with a maximum magnitude of 4.95. T Cen is listed as the next-brightest SRa example, but it is suggested that it may actually be an RV Tauri variable, which would make it by far the brightest member of that class.

There are numerous naked-eye SRb stars, with third-magnitude L^{2} Pup being the brightest listed in the GCVS. σ Lib and ρ Per are also third-magnitude SRb stars at maximum brightness. β Gru is a second magnitude star classified as a slow irregular variable by the GCVS, but reported to be of SRb type by later research. These four are all class M giants, although some SRb variables are carbon stars such as UU Aur or S-type stars such as Pi^{1} Gru.

Catalogued SRc stars are less numerous, but include some of the brightest stars in the sky such as Betelgeuse and α Her. Although SRc stars are defined as being supergiants, a number of them have giant spectral luminosity classes and some such as α Her are known to be asymptotic giant branch stars.

Many SRd stars are extremely luminous hypergiants, including the naked-eye ρ Cas, V509 Cas, and ο^{1} Cen. Others are classified as giant stars, but the brightest example is the seventh-magnitude LU Aqr.

Most SRS variables have been discovered in deep large-scale surveys, but the naked-eye stars V428 And, AV Ari, and EL Psc are also members.

== See also ==
- List of semiregular variable stars
- Low-dimensional chaos in stellar pulsations
- Variable star designation
