= U Hydrae =

Variable star in the constellation Hydra

- Location of U Hydrae (circled in red)

Observation data Epoch J2000 Equinox ICRS
- Constellation: Hydra
- Right ascension: 10^{h} 37^{m} 33.27295^{s}
- Declination: −13° 23′ 04.3529″
- Apparent magnitude (V): 4.56 to 5.40

Characteristics
- Evolutionary stage: AGB
- Spectral type: C-N5 C2 5-
- B−V color index: 2.80±0.51
- Variable type: SRb

Astrometry
Radial velocity (R_{v})	−25.8±1.7 km/s
Proper motion (μ)	RA: +42.59 mas/yr Dec.: −37.72 mas/yr
Parallax (π)	4.80±0.23 mas
Distance	680 ± 30 ly (208 ± 10 pc)
Absolute magnitude (M_{V})	−1.70

Details
Mass	0.75 M_{☉}
Radius	274 – 415 (Note: Applying the Stefan–Boltzmann law with a nominal solar effective temperature of 5,772 K: $\sqrt{\biggl(\frac{5,772}{3,200}\biggr)^4 \cdot 10^{3.85}} = 273.75\ R_\odot$$\sqrt{\biggl(\frac{5,772}{2,600}\biggr)^4 \cdot 10^{3.85}} = 414.67\ R_\odot$.) R_{☉}
Luminosity	3,476 L_{☉}
Surface gravity (log g)	−0.28 cgs
Temperature	2,600–3,200 K
Metallicity [Fe/H]	−0.1 dex

Other designations
- U Hya, BD−12°3218, HD 92055, HIP 52009, HR 4163, SAO 156110

Database references
SIMBAD	data

U Hydrae is a single star in the equatorial constellation of Hydra, near the northern constellation border with Sextans. It is visible to the naked eye under good observing conditions. It is a semiregular variable star of sub-type SRb, with its brightness ranging from visual magnitude (V) 4.7 to 5.2 over a 450-day period, with some irregularity. This object is located at a distance of approximately 680 light years from the Sun based on parallax. It is drifting closer with a radial velocity of −26 km/s.

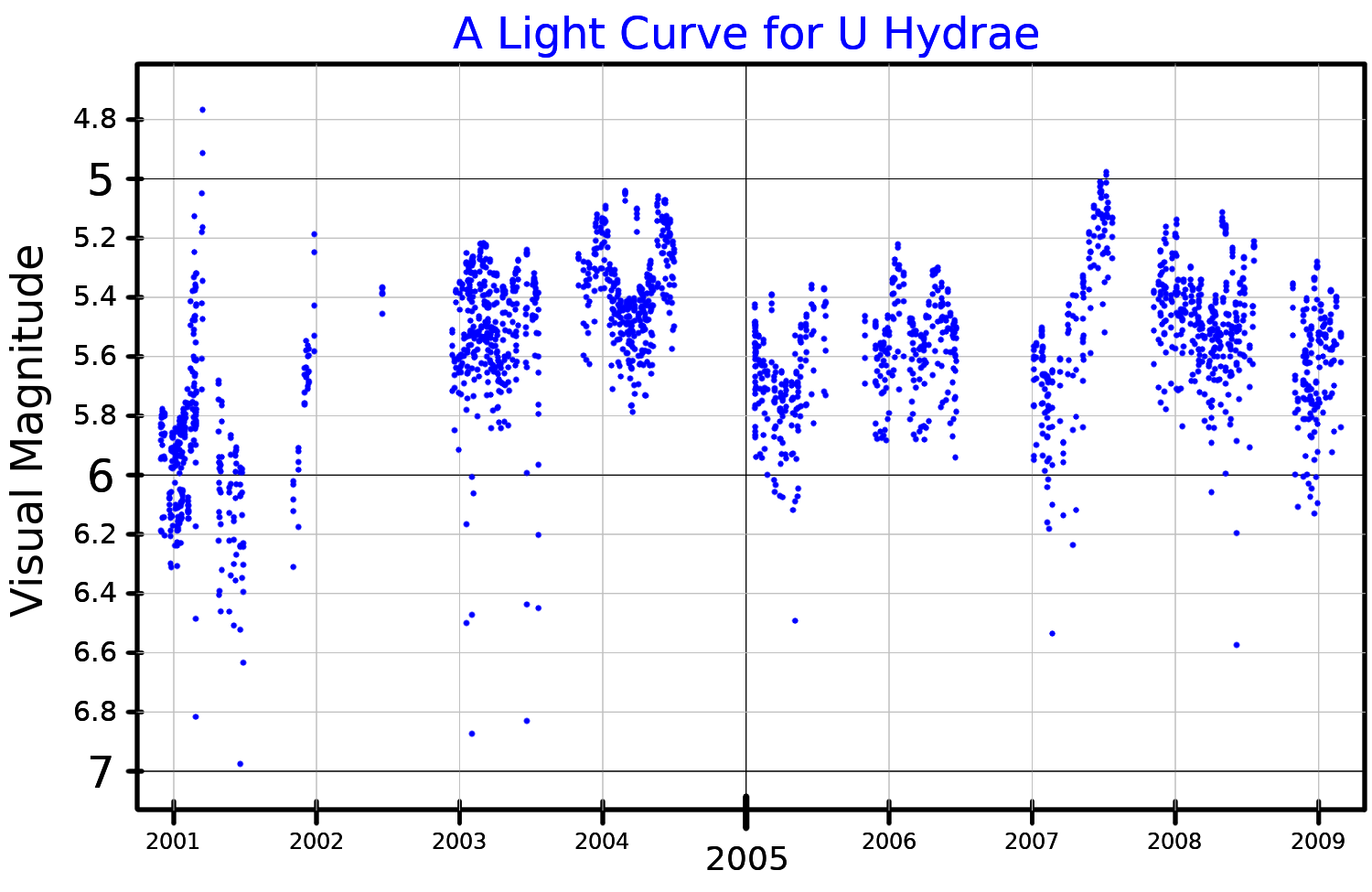
A visual band light curve for U Hydrae, plotted from ASAS data

In 1871, Benjamin Apthorp Gould discovered that the star is a variable star. It was listed with its variable star designation, U Hydrae, in Annie Jump Cannon's 1907 work Second Catalog of Variable Stars.

This is a carbon-rich red giant star on the asymptotic giant branch – a carbon star – with s-process elements appearing in the spectrum. It has a stellar classification of C-N5 with a carbon star class of C2 5-. The star is losing mass at the rate of 1.2×10^{−7} M_{☉}/yr, with an outflow velocity of 6.9 km/s. Technetium has been detected in the spectrum, suggesting the star has experienced a third dredge-up episode due to thermal pulses of the helium-burning shell some time within the last 100,000 years.

An ultraviolet (UV) excess has been detected coming from an extended elliptical ring that surrounds this star. It has a mean angular radius of 110″ and lines up with a detached shell of dusty material that was previously detected in the infrared band. The material was most likely ejected from the star due to mass loss episodes. The probable cause of the UV emission is from the movement of the star through space and possibly shock-excited molecules of H_{2}. The emission does not show a bow-shock-like structure.
