= Chi Cygni =

Star in the constellation Cygnus

- Location of χ Cygni (circled)

Observation data Epoch J2000 Equinox ICRS
- Constellation: Cygnus
- Right ascension: 19^{h} 50^{m} 33.921^{s}
- Declination: +32° 54′ 50.576″
- Apparent magnitude (V): 3.3 to 14.2

Characteristics
- Evolutionary stage: AGB
- Spectral type: S6+/1e = MS6+ (S6,2e – S10,4e)
- U−B color index: −0.30 to +0.98
- B−V color index: +1.56 to +2.05
- Variable type: Mira

Astrometry
Radial velocity (R_{v})	+1.60 km/s
Proper motion (μ)	RA: −24.085 mas/yr Dec.: −41.239 mas/yr
Parallax (π)	6.2686±0.2796 mas
Distance	553 ly (169 pc)
Absolute magnitude (M_{V})	−3.2 to +7.7

Details
Mass	2.1+1.5 −0.7 M_{☉}
Radius	348 to 480 R_{☉}
Luminosity	6,000 to 9,000 L_{☉}
Surface gravity (log g)	0.49 cgs
Temperature	2,441 to 2,742 K
Metallicity [Fe/H]	−1.00 dex

Other designations
- χ Cyg, Chi Cyg, BD+32°3593, HD 187796, HIP 97629, HR 7564, SAO 68943

Database references
SIMBAD	data

Chi Cygni is a Mira variable star in the constellation Cygnus, and also an S-type star. Its name is a Bayer designation that is Latinized from χ Cygni, and abbreviated Chi Cyg or χ Cyg. It is around 500 light years away.

χ Cygni is an asymptotic giant branch star, a very cool and luminous red giant nearing the end of its life. It was discovered to be a variable star in 1686 and its apparent visual magnitude varies from as bright as 3.3 to as dim as 14.2, corresponding to a brightness factor of over 20,000. It is only visible to the naked eye for a short period near each maximum.

== History ==
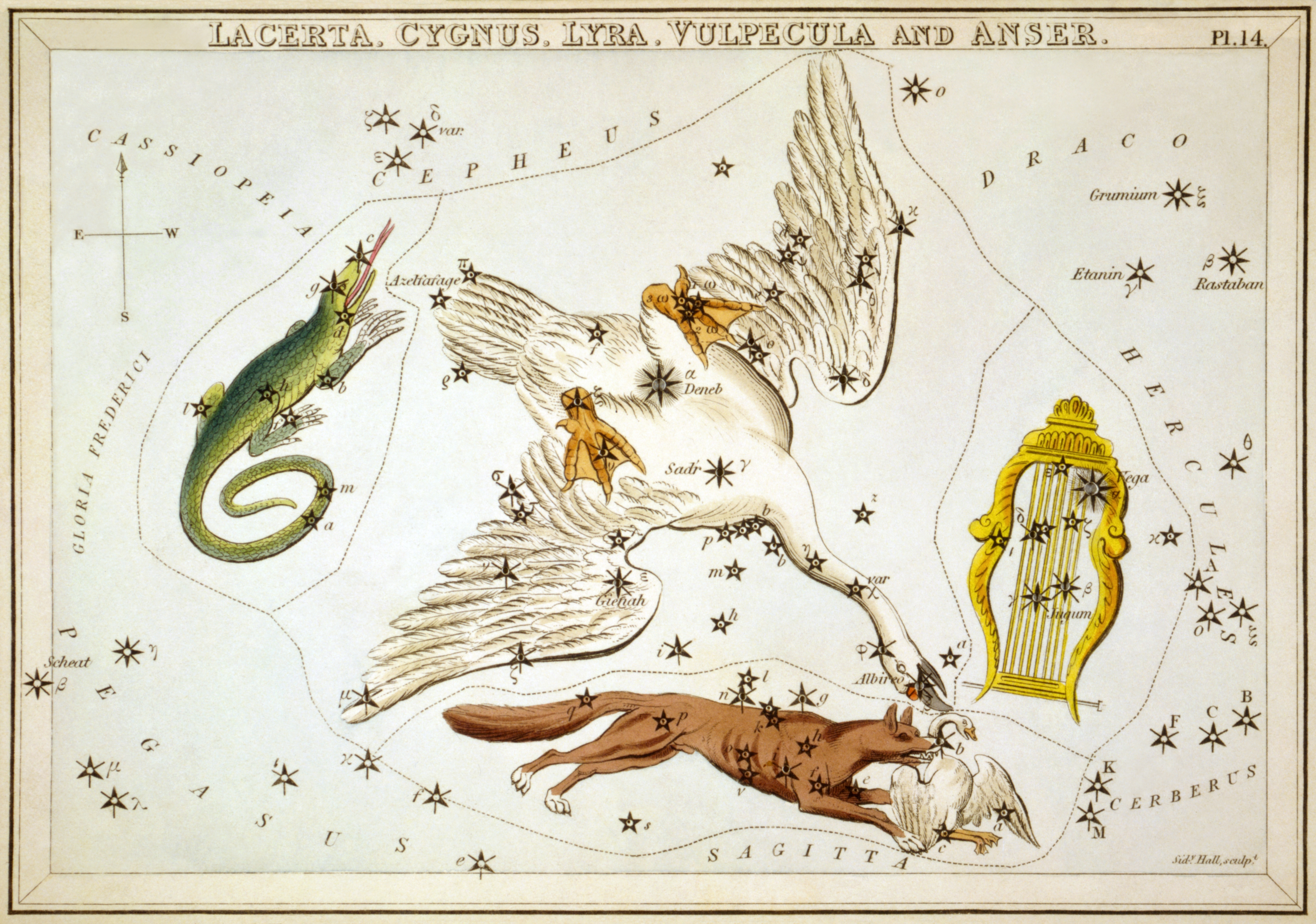
Illustration of Cygnus from Urania's Mirror, with χ marked as variable

Flamsteed recorded that his star 17 Cygni was Bayer's χ Cygni. It is assumed that χ was not visible at that time, but there is no further information and the discrepancy was not noticed until 1816. Bayer had recorded χ Cygni as a 4th magnitude star, presumably near maximum brightness.

The astronomer Gottfried Kirch discovered the variability of χ Cygni in 1686. While researching that area of the sky for observations of Nova Vulpeculae, he noted that the star marked as χ in Bayer's Uranometria atlas was missing. He continued to monitor the area and on October 19, 1686 he recorded it at 5th magnitude.

Kirch regarded χ Cyg as a regular variable with a period of 404.5 days, but it was quickly noted that both the period and amplitude varied considerably from cycle to cycle. Thomas Dick, LL.D, writes:

"The period of this star has been settled by Maraldi and Cassini at 405 days; but from a mean of the observations of Mr. Pigot, it appears to be only 392, or at most 396-7/8 days.

"The particulars relating to it are,

1. When at its full brightness, it undergoes no perceptible change for a fortnight.
2. It is about three and a half months in increasing from the eleventh magnitude to its full brightness, and the same in decreasing; for which reason it may be considered as invisible during six months.
3. It does not always attain the same degree of lustre, being sometimes of the 5th and sometimes of the seventh magnitude.
"It is situated in the neck [of the Swan constellation], and nearly equi-distant from Beta and Gamma, and south by west from Deneb, at the distance of about twelve degrees, and is marked Chi."

The star was then observed only sporadically until the 19th century. A continuous sequence of observations were made by Argelander and Schmidt from 1845 to 1884. These were the first series of observations showing the minima of the light variations. Since the start of the 20th century, it has been monitored closely by multiple observers.

The earliest spectra of χ Cygni could only be taken near maximum light. They show weak absorption lines, with bright emission lines superimposed, and it was typically classified as around M6e at maximum brightness. After the S class was introduced, χ Cygni was considered intermediate between class M and class S, for example either S5e or M6-M8e. Later more sensitive spectra near minimum gave spectral types as late as M10 or S10,1e. Under the revised classification system for S stars, designed to better reflect the gradation between M stars and carbon stars, χ Cygni at normal maximum was classified as S6 Zr2 Ti6 or S6+/1e, considered equivalent to MS6+. Spectral types at different phases of variation ranged from S6/1e to S9/1-e although no measurements were taken at minimum brightness.

SiO masers were detected from χ Cygni in 1975. H_{2}O emission from χ Cygni's atmosphere was detected in 2010, but H_{2}O masers have not been found.

== Variability ==
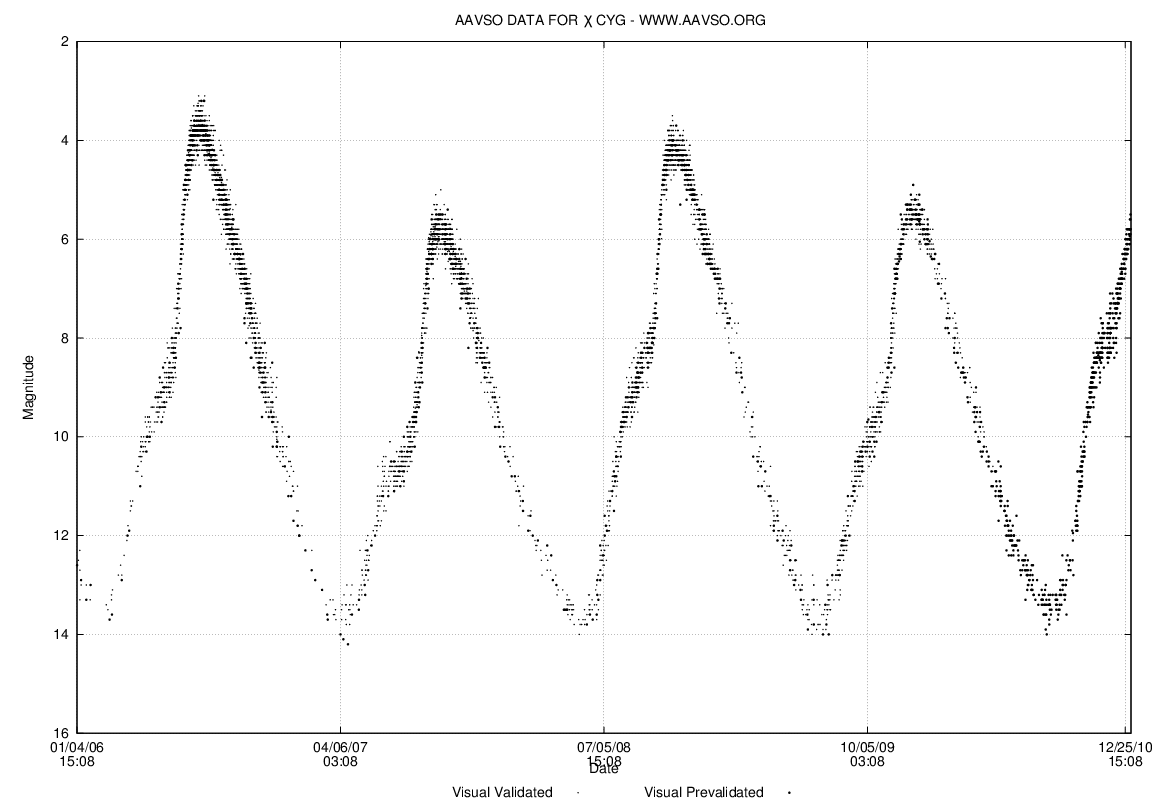
χ Cygni light curve from 2006 to 2010. Note that dates are in the MM/DD/YY format

χ Cygni shows one of the largest variations in apparent magnitude of any pulsating variable star. The observed extremes are 3.3 and 14.2 respectively, a variation of more than 10,000-fold in brightness. The mean maximum brightness is about magnitude 4.8, and the mean minimum is around magnitude 13.4. The shape of the light curve is fairly consistent from cycle to cycle, with the rise being steeper than the fall. There is a "bump" approximately halfway from minimum to maximum, where the brightness increase temporarily slows before rising very quickly to maximum. The faster rise and bump are common features in the light curves of Mira variables with periods longer than 300 days. The rise time is 41–45% of the fall time.

Both the maximum and minimum magnitude varies considerably from cycle to cycle: maxima may be brighter than magnitude 4.0 or fainter than 6.0, and minima fainter than magnitude 14.0 or brighter than magnitude 11.0. The maximum of 2015 may have been the faintest ever observed, barely reaching magnitude 6.5, while less than 10 years earlier the 2006 maximum was the brightest for over a century at magnitude 3.8. Some of the supposed brightest minima may simply be due to incomplete observational coverage. Longterm BAA and AAVSO data show minima consistently between about magnitude 13 and 14 throughout the 20th century.

χ Cygni visualisation

Chi Cygni photographed every ~10days during its 10 magnitude luminosity cycle

The period from maximum to maximum or minimum to minimum is not consistent, and can vary by up to 40 days either side of the mean. The mean period depends on the period of observations used, but is generally taken to be 408.7 days. There is some evidence that the mean period has increased by about 4 days over the last three centuries. Period variations on shorter timescales appear to be random rather than cyclical, although it is possible that the secular period increase is not linear. The period change is only significant when calculated using the maxima and not when using the minima which are only available for more recent cycles.

The spectral type is observed to vary during the brightness changes, from S6 to S10. The earliest spectral types are found at maximum brightness. After maximum, the strength of the emission lines starts to increase. Towards minimum, emission becomes very strong and many unusual forbidden and molecular lines appear.

The diameter of χ Cygni can be measured directly using interferometry. Observations show that the diameter varies from around 19 mas to 26 mas. The size changes are almost in phase with the brightness and spectral type. The smallest size is observed at phase 0.94, which is 30 days before the maximum.

== Distance ==
The annual parallax of χ Cygni has been calculated at 5.53 mas in the new reduction of Hipparcos satellite data, which corresponds to a distance of 590 light years. The parallax is only about a quarter of the angular diameter of the star. The statistical margin of error is about 20%.

The distance can also be derived by comparing changes in the angular diameter with the measured radial velocity in the atmosphere. This gives a parallax of 5.9 mas with a similar accuracy to the direct measurement, corresponding to a distance of 550 light years.

Older studies generally derived smaller distances such as 345, 370, or 430 lights years. The original parallax calculated from Hipparcos measurements was 9.43 mas, indicating a distance of 346 light years.

Comparing the apparent magnitude of χ Cygni with an absolute magnitude calculated from the period–luminosity relationship gives a distance compatible with the latest parallax values.

== Properties ==
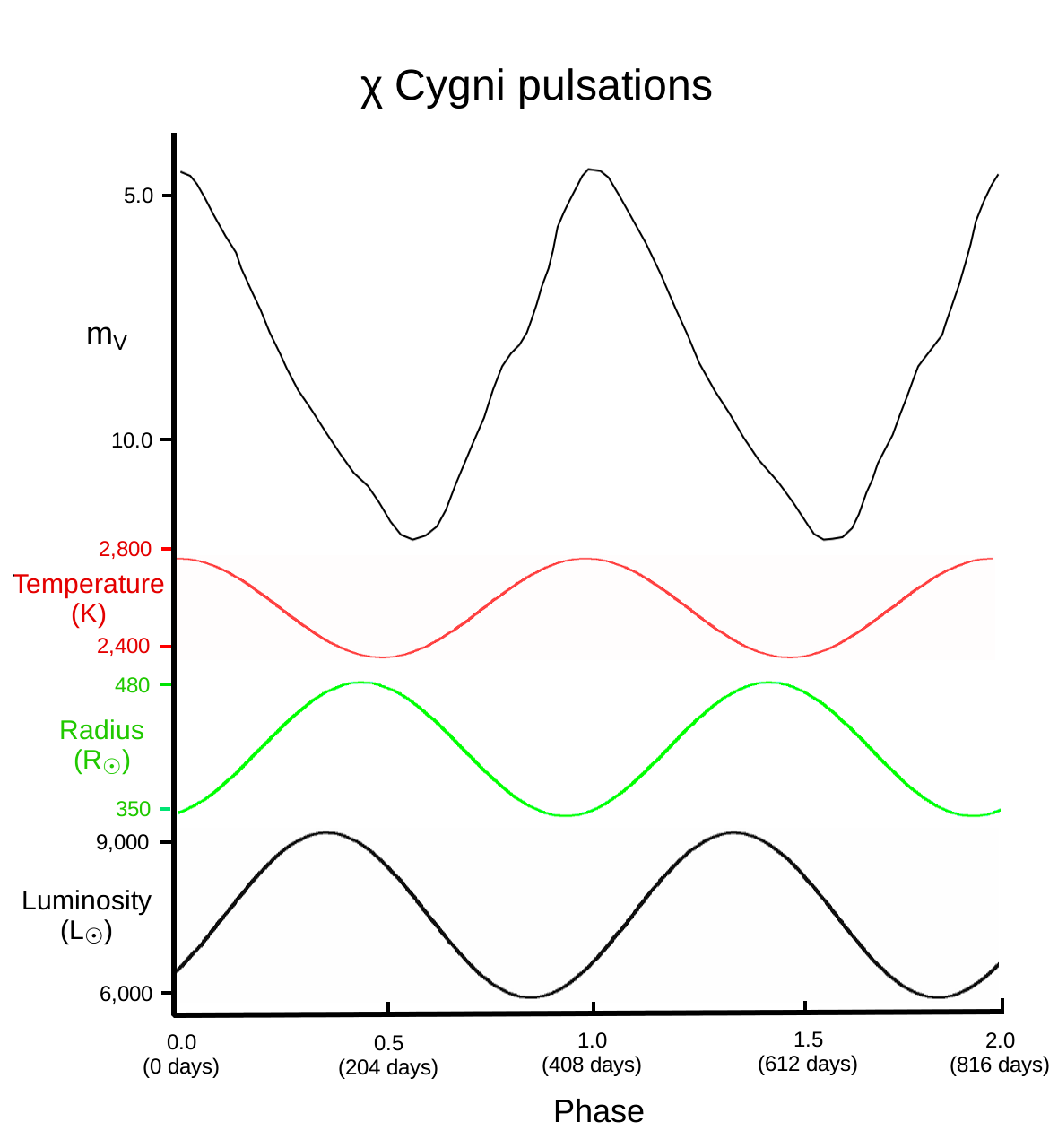
Changes in the visual magnitude, temperature, radius, and bolometric luminosity as χ Cygni pulsates

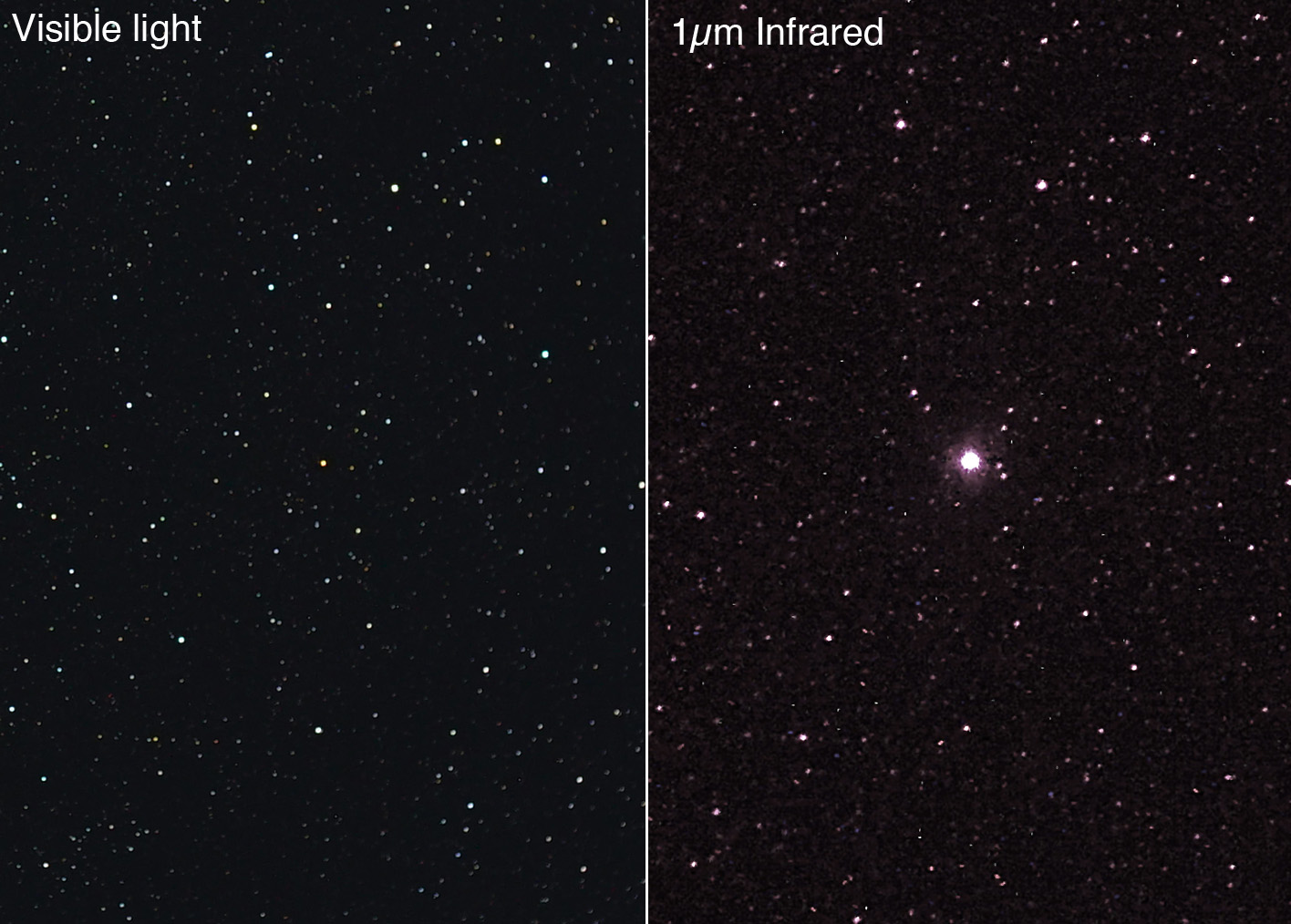
The spectacular dimming of Chi Cygni is largely driven by a wavelength shift during its cycle. Even when very dim in visible light it's bright in the infrared.

χ Cygni is much larger and cooler than the sun, so large that it is thousands of times more luminous despite the low temperature. It pulsates, with both the radius and temperature varying over approximately 409 days. The temperature varies from about 2,400 K to about 2,700 K and the radius varies from about 350 R_{☉} to 480 R_{☉}. These pulsations cause the luminosity of the star to vary from about 6,000 L_{☉} to 9,000 L_{☉}, but they cause the visual brightness to vary by over 10 magnitudes. The huge visual magnitude range is created by a shift of electromagnetic radiation from the infrared as the temperature increases, and by formation at cool temperatures of molecules that absorb visual light.

The visual magnitude of the star is closely correlated with the changes in the spectral type and temperature. The radius is almost anti-correlated with the temperature. The minimum radius occurs approximately 30 days before the maximum temperature. The bolometric luminosity variation is primarily driven by the change in the size of the star, with the maximum luminosity occurring about 57 days before the maximum radius and lowest temperature are reached. The luminosity varies over a quarter of a cycle behind the visual brightness, meaning the star is fainter at maximum luminosity than at minimum luminosity.

The mass of isolated stars is difficult to determine accurately. In the case of χ Cygni, its pulsations offer a way to directly measure the gravitation acceleration of layers in the atmosphere. The mass measured in this way is 2.1 M_{☉}. Applying an empirical period/mass/radius relation for Mira stars to χ Cygni gives a mass of 3.1 M_{☉}. χ Cygni is losing mass at a rate of nearly a millionth M_{☉} each year through a stellar wind at 8.5 km/s.

χ Cygni is usually classified as an S-type star because of the bands of zirconium oxide and titanium oxide in its spectrum. Compared to other S stars, the ZrO bands are weak and bands from VO are visible, so that the spectrum is sometimes described as MS, intermediate between a normal M spectrum and the S type. It also shows spectral lines from s-process elements such as technetium, produced naturally in AGB stars such as Mira variables. S stars are an intermediate phase between M class stars which have atmospheres with more oxygen than carbon, and carbon stars which have more carbon in their atmospheres. The carbon is moved into the atmosphere by third dredge-ups which occur with thermal pulses. S stars have C/O ratios between about 0.95 and 1.05. The C/O ratio in χ Cygni's atmosphere is 0.95, consistent with its status as a borderline S/MS star.

χ Cygni is the first Mira star to have a magnetic field detected. It is believed that the very weak magnetic field normally found in AGB stars is amplified by the shock wave during the pulsations of the star's atmosphere.

== Evolution ==
Evolutionary track for an intermediate mass star similar to χ Cygni

χ Cygni is a luminous and variable red giant on the asymptotic giant branch (AGB). This means it has exhausted its core helium, but is not massive enough to start burning heavier elements and is currently fusing hydrogen and helium in concentric shells. Specifically it is on the thermally pulsing portion of the AGB (TP-AGB) which occurs when the helium shell is close to the hydrogen shell and undergoes periodic flashes as it stops fusion for a time and new material accumulates from the hydrogen-burning shell.

AGB stars become more luminous, larger, and cooler as they lose mass and the internal shells move closer to the surface. Mass loss increases as the mass decreases, the luminosity increases, and more fusion products are dredged up to the surface. They "ascend" the AGB until the mass loss becomes so extreme that they start to increase in temperature and enter the post-AGB phase, eventually to become a white dwarf.

The evolution of a Mira variable should cause its period to increase, assuming it stays with the unstable region of pulsations. However, this secular trend is interrupted by the thermal pulses. These thermal pulses occur tens of thousands of years apart, but are theorised to produce rapid period changes over less than a thousand years following the pulse. The period changes detected for χ Cygni are suggestive of the end of that rapid change from a thermal pulse. The period changes between pulses are too slow to be detected with current observations.

Thermal pulses on the TP-AGB produce progressively more dramatic changes until the end of the AGB phase. Each pulse causes internal instability which triggers convection from the surface towards the hydrogen shell. When this convection zone becomes deep enough, it moves fusion products from the shell to the surface. This is known as the third dredge-up although there can be several third dredge-ups. The appearance of these fusion products at the surface is responsible for the change of an M star to an S star, and ultimately to a carbon star.

The initial mass and age of an AGB star are difficult to derive accurately. Intermediate mass stars lose relatively little mass, less than 10%, up to the start of the AGB, but have strong mass loss on the AGB, especially the TP-AGB. Stars with very different initial masses can show very similar properties on the AGB. A star initially with 3 M_{☉} will take around 400 million years to reach the AGB, then around 6 million years to reach the TP-AGB, and spend one million years in the TP-AGB phase. It will lose around 0.1 M_{☉} before the TP-AGB and 0.5 M_{☉} on the TP-AGB. The carbon-oxygen core of 0.6 M_{☉} will go on to become a white dwarf and the remaining envelope will be shed to possibly become a planetary nebula.
