= Pi1 Gruis =

Semiregular variable star in the constellation Grus

π^{1} Gruis
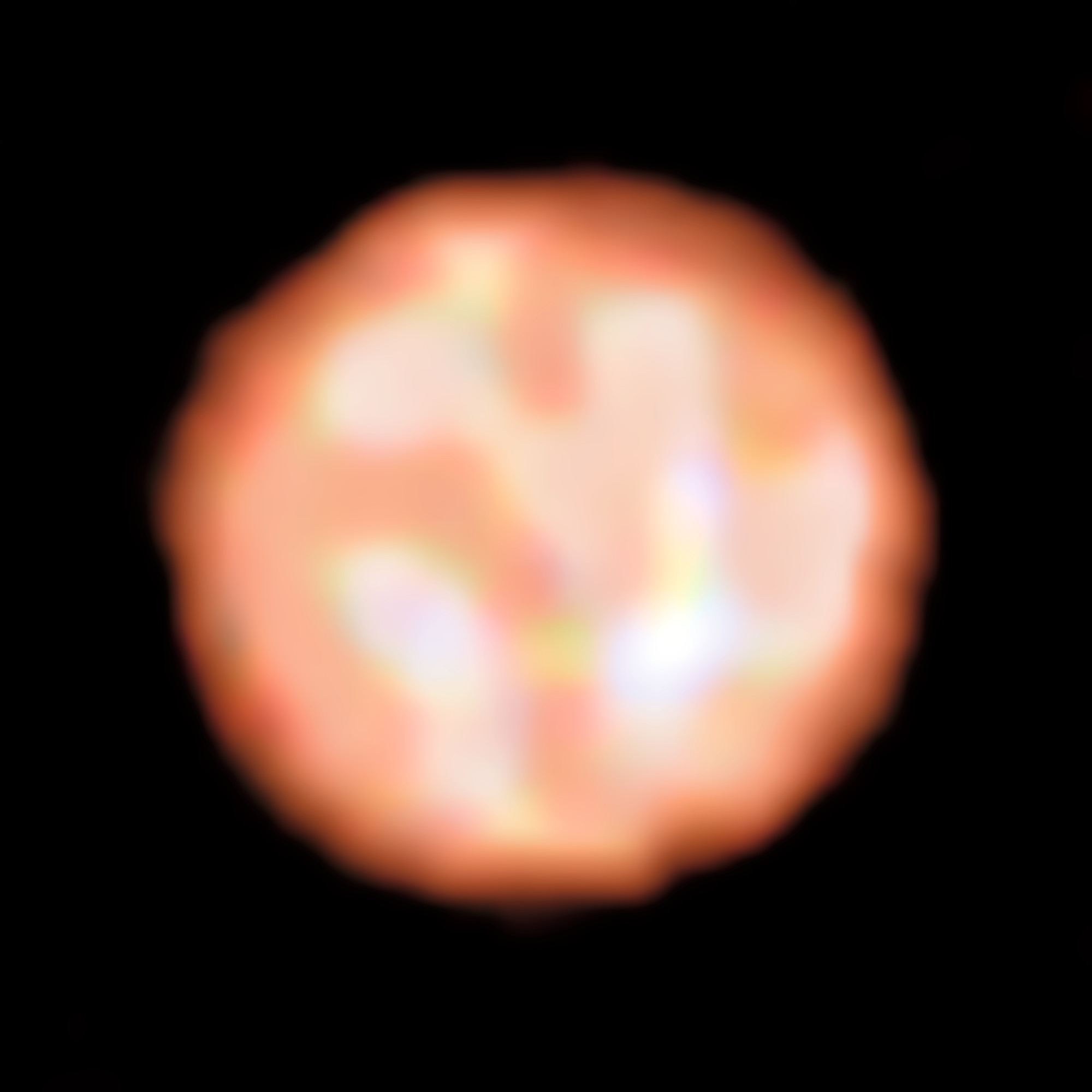
- Surface of the red giant star π1 Gruis.

Observation data Epoch J2000 Equinox ICRS
- Constellation: Grus
- Right ascension: 22^{h} 22^{m} 44.20571^{s}
- Declination: −45° 56′ 52.6115″
- Apparent magnitude (V): 5.31 - 7.01 + 10.4

Characteristics
- Evolutionary stage: AGB + main sequence
- Spectral type: S5,7: + G0V + F8V
- Variable type: SRb

Astrometry
| Radial velocity (R_{v}) | −14.8±1.0 km/s |
| Proper motion (μ) | RA: +45.20±0.14 mas/yr Dec.: −18.78±0.06 mas/yr |
| Parallax (π) | 5.555±0.309 mas |
| Distance | 590 ± 30 ly (180 ± 10 pc) |
| Absolute magnitude (M_{V}) | B: +4.3 |

Orbit
| Primary | A |
| Name | B |
| Period (P) | 6,200 years |
| Semi-major axis (a) | 2.8" (460 AU) |

Orbit
| Primary | A |
| Name | C |
| Period (P) | 11.76±1.85 years |
| Semi-major axis (a) | 6.81±0.49 AU |
| Eccentricity (e) | 0 |
| Inclination (i) | 11±7° |
| Longitude of the node (Ω) | 101±36° |
| Periastron epoch (T) | 2016.39±1.18 |

Details

A
| Mass | 1.12±0.25 M_{☉} |
| Radius | 334±20 R_{☉} |
| Luminosity | 7,300±2,100 L_{☉} |
| Surface gravity (log g) | −0.56±0.11 cgs |
| Temperature | 2,900±200 K |

B
| Mass | 1.06 M_{☉} |
| Radius | 1.10 R_{☉} |
| Luminosity | 1.35 L_{☉} |
| Temperature | 5,930 K |

C
| Mass | 1.18±0.27 M_{☉} |
| Radius | 1.31±0.09 R_{☉} |
| Luminosity | 2.25±0.10 L_{☉} |
| Surface gravity (log g) | 4.3±0.2 cgs |
| Temperature | 6,100±120 K |

Other designations
- CD−46°14292, HR 8521, HD 212087, SAO 231105, HIP 110478

Database references
| SIMBAD | data |

Pi^{1} Gruis (π^{1} Gruis) is a semiregular variable star in the constellation Grus around 590 light-years from Earth. It forms a close double star with π^{2} Gru four arc-minutes away.

== Characteristics ==
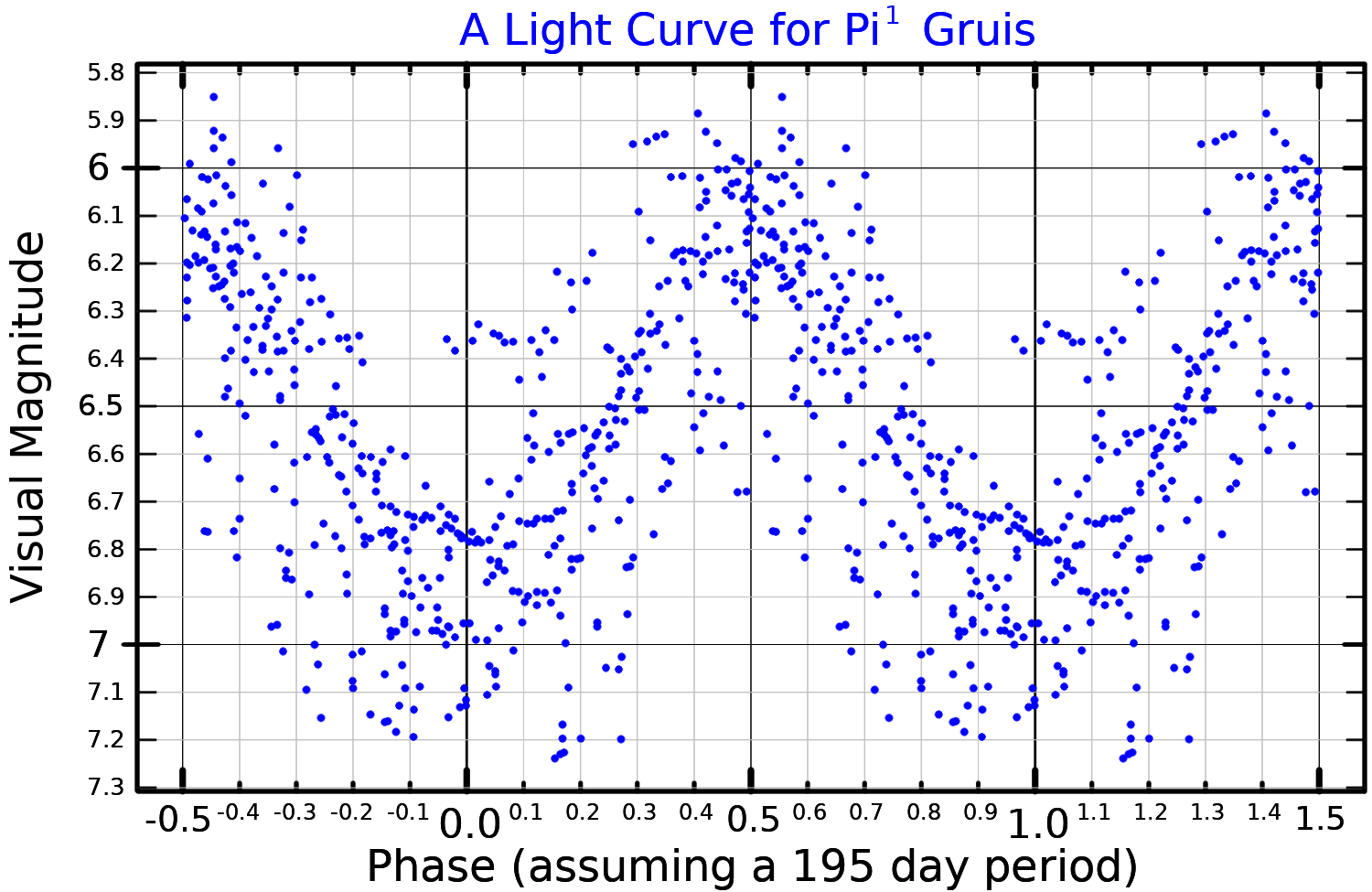
A visual band light curve for π^{1} Gruis, adapted from Mayer et al. (2014)

π^{1} Gruis is an asymptotic giant branch (AGB) star of spectral type S5. It is one of the brightest members of a class of stars known as S stars. It is also a semi-regular variable star ranging from apparent magnitude 5.3 to 7.0 over a period of 198.8 days.

An ageing star, π^{1} Gruis is thought to be well on its way transitioning from a red giant to a planetary nebula. A shell of material has been detected at a distance of 0.91 light-years (0.28 parsecs), which is estimated to have been ejected 21,000 years ago. Closer to the star, there appears to be a cavity within 200 AU, suggesting a drop off in the ejection of material in the past 90 years. The presence of companions makes the shape of the shell irregular rather than spherical.

The star has a measured diameter of 18.37 milliarcseconds, corresponding to a size 334 times that of the Sun.

== Companions ==
π^{1} Gruis has two companion stars forming a gravitationally bound stellar system.

The inner, named π^{1} Gruis C, is 6.8 AU away from the primary, following a circular orbit with an orbital period of 11 years. It is considered to be a likely main sequence star with a mass of 1.18 M_{☉}. It is accreting matter from the red giant primary, having its own accretion disk.

The outer companion, named π^{1} Gruis B, is of apparent magnitude 10.9 and is sunlike in properties—a yellow main sequence star of spectral type G0V. Separated by 2.71″ (projected separation of 453±33 AU), the pair is thought to be gravitationally bound.

== History of observations ==
Location of π^{1} Gruis (circled in red)

The star was catalogued by French explorer and astronomer Nicolas Louis de Lacaille in 1756 but not given a name. Instead, he gave the Bayer designation of "π Gruis" to π^{2}. It was Thomas Brisbane who designated this star as π^{1}. Annie Jump Cannon was the first to report its unusual spectrum, sending a plate of its spectrograph made in 1895 to Paul W. Merrill and noting its similarity to R Andromedae. Merrill selected these two stars along with R Cygni to be the three prototypes of the S star class. π^{1} Gruis was one of the first 17 stars defined as S-stars by Merrill in 1922; the only star not observed from Mount Wilson due to its southerly location in the sky. Analysis of its spectrum showed bands indicating the presence of technetium, as well as oxides of zirconium, lanthanum, cerium and yttrium but not titanium nor barium which have been recorded in other S stars.
