= Technetium star =

Type of celestial body

A technetium star, or more properly a Tc-rich star, is a star whose stellar spectrum contains absorption lines of the radioactive metal technetium. The most stable isotope of technetium is ^{97}Tc with a half-life of 4.21 million years: too short a time to last for the age of the Earth (about 4.5 billion years). Therefore, the detection in 1952 of technetium in stellar spectra, was unambiguous proof of nucleosynthesis in stars, one of the more extreme cases being the star R Geminorum.

Stars containing technetium belong to the class of asymptotic giant branch stars (AGB)—stars that are like red giants, but with a slightly higher luminosity, and which burn hydrogen in an inner shell. Members of this class of stars switch to helium shell burning with an interval of some 100,000 years, in "dredge-ups". Technetium stars belong to the classes M, MS, S, SC and C-N. They are most often variable stars of the long period variable types.

Current research indicates that the presence of technetium in AGB stars occurs after some evolution and that a significant number of these stars do not exhibit the metal in their spectra. The presence of technetium seems to be related to the "third dredge-up" in the history of the stars. In between the thermal pulses of these RGB stars, heavy elements are formed in the region between the hydrogen and helium fusing shells via the slow neutron capture process; the s-process. The materials are then brought to the surface via deep convection events. ^{99}Tc, an isotope with a half-life of only 200,000 years, is produced in AGB stars and brought to the surface during thermal pulses. Its presence is taken as a reliable indicator that a third dredge-up has taken place.

== See also ==
- Barium star – Class of star
- Carbon star – Star whose atmosphere contains more carbon than oxygen
- Mercury–manganese star – Type of star with a prominent spectral line due to absorption from ionized mercury
- S-type star – Type of cool giant star
