= NGC 5882 =

Small planetary nebula in the constellation Lupus

Emission nebula
- Planetary nebula
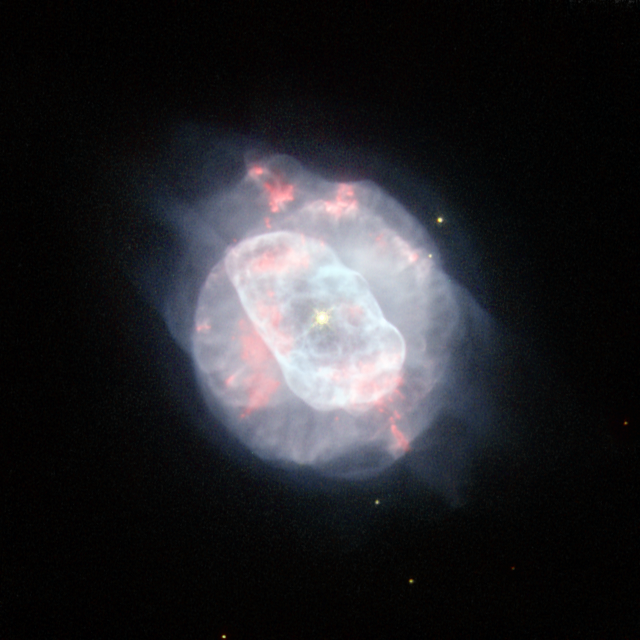
- A Hubble Space Telescope (HST) image of NGC 5882. Credit: HST/NASA/ESA.

Observation data: J2000 epoch
- Right ascension: 15^{h} 16^{m} 49.95679^{s}
- Declination: −45° 38′ 58.6109″
- Distance: 7.7 kly (2.4 kpc) ly
- Apparent dimensions (V): 13–14″
- Constellation: Lupus
- Designations: ESO 274-7, IC 1108, NGC 5882

NGC 5882 is a small planetary nebula in the southern constellation of Lupus, positioned about 1.5° to the southwest of the star Epsilon Lupi. It was discovered by English astronomer John Herschel on July 2, 1834 from the Cape of Good Hope observatory. John L. E. Dreyer described it as "very small, round, quite sharp". It is located at a distance of approximately 7.7 kilolight-years from the Sun.

This nebular region consists of the cast-off outer atmosphere of an aging star. It is roughly elliptical in shape with several clumps of ionized material, and is surrounded by a larger region of low-level emission that extends for three times the nominal diameter of the main nebula. The nebula is expanding with an average velocity of 12.5 km/s. It consists of two shells: the inner shell is elliptical and measures 11″ × 6″, while the more rapidly expanding outer shell is rounder with a diameter of 15″. The inner shell has what appears to be multiple bubble-like shapes. The clumps in the outer shell may be the result of instabilities.

The elemental abundances of the nebula are very similar to those in the Sun, except for a times two enrichment of nitrogen. The latter suggests that the central star did not go through second dredge-up. The central star has an apparent visual magnitude of 13.43. It shines with 830 times the luminosity of the Sun and has 22.7% of the Sun's radius. It is displaced slightly from the center of symmetry for the nebula.
