= U Camelopardalis =

Star in the constellation Camelopardalis

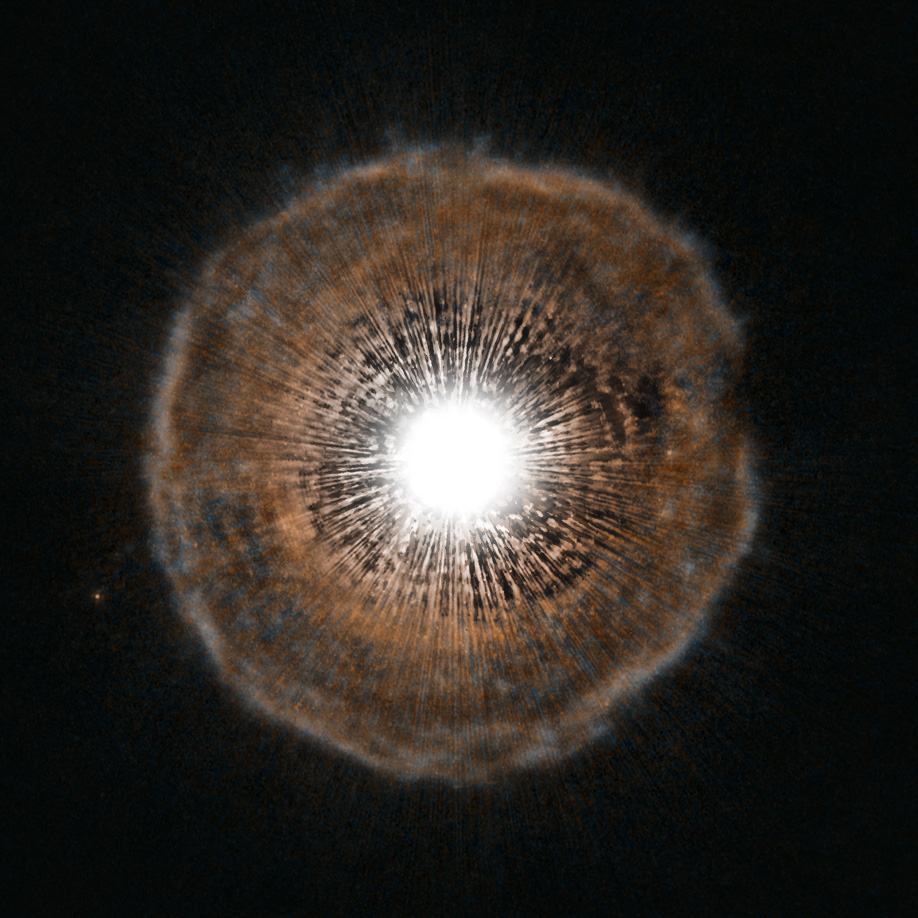
- U Camelopardalis is a bright star surrounded by a tenuous shell of gas. Its atmosphere contains more carbon than oxygen.

Observation data Epoch J2000 Equinox ICRS
- Constellation: Camelopardalis
- Right ascension: 03^{h} 41^{m} 48.17393^{s}
- Declination: +62° 38′ 54.3906″
- Apparent magnitude (V): 7.0 to 9.4

Characteristics
- Evolutionary stage: AGB
- Spectral type: C-N5_{5.5} (MS4)
- U−B color index: +3.50
- B−V color index: +1.95
- Variable type: SRb

Astrometry
Radial velocity (R_{v})	-3.00 km/s
Proper motion (μ)	RA: 3.50 mas/yr Dec.: -3.62 mas/yr
Parallax (π)	1.03±0.59 mas
Distance	530 pc
Absolute magnitude (M_{V})	−2.4 (max)

Details
Luminosity	8,472 L_{☉}
Temperature	3,000 K

Other designations
- U Cam, BD+62°596, HD 22611, HIP 17257, SAO 12870, GC 4371

Database references
SIMBAD	data

U Camelopardalis is a semiregular variable star in the constellation Camelopardalis. Based on parallax measurements made by the Hipparcos spacecraft, it is located about 3,000 light-years (1,000 parsecs) away from the Earth. Its apparent visual magnitude is about 8, which is dim enough that it cannot be seen with the unaided eye.

The spectral type of U Camelopardalis in the revised MK system is C-N5, which indicates a classical carbon star spectrum approximately corresponding to late K or early M. The C_{2} index is 5.5 which is typical of a C-N star. It is also given an alternative spectral type of MS4, indicating a star similar to an M4 class but with somewhat enhanced ZrO bands. The spectral type may vary between C3,9 and C6,4e.

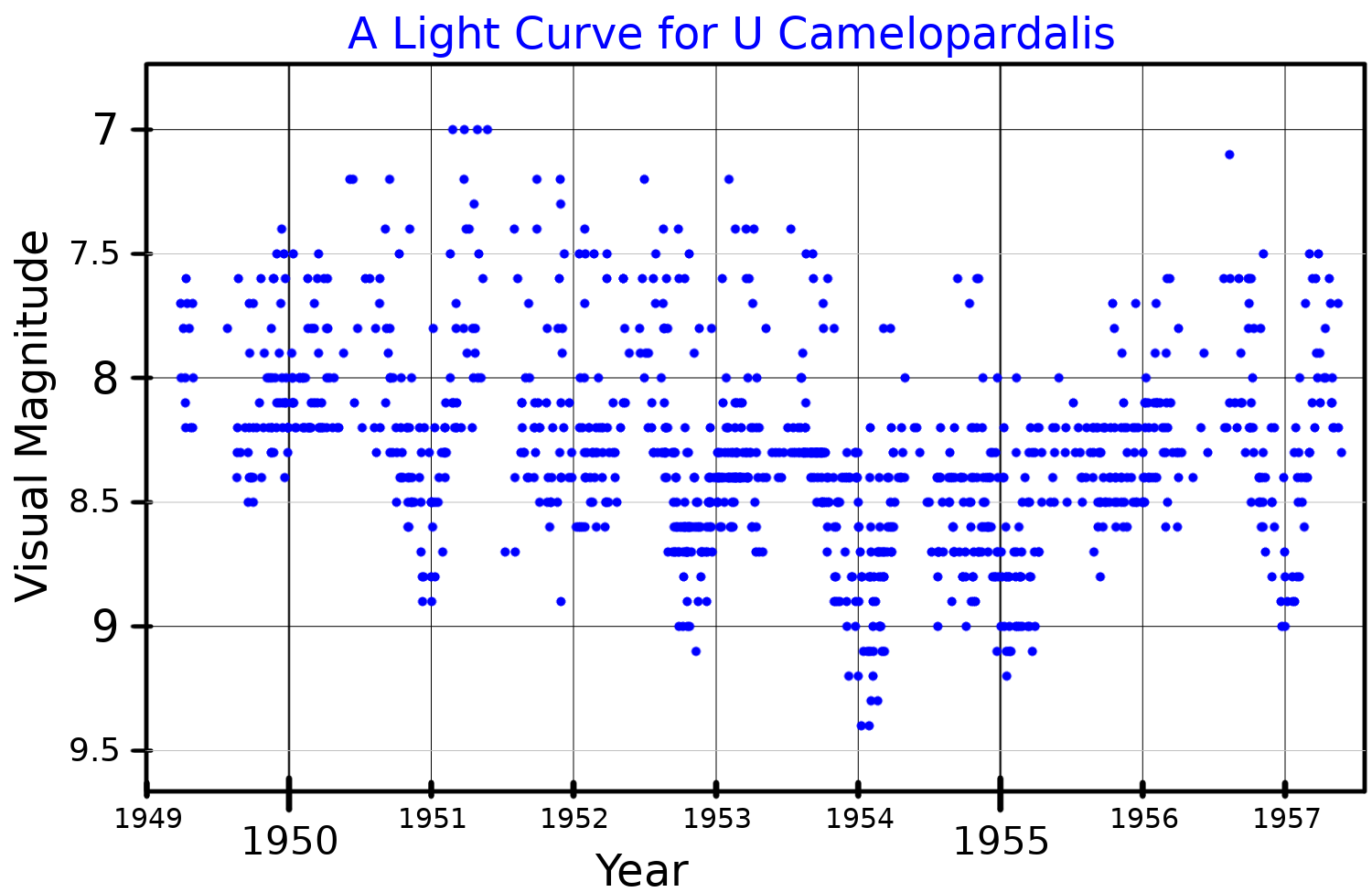
A visual band light curve for U Camelopardalis, plotted from AAVSO data

In 1891, Williamina Fleming announced that the star (then known as DM +62°.596) is a variable star, based on 13 photographs taken in 1890 and 1891. It was listed with its variable star designation, U Camelopardalis, in Annie Jump Cannon's 1907 work Second Catalog of Variable Stars. U Camelopardalis is a carbon star. These types of stars have greater levels of carbon in their atmospheres than oxygen, which means they form carbon compounds that make the star appear strikingly red. U Camelopardalis is nearly 4 magnitudes fainter at blue wavelengths than in the centre of the visual range. In the infrared K band it has an apparent magnitude of 0.37. Its brightness varies without a dominant period and it is classified as semi-regular, although a period of 400 days has been published. In the V photometric band the brightness varies by around half a magnitude, but the amplitude is nearly two magnitudes at blue wavelengths. The maximum visual magnitude has been given as 7.2.

The shell of gas surrounding U Camelopardalis was imaged by the Hubble Space Telescope in 2012, showing a nearly perfect sphere of gas surrounding the star.

U Camelopardalis has a 10th magnitude companion 308" away. It is a B8 main sequence star, hotter but less luminous than U Cam itself. They are not thought to be physically associated.
