= TT Cygni =

Star in the constellation Cygnus

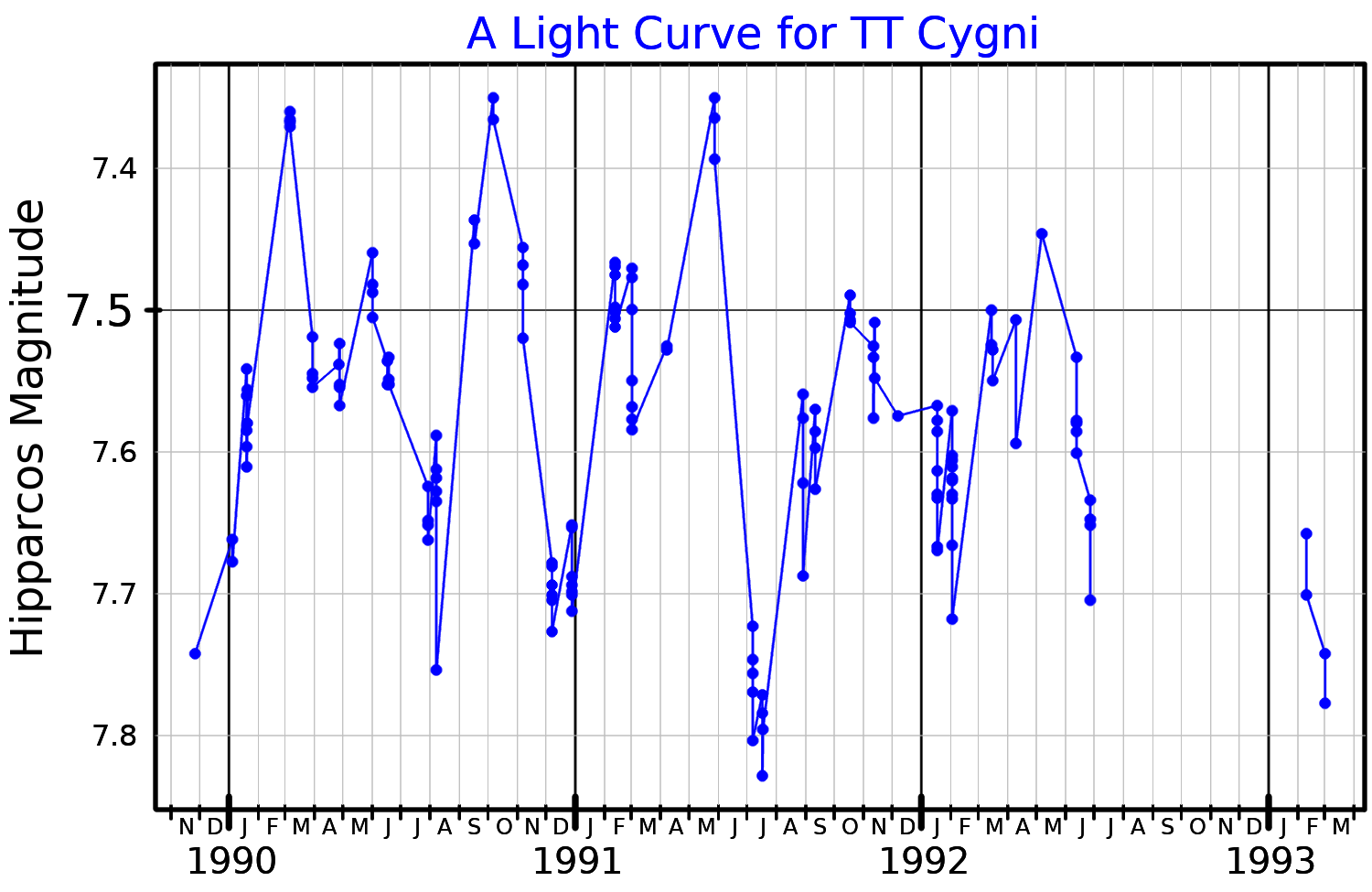
- A light curve for TT Cygni, plotted from Hipparcos data

Observation data Epoch J2000.0 Equinox ICRS
- Constellation: Cygnus
- Right ascension: 19^{h} 40^{m} 57.01599^{s}
- Declination: +32° 37′ 05.7555″
- Apparent magnitude (V): 7.26 - 8.0

Characteristics
- Evolutionary stage: AGB
- Spectral type: C5,4e(N3e)
- B−V color index: +2.917±0.073
- Variable type: SRb

Astrometry
Radial velocity (R_{v})	−49.0±3.1 km/s
Proper motion (μ)	RA: −5.178 mas/yr Dec.: −1.832 mas/yr
Parallax (π)	1.4908±0.0368 mas
Distance	2,190 ± 50 ly (670 ± 20 pc)
Absolute magnitude (M_{V})	−1.297 (var.)

Details
Mass	3.4 M_{☉}
Radius	166 R_{☉}
Luminosity	2,735 L_{☉}
Surface gravity (log g)	−0.4 cgs
Temperature	3,200 K
Metallicity [Fe/H]	−9.49 dex

Other designations
- TT Cyg, BD+32°3522, HD 186047, HIP 96836, SAO 68688

Database references
SIMBAD	data

TT Cygni is a carbon star located 561 parsecs (1,830 ly) away in the northern constellation of Cygnus. It is classified as a semiregular variable of subtype SRb that ranges in brightness from magnitude 7.26 down to 8.0 with a period of 118 days. This object is called a carbon star because it has a high ratio of carbon to oxygen in its surface layers. The carbon was produced by helium fusion, dredged up from inside the star by deep convection triggered by a flash from the helium shell.

In 1898 it was announced that Louisa Dennison Wells had discovered that the star, then known as BD +32°3522, is a variable star. It was listed with its variable star designation, TT Cygni, in Annie Jump Cannon's 1907 work Second Catalog of Variable Stars.

A thin spherical shell around the star, about half a light year across, was emitted 7,000 years ago. It was first detected from its carbon monoxide emission and has a mass around four thousandths M_{☉}, of which about a tenth is dust. The dust is thought to be mostly amorphous carbon.
