= BD Camelopardalis =

Star in the constellation Camelopardalis

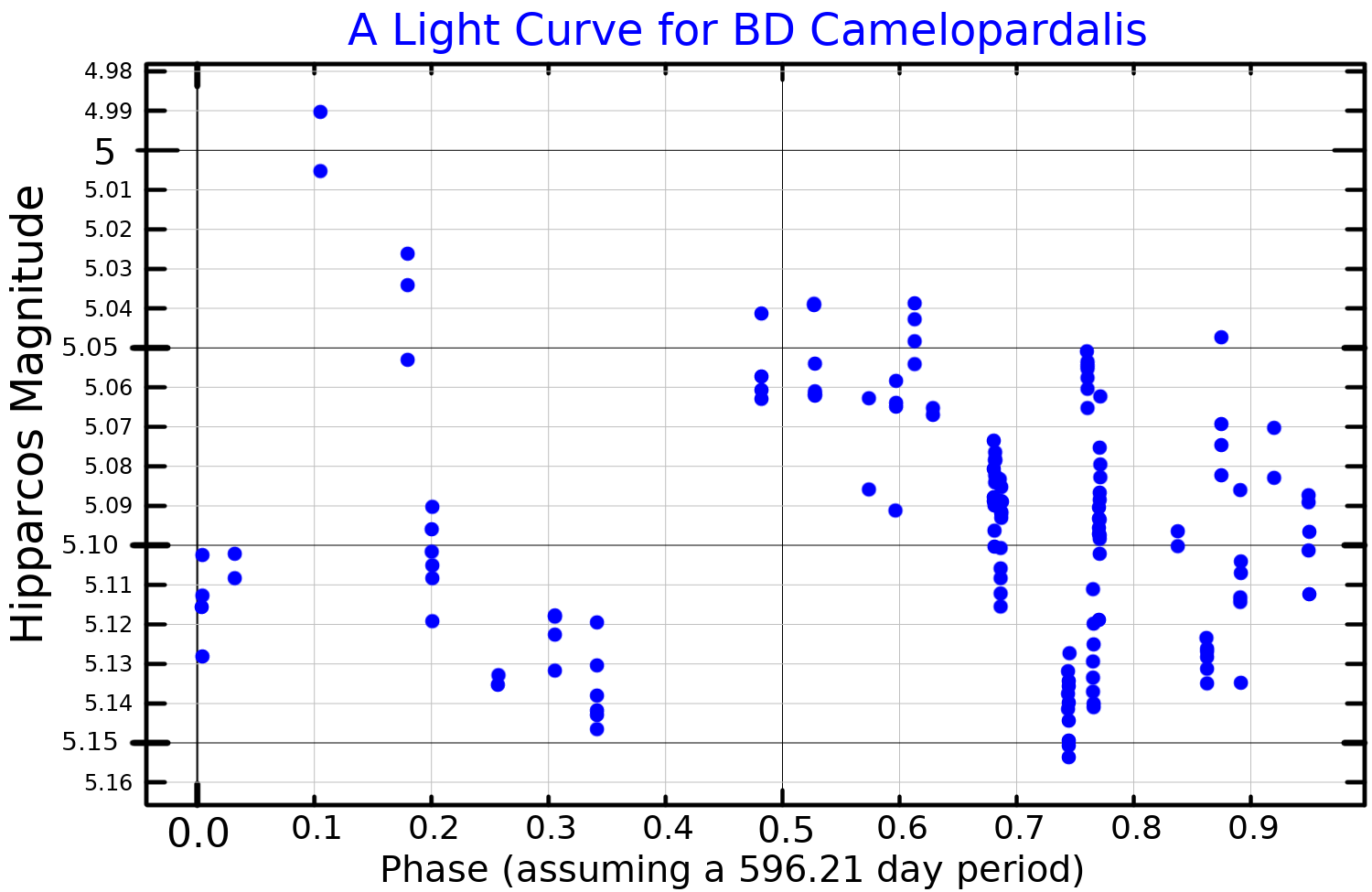
- A light curve for BD Camelopardalis from Hipparcos data, adapted from Adelman (1998)

Observation data Epoch J2000 Equinox ICRS
- Constellation: Camelopardalis
- Right ascension: 03^{h} 42^{m} 09.32551^{s}
- Declination: +63° 13′ 00.4686″
- Apparent magnitude (V): 5.11

Characteristics
- Evolutionary stage: AGB
- Spectral type: S3.5/2 (M4III)
- U−B color index: 1.82
- B−V color index: 1.63
- R−I color index: 1.39
- Variable type: Lb

Astrometry
Radial velocity (R_{v})	−22.28 km/s
Proper motion (μ)	RA: −17.877 mas/yr Dec.: +20.052 mas/yr
Parallax (π)	4.2671±0.2581 mas
Distance	750+36 −49 ly (231+11 −15 pc)
Absolute magnitude (M_{V})	−0.90

Orbit
Primary	BD Cam A
Name	BD Cam B
Period (P)	596.2 days
Semi-major axis (a)	436+43 −42 R_{☉}
Eccentricity (e)	0.088
Inclination (i)	105.6°
Longitude of the node (Ω)	162.1°
Periastron epoch (T)	2442794.5
Argument of periastron (ω) (secondary)	334.3°

Details

BD Cam A
Mass	2.34+0.85 −0.67 M_{☉}
Radius	136±8 R_{☉}
Luminosity	2,780+530 −450 L_{☉}
Surface gravity (log g)	1.5 cgs
Temperature	3,600±120 K
Metallicity [Fe/H]	−0.10+0.27 −0.26 dex

BD Cam B
Mass	0.75+0.16 −0.14 M_{☉}

Other designations
- BD Cam, SAO 12874, BD+62°597, HD 22649, HIP 17296, FK5 129, HR 1105

Database references
SIMBAD	data

BD Camelopardalis is an S star and symbiotic star in the constellation Camelopardalis. It is a 5th magnitude star, and is visible to the naked eye under good observing conditions. It was recognized as a spectroscopic binary star in 1922, and its orbital solution published in 1984; it has a 596-day orbital period. A spectroscopic composition analysis was done of the red giant primary star in 1986.

== Description ==
Although the star's spectrum shows the spectral features of zirconium oxide which define spectral class S, BD Cam shows no technetium lines in its spectrum. It is believed to be an "extrinsic" S star, one whose s-process element excesses originate in a binary companion star.

In 1928, Joel Stebbins and Charles Morse Huffer announced that the star, then called HR 1105, is a variable star, based on observations made at Washburn Observatory. It was given its variable star designation, BD Camelopardalis, in 1977. The system displays only minimal variations in the visible, but the presence of the companion and its interactions with the stellar wind of the visible red giant makes for easily observed time-variable spectral features in the ultraviolet and in the near infrared spectral line of helium.

At times BD Cam is the brightest S star in the visible sky, because other bright S stars are Mira variables or other types of variable star with large changes in apparent brightness. Its own brightness variability in the visible part of the spectrum is modest.

On the basis of the measurement of radial velocities of the line components it is concluded that the helium emission originates in the vicinity of the inner Lagrangian point of the system, indicating a gas motion from the red giant primary, directed to the secondary, with a velocity of about 5 km/s. At the same time, there is a high-velocity, hot wind outwards from the primary red giant with a velocity of about 50 km/s.

— Shcherbakov, A. G. and Tuominen, I.

However, HR 1105 appears to have a highly variable UV companion. In 1982, no UV flux was discerned for this system, but by 1986 C IV was strong, increasing by a factor of 3 in 1987 with prominent lines of Si III, C III, O III, Si IV, and N V.

— Ake, Thomas B., III; Johnson, Hollis R. and Perry, Benjamin F., Jr.
