= UY Centauri =

Variable star in the constellation Centaurus

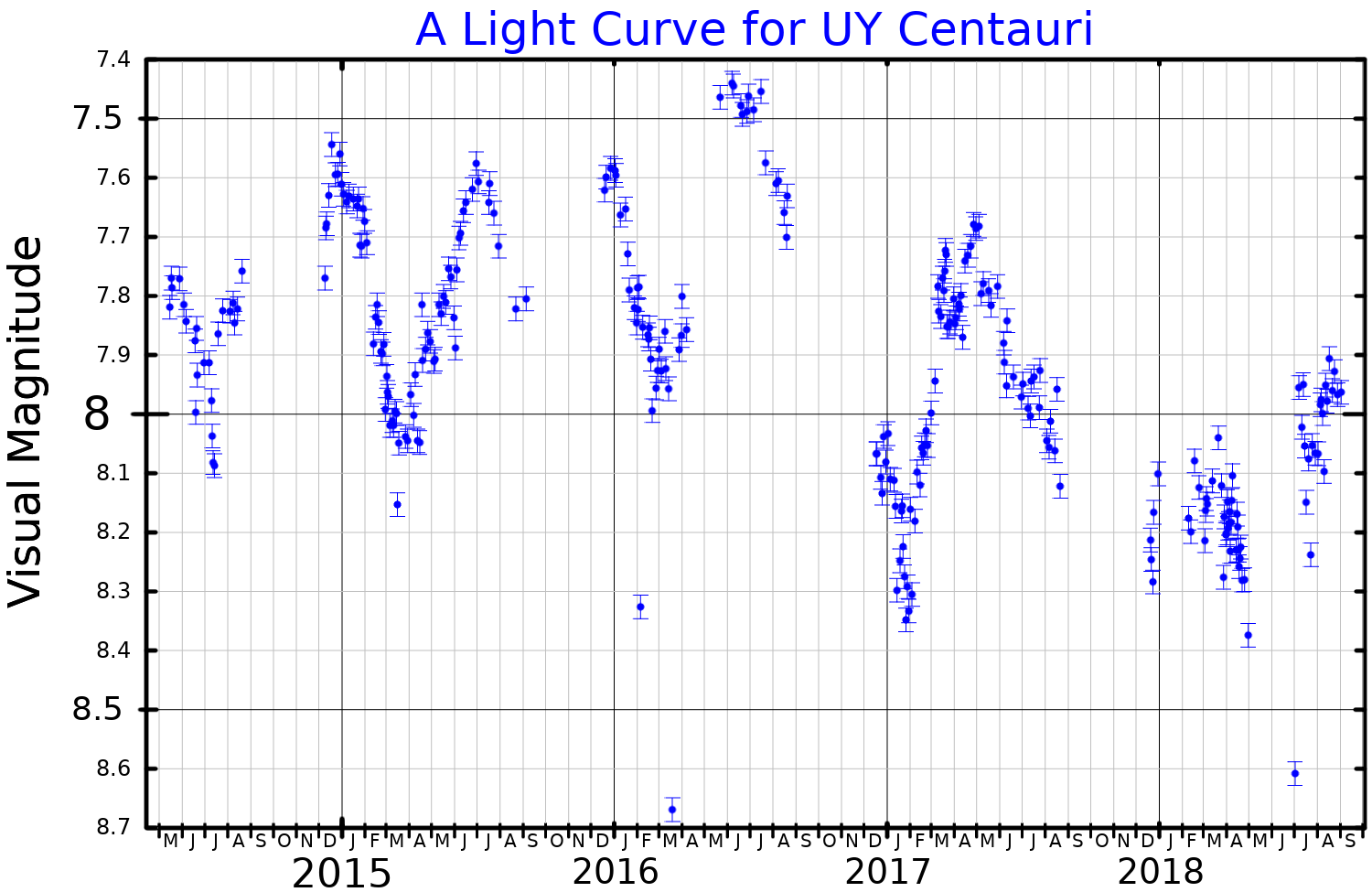
- A visual band light curve for UY Centauri, plotted from ASAS-SN data

Observation data Epoch J2000.0 Equinox ICRS
- Constellation: Centaurus
- Right ascension: 13^{h} 16^{m} 31.830^{s}
- Declination: −44° 42′ 15.76″
- Apparent magnitude (V): 6.93 to 9.48

Characteristics
- Evolutionary stage: Asymptotic giant branch
- Spectral type: S6/8
- U−B color index: 4.06
- B−V color index: 2.90
- Variable type: SRb

Astrometry
Radial velocity (R_{v})	−20.40±1.2 km/s
Proper motion (μ)	RA: −17.492 mas/yr Dec.: 0.351 mas/yr
Parallax (π)	1.5075±0.0529 mas
Distance	2,160 ± 80 ly (660 ± 20 pc)

Details
Mass	1.24±0.02 M_{☉}
Luminosity	11,884^{+1,116}_{−784} L_{☉}
Temperature	3,300^{+100}_{−300} K
Metallicity [Fe/H]	−0.30±0.15 dex
Age	3.5±0.1 Gyr

Other designations
- UY Cen, CD−44° 8539, GC 17957, HD 115236, HIP 64778, SAO 224021, PPM 318310

Database references
SIMBAD	data

UY Centauri is a variable star in the southern constellation of Centaurus. It ranges from an apparent visual magnitude of 6.93 down to 9.48 with a period of 178.4 days, making it too faint to readily view with the naked eye even at peak brightness. The distance to this star is approximately 2,160 light years based on parallax measurements, although it is drifting closer to the Sun with a radial velocity of −20 km/s.

In 1911, it was announced that Williamina Fleming had discovered the variability and peculiar spectrum of this star, then known as DM −44° 8539. It was given its variable star designation, UY Centauri, in 1912. In 1952, S. Gaposchkin listed it as a semiregular variable with a period of 114.6 days and a class of K5p. K. G. Henize included it in a list of candidate S stars below declination −25°, although noting it showed unusual spectral features. In 1971, UY Cen was named the prototype of SC stars, a rare group with spectra that lie between S- and C-type stars.

This is an evolved star on the asymptotic giant branch that is shedding mass at an estimated rate of 1.70×10^{−7} M_{☉}·yr^{−1}. The ratio of carbon to oxygen isotopes in the stellar atmosphere is almost exactly 1. At this stage, it is expected that most of these expelled atoms become locked up in carbon monoxide gas, preventing further dust formation. However, in 2002, this star was observed to undergo a steep decline in luminosity, dropping by two magnitudes. This was interpreted as an episode of circumstellar dust formation. It may be an indication that UY Cen is starting to evolve away from the SC phase.
