= R Andromedae =

Star in the constellation Andromeda

- Location of R Andromedae (circled)

Observation data Epoch J2000 Equinox ICRS
- Constellation: Andromeda
- Right ascension: 00^{h} 24^{m} 01.94575^{s}
- Declination: +38° 34′ 37.3701″
- Apparent magnitude (V): 5.8 - 15.2

Characteristics
- Evolutionary stage: AGB
- Spectral type: S3,5e-S8,8e(M7e)
- B−V color index: 1.97
- Variable type: Mira

Astrometry
| Radial velocity (R_{v}) | −6.40 km/s |
| Proper motion (μ) | RA: −16.021±0.148 mas/yr Dec.: −32.794±0.141 mas/yr |
| Parallax (π) | 2.6444±0.1600 mas |
| Distance | 1,230 ± 70 ly (380 ± 20 pc) |
| Absolute magnitude (M_{V}) | −5.19 |

Details
| Mass | 3.7 M_{☉} |
| Radius | 730 (Note: Applying the Stefan–Boltzmann law with a nominal solar effective temperature of 5,772 K: $$\sqrt{\biggl(\frac{5,772}{1,900}\biggr)^4 \cdot 6,000} = 730\ R_\odot$$.) or 476±120 – 493±129 R_{☉} |
| Luminosity | 6,300 L_{☉} |
| Surface gravity (log g) | −1.02 cgs |
| Temperature | 1,900 – 2,500 K |
| Metallicity [Fe/H] | −1.01 dex |

Other designations
- HR 90, BD +37°58, HD 1967, SAO 53860, HIP 1901.

Database references
| SIMBAD | data |

R Andromedae (R And) is a Mira-type variable star in the constellation Andromeda located about 1,200 light-years away. Its spectral class is type S because it shows absorption bands of zirconium monoxide (ZrO) in its spectrum. It was among the stars found by Paul Merrill to show absorption lines of the unstable element technetium, establishing that nucleosynthesis must be occurring in stars. The SH molecule was found for the first time outside earth in the atmosphere of this star. The star is losing mass due to stellar winds at a rate of 1.09×10^{−6} M_{☉}/yr. R And enters solar conjunction and becomes hidden by the Sun's glare in April. It reaches opposition in mid-October, when it is visible all night.

== Variability ==
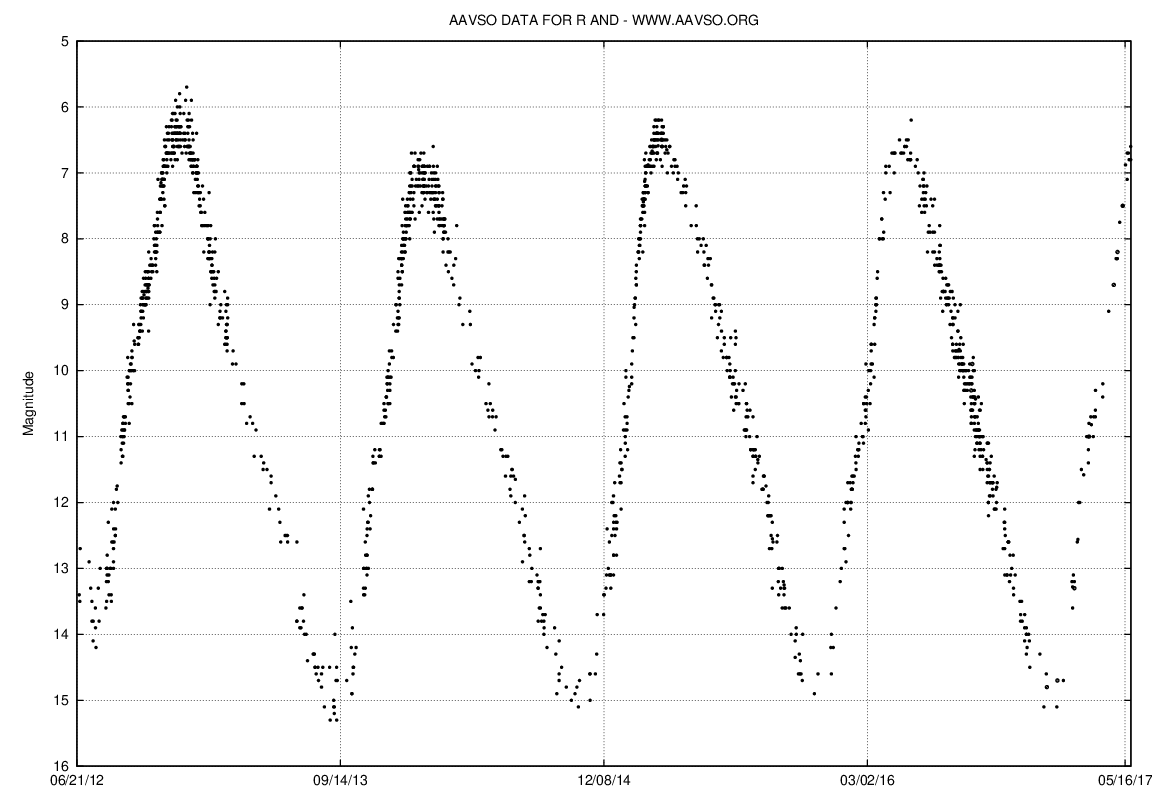
R Andromedae light curve

R Andromedae shows periodic variations in its brightness approximately every 409 days. The maximum brightness is not the same every cycle and can reach a peak magnitude of m_{v} = 5.8, with the lowest known minima nearly 10 magnitudes fainter. The rise to maximum brightness is approximately twice as fast as the fall to minimum brightness. It is classified as a Mira variable. Those stars contract and expand regularly, changing size and temperature, and this causes the brightness variations.

== Properties ==
R Andromedae has a spectral type that varies as its brightness changes. At a typical maximum it is assigned a spectral type of S5/4.5e. This makes it an S-type star, a red giant similar to class M stars but with unusually strong molecular bands of ZrO in its spectrum compared to the titanium oxide (TiO) bands seen in other cool giants. S stars are intermediate between carbon stars and the more typical oxygen-rich giants. The S5 indicates its relative temperature, while the number after the slash is a measure of the relative C:O ratio, 4.5 meaning carbon is about 97% as abundant as oxygen. ZrO bands in R Andromedae are about twenty times stronger than those of TiO. When it is fainter, the spectral type has been classified as late as S8,8e. On this older classification system for S stars, the number after the comma is an indication of the relative strength of ZrO and TiO bands which used to be considered to show the C:O ratio.

R Andromedae, like all Mira variables, is an asymptotic giant branch star, one that has exhausted its core helium and is burning it in a shell outside the core and hydrogen in a shell closer to the surface. These stars undergo dredge-up events which cause convection of fusion products to the surface and anomalies such as enhanced carbon and zirconium. Asymptotic giant branch stars are very cool and luminous red giants; R Andromedae varies in temperature and luminosity but is typically about 2,500 K and 6,300 L_{☉}. The angular diameter of R Andromedae has been measured at 8.63±1.42 mas and 8.32±1.27 mas on different dates, corresponding to radii of 493±129 R_{☉} and 476±120 R_{☉} respectively, assuming a distance of 532 pc. Other measurements based on the spectral energy distribution of the star give a luminosity of 6,000 L_{☉} and a very cool temperature of 1,900 K, which imply a very large radius of 730 R_{☉}. R Andromedae is one of the largest known stars.
