= R Geminorum =

Star in the constellation of Gemini

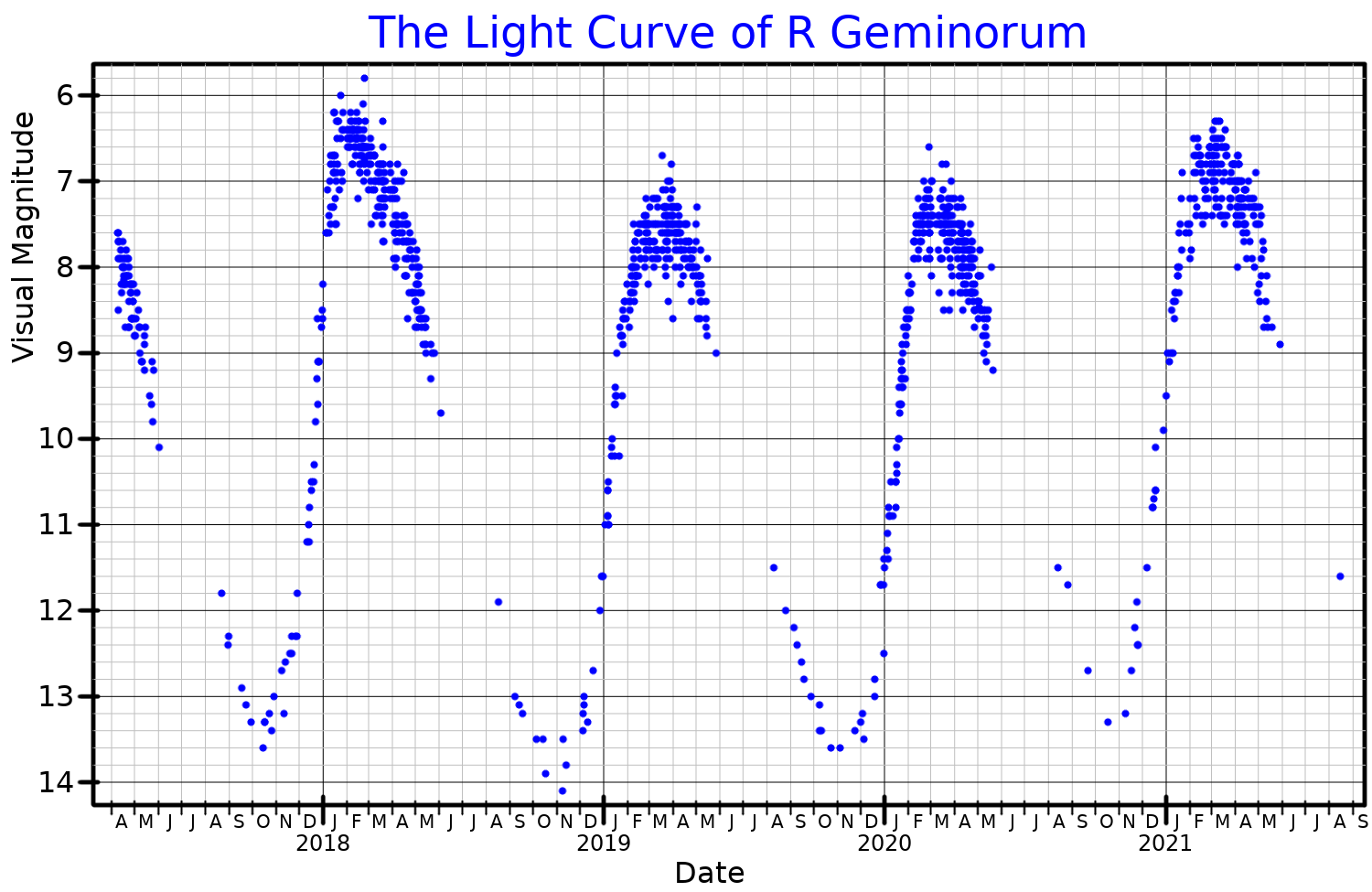
- The visual band light curve of R Geminorum, from AAVSO data

Observation data Epoch J2000 Equinox ICRS
- Constellation: Gemini
- Right ascension: 07^{h} 07^{m} 21.271^{s}
- Declination: +22° 42′ 12.75″
- Apparent magnitude (V): 6.0 - 14.0

Characteristics
- Evolutionary stage: AGB
- Spectral type: S2,9e-S8,9e(Tc)
- Variable type: Mira

Astrometry
Radial velocity (R_{v})	−45.2 km/s
Proper motion (μ)	RA: −8.765 mas/yr Dec.: 0.665 mas/yr
Parallax (π)	1.1795±0.0960 mas
Distance	2,800 ± 200 ly (850 ± 70 pc)

Details
Radius	431 R_{☉}
Luminosity	5,500 L_{☉}
Temperature	2,400 K

Other designations
- BD+22 1577, HD 53791, HIP 34356, HR 2671, SAO 79070

Database references
SIMBAD	data

R Geminorum (R Gem) is a Mira variable and technetium star in the constellation Gemini. It is located approximately 850 parsecs (2,800 ly) away.

R Geminorum pulsates with an average period of 369.9 days, varying by up to eight magnitudes at visual wavelengths. When at maximum light its apparent visual magnitude is usually between 6 and 7, while at minimum light it is typically near magnitude 14.

R Geminorum is one of the brightest known examples of an S-type star, a type that is similar to M-type star, but whose spectra shows zirconium oxide, yttrium oxide and technetium. These exotic elements are formed in the star's core. Technetium has a half-life of just 4.2 million years, so it must have been brought up from the core relatively recently. R Gem has an unusual amount of it, even for an S-type star.
