= W Aquilae =

Variable star in the constellation Aquila

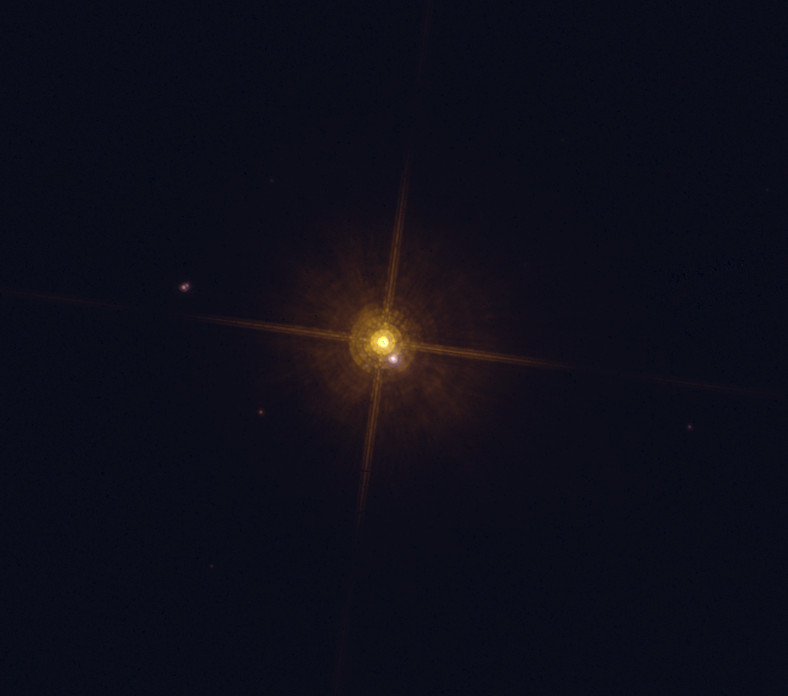
- W Aquilae showing the close companion Credit: Hubble Legacy Archive

Observation data Epoch J2000 Equinox ICRS
- Constellation: Aquila
- Right ascension: 19^{h} 15^{m} 23.357^{s}
- Declination: −07° 02′ 50.33″
- Apparent magnitude (V): A: 7.0 - 14.6; B:14.8

Characteristics

A
- Evolutionary stage: asymptotic giant branch
- Spectral type: S6/6e (S3,9e - S6,9e)
- B−V color index: +2.58
- Variable type: Mira

B
- Evolutionary stage: main sequence
- Spectral type: F8/9

Astrometry
Radial velocity (R_{v})	−18.0 km/s
Proper motion (μ)	RA: 15.713 mas/yr Dec.: 0.103 mas/yr
Parallax (π)	2.6735±0.1392 mas
Distance	1,220 ± 60 ly (370 ± 20 pc)
Absolute magnitude (M_{V})	A: −0.7 to +6.9; B: +7.1

Details

A
Mass	1.04 - 3 M_{☉}
Radius	444 (Note: Radius calculated with angular diameter and distance in Table 1) R_{☉}
Luminosity	7,500 L_{☉}
Temperature	2,800 K

B
Mass	1.04 - 1.09 M_{☉}
Temperature	5,900 - 6,170 K

Other designations
- W Aql, IRAS 19126−0708, TYC 5142-2895-1, 2MASS J19152335−0702503, AAVSO 1910−07, Gaia DR2 420492505899016640

Database references
SIMBAD	data

W Aquilae (W Aql) is a variable star in the constellation of Aquila. It is a type of evolved star known as an S-type star. Due to its relatively close distance of 1,200 light-years (370 pc) and equatorial location, it is easy to observe and heavily studied.

== Description ==
W Aquilae is an S-type star with a spectral type of S3,9e to S6,9e, a red giant similar to M-type stars, but in which the dominant spectrum oxides are formed by metals of the fifth period of the periodic table. W Aquilae is also rich in the element technetium. Another feature of this class of stars is the stellar mass loss, in the case of W Aquilae is estimated at 4×10^{−6} solar masses per year. Its effective temperature is about 2,800 K and its radius is equivalent to 440 solar radii. It is also a very luminous star, 7,500 times more than the sun.

== Variability ==
In 1893, Leo Anton Carl de Ball announced that the then unnamed star was a variable star, whose brightness varied by at least one magnitude. It was listed with its variable star designation, W Aquilae, in Annie Jump Cannon's 1907 Second Catalogue of Variable Stars.

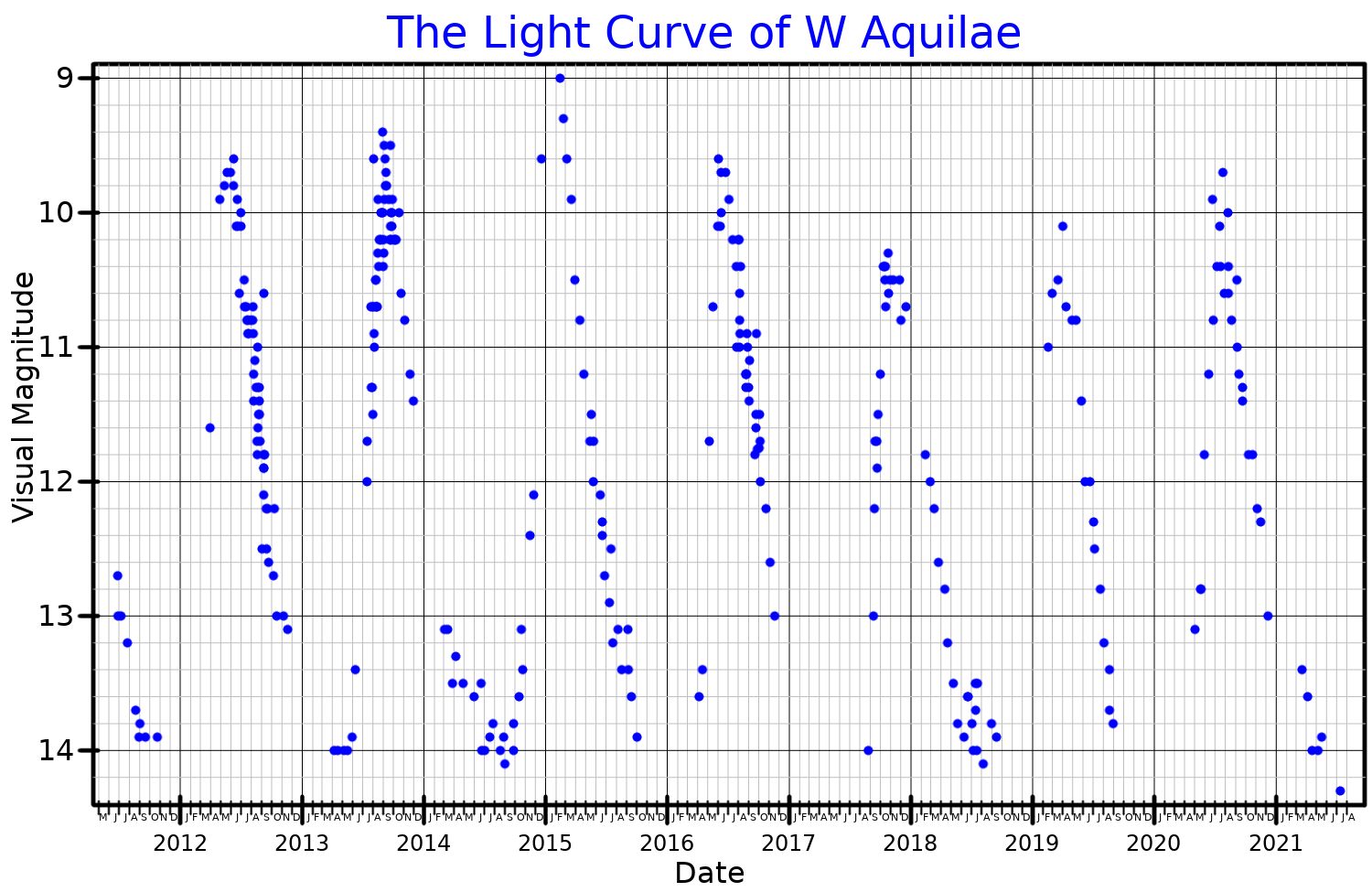
The visual band light curve of W Aquilae, from AAVSO data

W Aquilae is a variable whose brightness oscillates between magnitude +7.3 and +14.3 over a period of 490.43 days. In Mira variables (which are named after Mira, the prototype), this instability comes from pulsation in the stellar surface, causing changes in color and brightness. W Aquilae, a Mira variable, shows silicon monoxide maser emission.

== Companion ==
A magnitude 14.8 companion has been detected 0.47" SW of W Aquilae. This is fainter than W Aquilae at minimum and corresponds to an absolute magnitude of +7.1. Although that absolute magnitude would correspond to a K4 main sequence star, a spectrum was classified as F5 or F8. The separation between the two stars is 160 AU.

== Planet X ==
A 2014 study of W Aquilae and α Centauri with the ALMA array claimed to have accidentally detected a previously-unknown Solar System object. This received widespread press coverage as a potential discovery of planet X. The paper was withdrawn without being accepted for peer-reviewed publication.
