= R Cygni =

Star in the constellation Cygnus

Observation data Epoch J2000 Equinox ICRS
- Constellation: Cygnus
- Right ascension: 19^{h} 36^{m} 49.35633^{s}
- Declination: +50° 11′ 59.7198″
- Apparent magnitude (V): 6.1 - 14.4

Characteristics
- Evolutionary stage: AGB
- Spectral type: S2.5,9e-S6,9e(Tc)
- Variable type: Mira

Astrometry
Proper motion (μ)	RA: −3.158 mas/yr Dec.: −5.755 mas/yr
Parallax (π)	1.4835±0.0963 mas
Distance	2,200 ± 100 ly (670 ± 40 pc)

Details
Mass	0.85 M_{☉}
Luminosity	11,700 L_{☉}
Surface gravity (log g)	−0.50 cgs
Temperature	2,538 K
Metallicity [Fe/H]	+0.50 dex

Other designations
- R Cyg, AAVSO 1934+49, BD+49 3064, HD 185456, HIP 31822, SAO 31822, WDS J19368+5012

Database references
SIMBAD	data

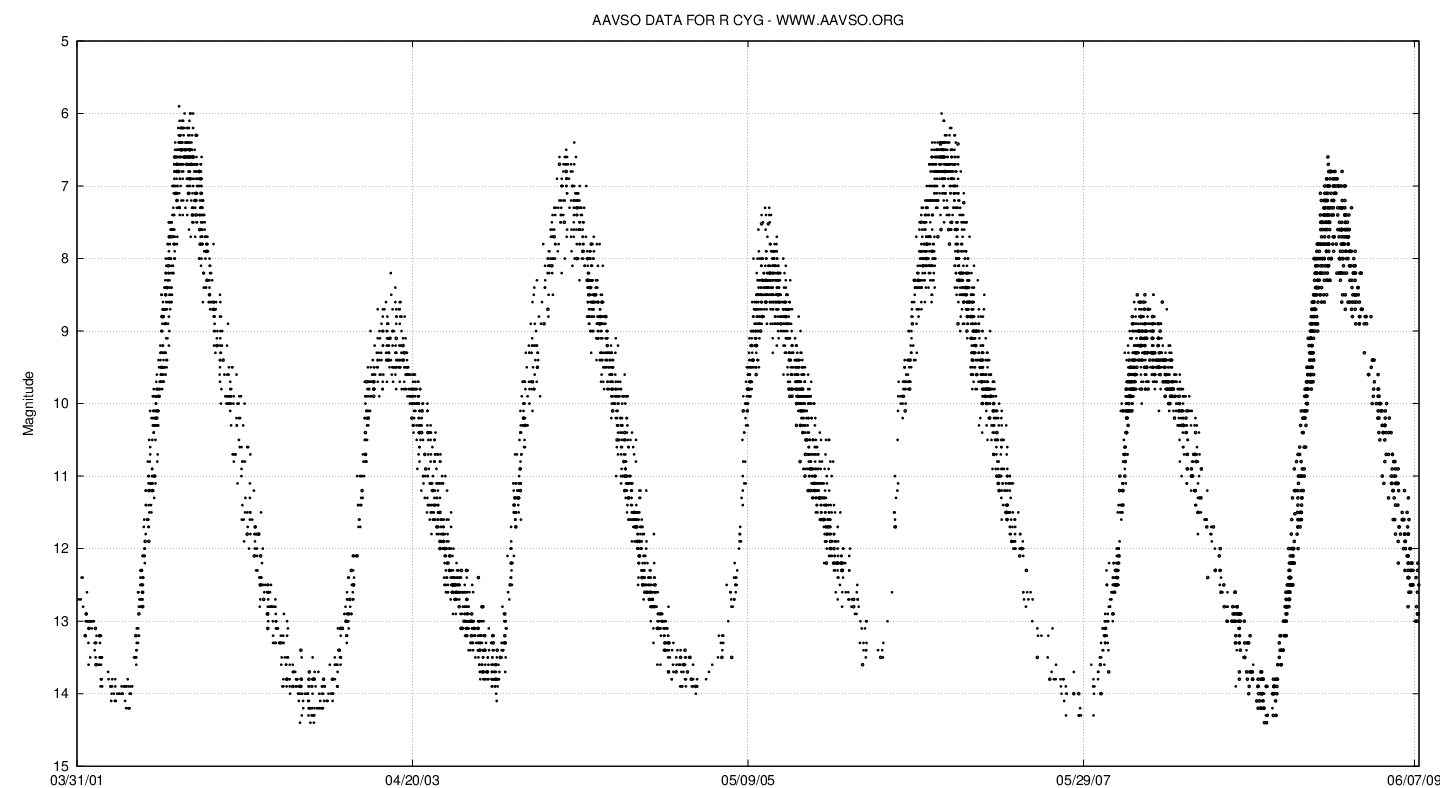
R Cygni light curve, showing the period-doubling

R Cygni is a variable star of the Mira type in the constellation Cygnus, less than 4' from θ Cygni. This is a red giant star on the asymptotic giant branch located around 2,200 light years away. It is an S-type star ranging between spectral types S2.5,9e to S6,9e(Tc).

Stars at this mass range and evolutionary stage are pulsationally unstable, displaying a variation in their light output. R Cygni has a maximum magnitude of 6.1 and a minimum magnitude of 14.4, with a period of 426.45 days. The variation of this star was discovered by English astronomer N. R. Pogson in 1852, and it has a history of recorded brightness measurements stretching back more than a century. R Cygni shows distinct period-doubling, where alternate maxima are of different brightness, hence the real period of pulsation could be considered to be twice that from one maximum to the next.

The Catalog of Components of Double and Multiple Stars lists 10th magnitude BD+49 3065 as a companion to R Cygni, at a separation of 91", and both stars lie at approximately the same distance. The Washington Double Star Catalog additionally lists a 15th magnitude star as a companion at a separation of about 14".

== See also ==
- List of largest known stars
