= 17 Cygni =

Star in the constellation Cygnus

- Location of 17 Cygni (circled in red)

Observation data Epoch J2000 Equinox ICRS
- Constellation: Cygnus
- A
- Right ascension: 19^{h} 46^{m} 25.600^{s}
- Declination: +33° 43′ 39.35″
- Apparent magnitude (V): 5.00
- B
- Right ascension: 19^{h} 46^{m} 27.547^{s}
- Declination: +33° 43′ 48.89″
- Apparent magnitude (V): 8.55

Characteristics
- Spectral type: F7 V + K6 V + K3 V + K3 V
- B−V color index: 0.46

Astrometry

A
Radial velocity (R_{v})	+4.1 km/s
Proper motion (μ)	RA: +22.745 mas/yr Dec.: –448.311 mas/yr
Parallax (π)	47.6516±0.0675 mas
Distance	68.45 ± 0.10 ly (20.99 ± 0.03 pc)
Absolute magnitude (M_{V})	+3.34

B
Radial velocity (R_{v})	+3.7 km/s
Proper motion (μ)	RA: +21.547 mas/yr Dec.: –438.730 mas/yr
Parallax (π)	47.7379±0.0185 mas
Distance	68.32 ± 0.03 ly (20.948 ± 0.008 pc)
Absolute magnitude (M_{V})	+6.91

Details

A
Mass	1.24 M_{☉}
Radius	1.538 R_{☉}
Luminosity	3.66 L_{☉}
Surface gravity (log g)	4.262 cgs
Temperature	6,455 K
Metallicity [Fe/H]	0.027 dex
Rotational velocity (v sin i)	9 km/s
Age	2.8 Gyr

B
Mass	0.78 M_{☉}
Radius	0.70 R_{☉}
Luminosity	0.21 L_{☉}
Surface gravity (log g)	4.62 cgs
Temperature	4,652 K

F
Mass	0.77 M_{☉}
Radius	0.71 R_{☉}
Luminosity	0.24 L_{☉}
Surface gravity (log g)	4.62 cgs
Temperature	4,789 K
Rotational velocity (v sin i)	3.6 km/s

G
Mass	0.75 M_{☉}
Radius	0.71 R_{☉}
Luminosity	0.22 L_{☉}
Surface gravity (log g)	4.61 cgs
Temperature	4,686 K
Rotational velocity (v sin i)	3.0 km/s

Other designations
- 17 Cyg, BD+33°3587, GJ 767.1, GJ 9670, HD 187013, HIP 97295, HR 7534, SAO 68827

Database references
SIMBAD	data
- B
- F
- G

17 Cygni is the Flamsteed designation for a multiple star system in the northern constellation of Cygnus. It has an apparent visual magnitude of 5.00, so, according to the Bortle scale, it is visible from suburban skies at night. Measurements of the annual parallax find a shift of 0.0477″, which is equivalent to a distance of around 68.5 ly (21.0 pc) from the Sun. It has a relatively high proper motion, traversing the celestial sphere at the rate of 0.451″/year.

This system consists of two visual binary systems that were discovered by John Herschel in the 1820s. Components A and B form a bright, wide pair with an angular separation of 26.0 arcsecond and an estimated orbital period of ~6,200 years. The faint, close system consists of components F and G with a separation of 2.6 arcsecond and a period of 238 years. The two binaries form a hierarchical system with a separation of about 800 arcseconds and orbital period of 3.7 million years or more. Although the CCDM lists four other companions, these are not associated with the system.

The stellar classification of the primary star, component A, is F7 V, which means it is a main sequence star like the Sun. The star has 1.24 times the mass of the Sun and 1.54 times the Sun's radius. It is some 2.8 billion years old and shines with 3.66 times the Sun's luminosity. The effective temperature of the stellar atmosphere is 6,455 K, giving it the yellow-white hued glow of an F-type star.
