= S-type star =

Type of cool giant star

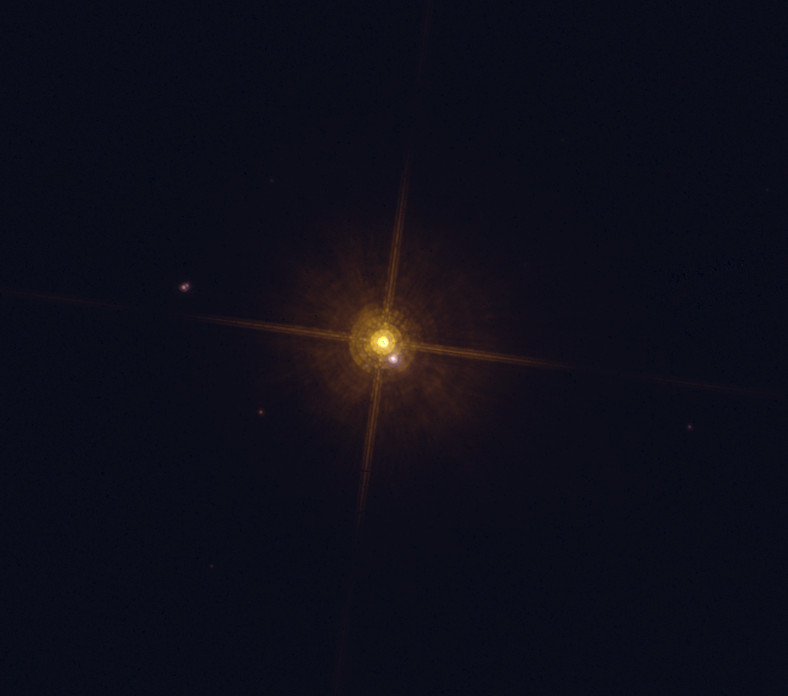
W Aquilae is an S-type star and Mira variable with a close companion resolved by the Hubble Space Telescope.

An S-type star (or just S star) is a cool giant star with approximately equal quantities of carbon and oxygen in its atmosphere. The class was originally defined in 1922 by Paul Merrill for stars with unusual absorption lines and molecular bands now known to be due to s-process elements. The bands of zirconium monoxide (ZrO) are a defining feature of the S stars.

The carbon stars have more carbon than oxygen in their atmospheres. In most stars, such as class M giants, the atmosphere is richer in oxygen than carbon and they are referred to as oxygen-rich stars. S-type stars are intermediate between carbon stars and normal giants. They can be grouped into two classes: intrinsic S stars, which owe their spectra to convection of fusion products and s-process elements to the surface; and extrinsic S stars, which are formed through mass transfer in a binary system.

The intrinsic S-type stars are on the most luminous portion of the asymptotic giant branch, a stage of their lives lasting less than a million years. Many are long period variable stars. The extrinsic S stars are less luminous and longer-lived, often smaller-amplitude semiregular or irregular variables. S stars are relatively rare, with intrinsic S stars forming less than 10% of asymptotic giant branch stars of comparable luminosity, while extrinsic S stars form an even smaller proportion of all red giants.

== Spectral features ==
Cool stars, particularly class M, show molecular bands, with titanium(II) oxide (TiO) especially strong. A small proportion of these cool stars also show correspondingly strong bands of zirconium oxide (ZrO). The existence of clearly detectable ZrO bands in visual spectra is the definition of an S-type star.

The main ZrO series are:

- α series, in the blue at 464.06 nm, 462.61 nm, and 461.98 nm
- β series, in the yellow at 555.17 nm and 571.81 nm
- γ series, in the red at 647.4 nm, 634.5 nm, and 622.9 nm

The original definition of an S star was that the ZrO bands should be easily detectable on low dispersion photographic spectral plates, but more modern spectra allow identification of many stars with much weaker ZrO. MS stars, intermediate with normal class M stars, have barely detectable ZrO but otherwise normal class M spectra. SC stars, intermediate with carbon stars, have weak or undetectable ZrO, but strong sodium D lines and detectable but weak C_{2} bands.

S star spectra also show other differences to those of normal M class giants. The characteristic TiO bands of cool giants are weakened in most S stars, compared to M stars of similar temperature, and completely absent in some. Features related to s-process isotopes such as YO bands, Sri lines, Baii lines, and LaO bands, and also sodium D lines are all much stronger. However, VO bands are absent or very weak. The existence of spectral lines from the period 5 element technetium (Tc) is also expected as a result of the s-process neutron capture, but a substantial fraction of S stars show no sign of Tc. Stars with strong Tc lines are sometimes referred to as technetium stars, and they can be of class M, S, C, or the intermediate MS and SC.

Some S stars, especially Mira variables, show strong hydrogen emission lines. The H_{β} emission is often unusually strong compared to other lines of the Balmer series in a normal M star, but this is due to the weakness of the TiO band that would otherwise dilute the H_{β} emission.

== Classification schemes ==
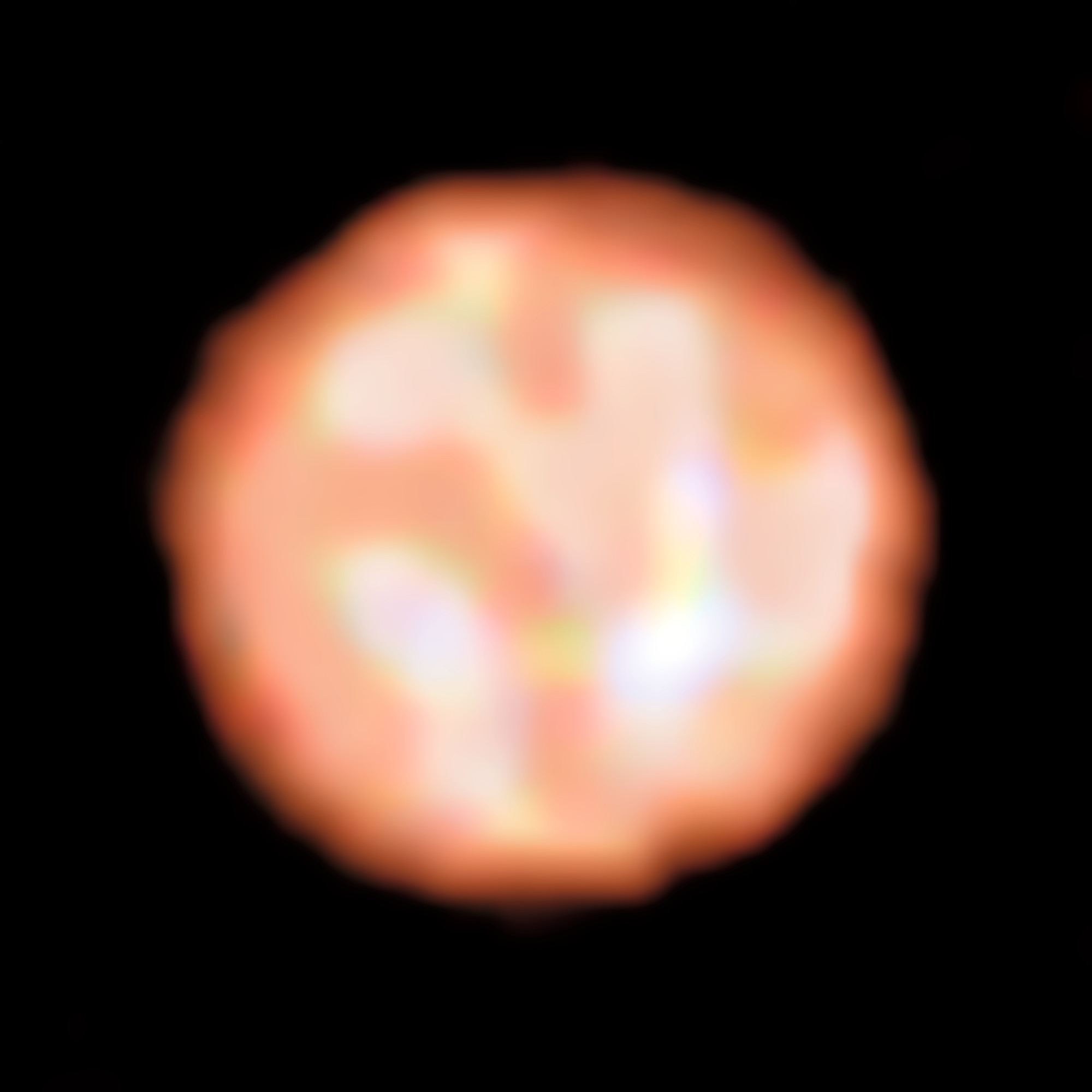
The surface of the red giant star π^{1} Gruis from PIONIER on the VLT

The spectral class S was first defined in 1922 to represent a number of long-period variables (meaning Mira variables) and stars with similar peculiar spectra. Many of the absorption lines in the spectra were recognised as unusual, but their associated elements were not known. The absorption bands now recognised as due to ZrO are clearly listed as major features of the S-type spectra. At that time, class M was not divided into numeric sub-classes, but into Ma, Mb, Mc, and Md. The new class S was simply left as either S or Se depending on the existence of emission lines. It was considered that the Se stars were all LPVs and the S stars were non-variable, but exceptions have since been found. For example, π^{1} Gruis is now known to be a semiregular variable.

The classification of S stars has been revised several times since its first introduction, to reflect advances in the resolution of available spectra, the discovery of greater numbers of S-type stars, and better understanding of the relationships between the various cool luminous giant spectral types.

=== Comma notation ===
The formalisation of S star classification in 1954 introduced a two-dimensional scheme of the form SX,Y. For example, R Andromedae is listed as S6,6e.

X is the temperature class. It is a digit between 1 (although the smallest type actually listed is S1.5) and 9, intended to represent a temperature scale corresponding approximately to the sequence of M1 to M9. The temperature class is actually calculated by estimating intensities for the ZrO and TiO bands, then summing the larger intensity with half the smaller intensity.

Y is the abundance class. It is also a digit between 1 and 9, assigned by multiplying the ratio of ZrO and TiO bands by the temperature class. This calculation generally yields a number which can be rounded down to give the abundance class digit, but this is modified for higher values:

- 6.0 – 7.5 maps to 6
- 7.6 – 9.9 maps to 7
- 10.0 – 50 maps to 8
- > 50 maps to 9

In practice, spectral types for new stars would be assigned by referencing to the standard stars, since the intensity values are subjective and would be impossible to reproduce from spectra taken under different conditions.

A number of drawbacks came to light as S stars were studied more closely and the mechanisms behind the spectra came to be understood. The strengths of the ZrO and TiO are influenced both by temperature and by actual abundances. The S stars represent a continuum from having oxygen slightly more abundant than carbon to carbon being slightly more abundant than oxygen. When carbon becomes more abundant than oxygen, the free oxygen is rapidly bound into CO and abundances of ZrO and TiO drop dramatically, making them a poor indicator in some stars. The abundance class also becomes unusable for stars with more carbon than oxygen in their atmospheres.

This form of spectral type is a common type seen for S stars, possibly still the most common form.

=== Elemental intensities ===
The first major revision of the classification for S stars completely abandons the single-digit abundance class in favour of explicit abundance intensities for Zr and Ti. So R And is listed, at a normal maximum, with a spectral type of S5e Zr5 Ti2.

In 1979 Ake defined an abundance index based on the ZrO, TiO, and YO band intensities. This single digit between 1 and 7 was intended to represent the transition from MS stars through increasing C/O ratios to SC stars. Spectral types were still listed with explicit Zr and Ti intensity values, and the abundance index was included separately in the list of standard stars.

Abundance index criteria and estimated C/O ratio
Abundance index	Criteria	C/O ratio
1	TiO ≫ ZrO and YO	< 0 / .90
2	TiO ≥ ZrO ≥ 2×YO	0 / .90
3	2×YO ≥ ZrO ≥ TiO	0 / .93
4	ZrO ≥ 2×YO > TiO	0 / .95
5	ZrO ≥ 2×YO, TiO = 0	> 0 / .95
6	ZrO weak, YO and TiO = 0	~ 1
7	CS and carbon stars	> 1

=== Slash notation ===
The abundance index was immediately adopted and extended to run from 1 to 10, differentiating abundances in SC stars. It was now quoted as part of the spectral type in preference to separate Zr and Ti abundances. To distinguish it from the earlier abandoned abundance class it was used with a slash character after the temperature class, so that the spectral class for R And became S5/4.5e.

The new abundance index is not calculated directly, but is assigned from the relative strengths of a number of spectral features. It is designed to closely indicate the sequence of C/O ratios from below 0.95 to about 1.1. Primarily the relative strength of ZrO and TiO bands forms a sequence from MS stars to abundance index 1 through 6. Abundance indices 7 to 10 are the SC stars and ZrO is weak or absent so the relative strength of the sodium D lines and C_{s} bands is used. Abundance index 0 is not used, and abundance index 10 is equivalent to a carbon star Cx,2 so it is also never seen.

Abundance index criteria and estimated C/O ratio
Abundance index	Criteria	C/O ratio
MS	Strongest YO and ZrO bands just visible	
1	TiO ≫ ZrO and YO	< 0 / .95
2	TiO > ZrO	0 / .95:
3	ZrO = TiO, YO strong	0 / .96
4	ZrO > TiO	0 / .97
5	ZrO ≫ TiO	0 / .97
6	ZrO strong, TiO = 0	0 / .98
7 (SC)	ZrO weaker, D lines strong	0 / .99
8 (SC)	No ZrO or C_{2}, D lines very strong	1 / .00
9 (SC)	C_{2} very weak, D lines very strong	1 / .02
10 (SC)	C_{2} weak, D lines strong	1 / .1:

The derivation of the temperature class is also refined, to use line ratios in addition to the total ZrO and TiO strength. For MS stars and those with abundance index 1 or 2, the same TiO band strength criteria as for M stars can be applied. Ratios of different ZrO bands at 530.5 nm and 555.1 nm are useful with abundance indices 3 and 4, and the sudden appearance of LaO bands at cooler temperatures. The ratio of Baii and Sri lines is also useful at the same indices and for carbon-rich stars with abundance index 7 to 9. Where ZrO and TiO are weak or absent the ratio of the blended features at 645.6 nm and 645.0 nm can be used to assign the temperature class.

=== Asterisk notation ===
With the different classification schemes and the difficulties of assigning a consistent class across the whole range of MS, S, and SC stars, other schemes are sometimes used. For example, one survey of new S/MS, carbon, and SC stars uses a two-dimensional scheme indicated by an asterisk, for example S5*3. The first digit is based on TiO strength to approximate the class M sequence, and the second is based solely on ZrO strength.

=== Standard stars ===
This table shows the spectral types of a number of well-known S stars as they were classified at various times. Most of the stars are variable, usually of the Mira type. Where possible the table shows the type at maximum brightness, but several of the Ake types in particular are not at maximum brightness and so have a later type. ZrO and TiO band intensities are also shown if they are published (an x indicates that no bands were found). If the abundances are part of the formal spectral type then the abundance index is shown.

Comparison of spectral types under different classification schemes
Star	Keenan (1954)		Keenan et al. (1974)	Ake (1979)		Keenan-Boeshaar (1980)	
R Andromedae	S6,6e:	Zr4 Ti3	S4,6e	S8e Zr6	4	S5/4.5e	Zr5 Ti2
X Andromedae	S3,9e	Zr3 Ti0	S2,9e:	S5.5e Zr4	5	S5/4.5e	Zr2.5 Tix
RR Andromedae	S7,2e:	Zr2 Ti6.5	S6,2e:	S6.5e Zr3 Ti6	2	S6/3.5e	Zr4+ Ti4
W Aquilae	S4,9:	Zr4 Ti0	S3,9e:			S6/6e	Zr6 Ti0
BD Camelopardalis	S5,3	Zr2.5 Ti4		S3.5 Zr2.5 Ti3	2	S3.5/2	Zr2+ Ti3
BH Crucis			SC8,6:			SC4.5/8-e	Zr0 Tix Na10:
Chi Cygni	S7,1e:	Zr0-2 Ti7	S7,2e	S9.5 Zr3 Ti9	1	S6+/1e = Ms6+	Zr2 Ti6
R Cygni	S3.5,9e:	Zr3.5 Ti0	S3,9e	S8e Zr7 Ti3:	4	S5/6e	Zr4 Tix
R Geminorum	S3,9e:	Zr3 Ti0	S3,9e	S8e Zr5	5	S4/6e	Zr3.5 Tix

== Formation ==
There are two distinct classes of S-type stars: intrinsic S stars; and extrinsic S stars. The presence of technetium is used to distinguish the two classes, only being found in the intrinsic S-type stars.

=== Intrinsic S stars ===
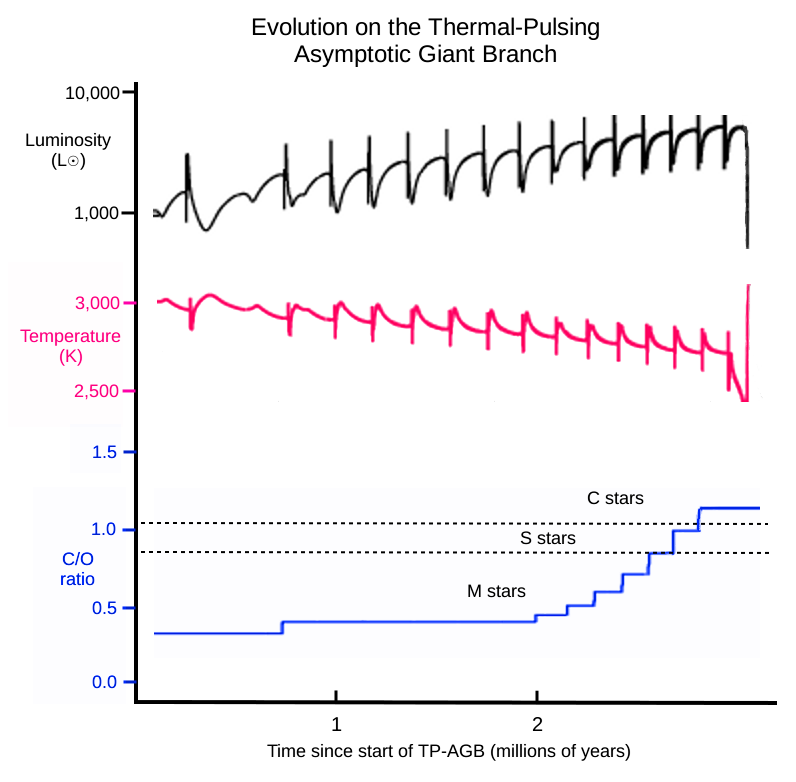
Stellar properties as a 2 M_{☉} solar-metallicity red giant evolves along the TP-AGB to become an S star and then a carbon star

Intrinsic S-type stars are thermal pulsing asymptotic giant branch (TP-AGB) stars. AGB stars have inert carbon-oxygen cores and undergo fusion both in an inner helium shell and an outer hydrogen shell. They are large cool M class giants. The thermal pulses, created by flashes from the helium shell, cause strong convection within the upper layers of the star. These pulses become stronger as the star evolves and in sufficiently massive stars the convection becomes deep enough to dredge up fusion products from the region between the two shells to the surface. These fusion products include carbon and s-process elements. The s-process elements include zirconium (Zr), yttrium (Y), lanthanum (La), technetium (Tc), barium (Ba), and strontium (Sr), which form the characteristic S class spectrum with ZrO, YO, and LaO bands, as well as Tc Sr, and Ba lines. The atmosphere of S stars has a carbon to oxygen ratio in the range 0.5 to < 1. Carbon enrichment continues with subsequent thermal pulses until the carbon abundance exceeds the oxygen abundance, at which point the oxygen in the atmosphere is rapidly locked into CO and formation of the oxides diminishes. These stars show intermediate SC spectra and further carbon enrichment leads to a carbon star.

=== Extrinsic S stars ===
The technetium isotope produced by neutron capture in the s-process is ^{99}Tc and it has a half-life of around 200,000 years in a stellar atmosphere. Any of the isotope present when a star formed would have completely decayed by the time it became a giant, and any newly formed ^{99}Tc dredged up in an AGB star would survive until the end of the AGB phase, making it difficult for a red giant to have other s-process elements in its atmosphere without technetium. S-type stars without technetium form by the transfer of technetium-rich matter, as well as other dredged-up elements, from an intrinsic S star in a binary system onto a smaller less-evolved companion. After a few hundred thousand years, the ^{99}Tc will have decayed and a technetium-free star enriched with carbon and other s-process elements will remain. When this star is, or becomes, a G or K type red giant, it will be classified as a barium star. When it evolves to temperatures cool enough for ZrO absorption bands to show in the spectrum, approximately M class, it will be classified as an S-type star. These stars are called extrinsic S stars.

== Distribution and numbers ==
Stars with a spectral class of S only form under a narrow range of conditions and they are uncommon. The distributions and properties of intrinsic and extrinsic S stars are different, reflecting their different modes of formation.

TP-AGB stars are difficult to identify reliably in large surveys, but counts of normal M-class luminous AGB stars and similar S-type and carbon stars have shown different distributions in the galaxy. S stars are distributed in a similar way to carbon stars, but there are only around a third as many as the carbon stars. Both types of carbon-rich star are very rare near to the Galactic Center, but make up 10% – 20% of all the luminous AGB stars in the solar neighbourhood, so that S stars are around 5% of the AGB stars. The carbon-rich stars are also concentrated more closely in the galactic plane. S-type stars make up a disproportionate number of Mira variables, 7% in one survey compared to 3% of all AGB stars.

Extrinsic S stars are not on the TP-AGB, but are red giant branch stars or early AGB stars. Their numbers and distribution are uncertain. They have been estimated to make up between 30% and 70% of all S-type stars, although only a tiny fraction of all red giant branch stars. They are less strongly concentrated in the galactic disc, indicating that they are from an older population of stars than the intrinsic group.

== Properties ==
Very few intrinsic S stars have had their mass directly measured using a binary orbit, although their masses have been estimated using Mira period-mass relations or pulsations properties. The observed masses were found to be around 1.5 – 5 M_{☉} until very recently when Gaia parallaxes helped discover intrinsic S stars with solar-like masses and metallicities. Models of TP-AGB evolution show that the third dredge-up becomes larger as the shells move towards the surface, and that less massive stars experience fewer dredge-ups before leaving the AGB. Stars with masses of 1.5 – 2.0 M_{☉} will experience enough dredge-ups to become carbon stars, but they will be large events and the star will usually skip straight past the crucial C/O ratio near 1 without becoming an S-type star. More massive stars reach equal levels of carbon and oxygen gradually during several small dredge-ups. Stars more than about 4 M_{☉} experience hot bottom burning (the burning of carbon at the base of the convective envelope) which prevents them becoming carbon stars, but they may still become S-type stars before reverting to an oxygen-rich state. Extrinsic S stars are always in binary systems and their calculated masses are around 1.6 – 2.0 M_{☉}. This is consistent with RGB stars or early AGB stars.

Intrinsic S stars have luminosities around 5,000 – 10,000 L_{☉}, although they are usually variable. Their temperatures average about 2,300 K for the Mira S stars and 3,100 K for the non-Mira S stars, a few hundred K warmer than oxygen-rich AGB stars and a few hundred K cooler than carbon stars. Their radii average about 526 R_{☉} for the Miras and 270 R_{☉} for the non-miras, larger than oxygen-rich stars and smaller than carbon stars. Extrinsic S stars have luminosities typically around 2,000 L_{☉}, temperatures between 3,150 and 4,000 K, and radii less than 150 R_{☉}. This means they lie below the red giant tip and will typically be RGB stars rather than AGB stars.

== Mass loss and dust ==
Extrinsic S stars lose considerable mass through their stellar winds, similar to oxygen-rich TP-AGB stars and carbon stars. Typically the rates are around 1/10,000,000th the mass of the sun per year, although in extreme cases such as W Aquilae they can be more than ten times higher.

It is expected that the existence of dust drives the mass loss in cool stars, but it is unclear what type of dust can form in the atmosphere of an S star with most carbon and oxygen locked into CO gas. The stellar winds of S stars are comparable to oxygen-rich and carbon-rich stars with similar physical properties. There is about 300 times more gas than dust observed in the circumstellar material around S stars. It is believed to be made up of metallic iron, FeSi, silicon carbide, and forsterite. Without silicates and carbon, it is believed that nucleation is triggered by TiC, ZrC, and TiO_{2}.

Detached dust shells are seen around a number of carbon stars, but not S-type stars. Infrared excesses indicate that there is dust around most intrinsic S stars, but the outflow has not been sufficient and longlasting enough to form a visible detached shell. The shells are thought to form during a superwind phase very late in the AGB evolution.

== Examples ==
BD Camelopardalis is a naked-eye example of an extrinsic S star. It is a slow irregular variable in a symbiotic binary system with a hotter companion which may also be variable.

The Mira variable Chi Cygni is an intrinsic S star. When near maximum light, it is the sky's brightest S-type star. It has a variable late type spectrum about S6 to S10, with features of zirconium, titanium and vanadium oxides, sometimes bordering on the intermediate MS type. A number of other prominent Mira variables such as R Andromedae and R Cygni are also S-type stars, as well as the peculiar semiregular variable π^{1} Gruis.

The naked-eye star ο^{1} Ori is an intermediate MS star and small amplitude semiregular variable with a DA3 white dwarf companion. The spectral type has been given as S3.5/1-, M3III(BaII), or M3.2IIIaS.
