= Paul W. Merrill =

American astronomer

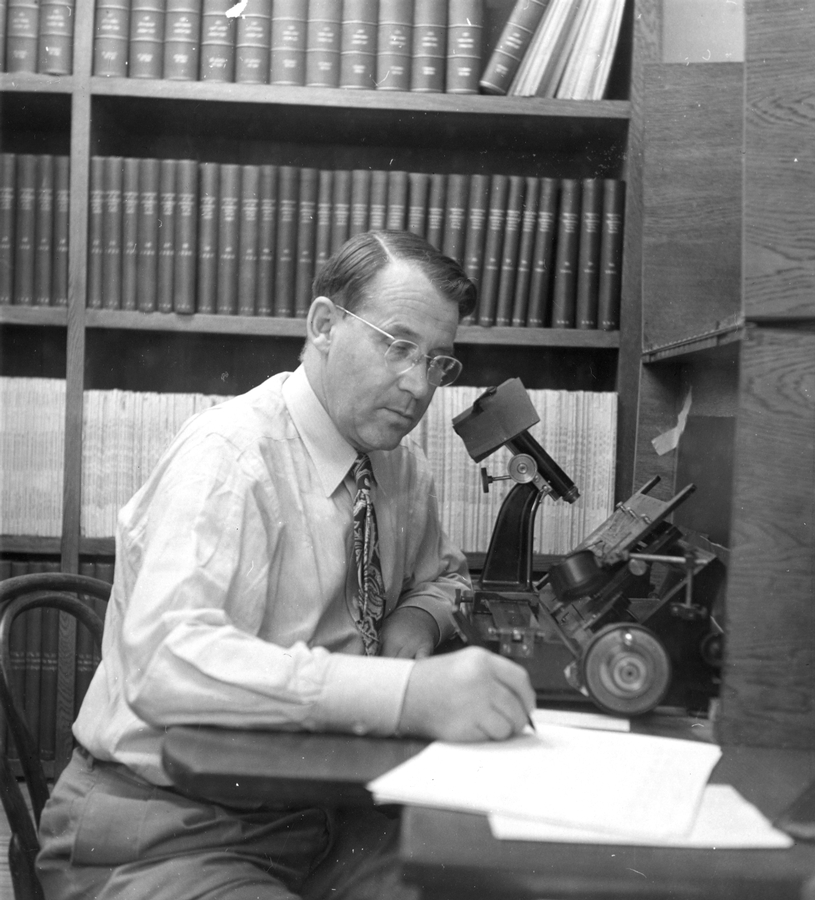
- Born: Paul Willard Merrill; August 15, 1887
- Died: July 19, 1961 (aged 73)
- Occupation: astronomer
- Years active: 1913–1952
- Known for: Studying unusual stars, particularly long-period variable stars, using spectroscopy

Paul Willard Merrill (August 15, 1887 – July 19, 1961) was an American astronomer whose specialty was spectroscopy. He was the first person to define S-type stars, in 1922.

== Career ==
Merrill received his Ph.D. at University of California, Berkeley in 1913. He spent the bulk of his career at Mount Wilson Observatory, from which he retired in 1952. He studied unusual stars, particularly long-period variable stars, using spectroscopy. He also studied the interstellar medium, including diffuse interstellar bands. Shortly before he retired, he succeeded in detecting technetium in the variable star R Andromedae and other red variables. Since technetium has no stable isotopes, it must have been produced recently in any star in which it is found, and this is direct evidence of the s-process of nucleosynthesis.

== Honors ==
Awards and honors

- Member of the United States National Academy of Sciences (1929)
- Member of the American Philosophical Society (1939)
- Henry Draper Medal of the National Academy of Sciences (1945)
- Bruce Medal of the Astronomical Society of the Pacific (1946)
- Henry Norris Russell Lectureship of the American Astronomical Society (1955)
- Fellow of the American Academy of Arts and Sciences (1958)

Named after him

- Merrill (crater) on the Moon
