= S-process =

Nucleosynthesis pathway

The slow neutron-capture process, or s-process, is a series of reactions in nuclear astrophysics that occur in stars, particularly asymptotic giant branch stars. The s-process is responsible for the creation (nucleosynthesis) of approximately half the atomic nuclei heavier than iron.

In the s-process, a seed nucleus undergoes neutron capture to form an isotope with one higher atomic mass. If the new isotope is stable, a series of increases in mass can occur, but if it is unstable, then beta decay will occur, producing an element of the next higher atomic number. The process is slow (hence the name) in the sense that there is sufficient time for this radioactive decay to occur before another neutron is captured. A series of these reactions produces stable isotopes by moving along the valley of beta-decay stable isobars in the table of nuclides.

A range of elements and isotopes can be produced by the s-process, because of the intervention of alpha decay steps along the reaction chain. The relative abundances of elements and isotopes produced depends on the source of the neutrons and how their flux changes over time. Each branch of the s-process reaction chain eventually terminates at a cycle involving lead, bismuth, and polonium.

The s-process contrasts with the r-process, in which successive neutron captures are rapid: they happen more quickly than the beta decay can occur. The r-process dominates in environments with higher fluxes of free neutrons; it produces heavier elements and more neutron-rich isotopes than the s-process. Together the two processes account for most of the relative abundance of chemical elements heavier than iron.

== History ==
The s-process was seen to be needed from the relative abundances of isotopes of heavy elements and from a newly published table of abundances by Hans Suess and Harold Urey in 1956. Among other things, these data showed abundance peaks for strontium, barium, and lead, which, according to quantum mechanics and the nuclear shell model, are particularly stable nuclei, much like the noble gases are chemically inert. This implied that some abundant nuclei must be created by slow neutron capture, and it was only a matter of determining how other nuclei could be accounted for by such a process. A table apportioning the heavy isotopes between s-process and r-process was published in the famous B^{2}FH review paper in 1957. There it was also argued that the s-process occurs in red giant stars. In a striking confirmation, the element technetium, with no isotope having a half-life longer than 4.2 million years, had been discovered in S-type and carbon stars in 1952 by Paul W. Merrill. Since these stars were thought to be billions of years old, the presence of technetium in their outer atmospheres was evidence of its recent creation, with no necessary connection to the nuclear fusion in the deep interior of the star that provides its power.

Periodic table showing the cosmogenic origin of each element. The elements heavier than iron with origins in dying low-mass stars are typically those produced by the s-process, which is characterized by slow neutron diffusion and capture over long periods in such stars.

A calculable model for creating the heavy isotopes from iron seed nuclei in a time-dependent manner was not provided until 1961. That work showed that the large overabundances of barium observed by astronomers in certain red-giant stars could be created from iron seed nuclei if the total neutron flux (number of neutrons per unit area) was appropriate. It also showed that no one single value for neutron flux could account for the observed s-process abundances, but that a wide range is required. The numbers of iron seed nuclei that were exposed to a given flux must decrease as the flux becomes stronger. This work also showed that the curve of the product of neutron-capture cross section times abundance is not a smoothly falling curve, as B^{2}FH had sketched, but rather has a ledge-precipice structure. A series of papers in the 1970s by Donald D. Clayton utilizing an exponentially declining neutron flux as a function of the number of iron nuclei exposed became the standard model of the s-process and remained so until the details of AGB-star nucleosynthesis became sufficiently advanced that they became a standard model for s-process element formation based on stellar structure models. Important series of measurements of neutron-capture cross sections were reported from Oak Ridge National Lab in 1965 and by Karlsruhe Institute of Technology's Nuclear Physics Center in 1982 and subsequently, these placed the s-process on the firm quantitative basis that it enjoys today.

== In stars ==
The s-process is believed to occur mostly in asymptotic giant branch stars, seeded by iron nuclei left by a supernova during a previous generation of stars. In contrast to the r-process which is believed to occur over time scales of seconds in explosive environments, the s-process is believed to occur over time scales of thousands of years, passing decades between neutron captures. The extent to which the s-process moves up the elements in the chart of isotopes to higher mass numbers is essentially determined by the degree to which the star in question is able to produce neutrons. The quantitative yield is also proportional to the amount of iron in the star's initial abundance distribution. Iron is the "starting material" (or seed) for this neutron capture-beta minus decay sequence of synthesizing new elements.

The main neutron source reactions are:

^{13}_{6}C	+	^{4}_{2}He	→	^{16}_{8}O	+	n
^{22}_{10}Ne	+	^{4}_{2}He	→	^{25}_{12}Mg	+	n

The s-process acting in the range from Ag to Sb

One distinguishes the main and the weak s-process component. The main component produces heavy elements beyond Sr and Y, and up to Pb in the lowest metallicity stars. The production sites of the main component are low-mass asymptotic giant branch stars. The main component relies on the ^{13}C neutron source above. The weak component of the s-process, on the other hand, synthesizes s-process isotopes of elements from iron group seed nuclei to ^{58}Fe on up to Sr and Y, and takes place at the end of helium- and carbon-burning in massive stars. It employs primarily the ^{22}Ne neutron source. These stars will become supernovae at their demise and spew those s-process isotopes into interstellar gas.

The s-process is sometimes approximated over a small mass region using the so-called "local approximation", by which the ratio of abundances is inversely proportional to the ratio of neutron-capture cross-sections for nearby isotopes on the s-process path. This approximation is – as the name indicates – only valid locally, meaning for isotopes of nearby mass numbers, but it is invalid at magic numbers where the ledge-precipice structure dominates.

== Termination of the s-process ==
Chart representing the final part of the s-process. Red horizontal lines with a circle in their right ends represent neutron captures; blue arrows pointing up-left represent beta decays; green arrows pointing down-left represent alpha decays; cyan/light-green arrows pointing down-right represent electron captures.

Because of the relatively low neutron fluxes expected to occur during the s-process (on the order of 10^{5} to 10^{11} neutrons per cm^{2} per second), this process does not have the ability to produce any of the heavy radioactive isotopes such as thorium or uranium. The cycle that terminates the s-process includes the stable isotopes Pb-206,207,208 and Bi-209; when the last captures another neutron, it becomes Po-210 (or Bi-210m) then alpha decays back to mass 206. Should another neutron be captured, alpha decay from 211 to 207 is faster yet. The net result of the cycle is that 4 neutrons are fused into one alpha particle with two beta decays.

In fact, this cycle does not reach equilibrium because the neutron cross section of the doubly magic ^{208}Pb is so small that that isotope will accumulate, and very little bismuth is produced in the s-process, as the chart above indicates.

The other magic numbers can behave similarly: the stable nuclei passed through between iron and lead with a magic number of neutrons are Sr-Zr (N = 50) and Ba-Nd (N = 82) and those isotopes all are unusually abundant and the most abundant of their element (the only for the odd elements, except for the extremely rare radioactive lanthanum-138).

== In stardust ==
Stardust is one component of cosmic dust. Stardust is individual solid grains that condensed during mass loss from various long-dead stars. Stardust existed throughout interstellar gas before the birth of the Solar System and was trapped in meteorites when they assembled from interstellar matter contained in the planetary accretion disk in early Solar System. Today they are found in meteorites, where they have been preserved. Meteoriticists habitually refer to them as presolar grains. The s-process enriched grains are mostly silicon carbide (SiC). The origin of these grains is demonstrated by laboratory measurements of extremely unusual isotopic abundance ratios within the grain. First experimental detection of s-process xenon isotopes was made in 1978, confirming earlier predictions that s-process isotopes would be enriched, nearly pure, in stardust from red giant stars. These discoveries launched new insight into astrophysics and into the origin of meteorites in the Solar System. Silicon carbide (SiC) grains condense in the atmospheres of AGB stars and thus trap isotopic abundance ratios as they existed in that star. Because the AGB stars are the main site of the s-process in the galaxy, the heavy elements in the SiC grains contain almost pure s-process isotopes in elements heavier than iron. This fact has been demonstrated repeatedly by sputtering-ion mass spectrometer studies of these stardust presolar grains. Several surprising results have shown that within them the ratio of s-process and r-process abundances is somewhat different from that which was previously assumed. It has also been shown with trapped isotopes of krypton and xenon that the s-process abundances in the AGB-star atmospheres changed with time or from star to star, presumably with the strength of neutron flux in that star or perhaps the temperature. This is a frontier of s-process studies in the 2000s.

== See also ==
- Nucleosynthesis
- r-process
- p-process
