= Dredge-up =

Stage in the evolution of some stars

A dredge-up is any one of several stages in the evolution of some stars. By definition, during a dredge-up, a convection zone extends all the way from the star's surface down to the layers of material that have undergone fusion. Consequently, the fusion products are mixed into the outer layers of the star's atmosphere, where they can be seen in stellar spectra.

== Types ==
- The first dredge-up
  The first dredge-up occurs when a main-sequence star enters the red-giant branch. As a result of the convective mixing, the outer atmosphere will display the spectral signature of hydrogen fusion: The ^{12}C/^{13}C and C/N ratios are lowered, and the surface abundances of lithium and beryllium may be reduced. The counter-intuitive existence of lithium-rich red giant stars that have gone through first dredge-up may be explained by scenarios such as mass transfer.
- The second dredge-up
  The second dredge-up occurs in stars with 4–8 solar masses. When helium fusion comes to an end at the core, convection mixes the products of the CNO cycle. This second dredge-up causes an increase in the surface abundance of ^{4}He and ^{14}N, whereas the amount of ^{12}C and ^{16}O decreases.
- The third dredge-up
  The third dredge-up occurs after a star enters the asymptotic giant branch, after a flash occurs in a helium-burning shell. The third dredge-up brings helium, carbon, and the s-process products to the surface, increasing the abundance of carbon relative to oxygen; in some larger stars this is the process that turns the star into a carbon star.

Note that not all stars will experience all three dredge-up types. For example, some lower-mass stars experience the first and third dredge-ups in their evolution without ever having gone through the second. A period of convection does occur on these stars at the start of the asymptotic giant branch, but does not reach as deep into the star as the first dredge-up; despite this, this period of convection is still sometimes referred to as the second dredge-up for comparison with the evolution of higher-mass stars.
