= EU Andromedae =

Star in the constellation Andromeda

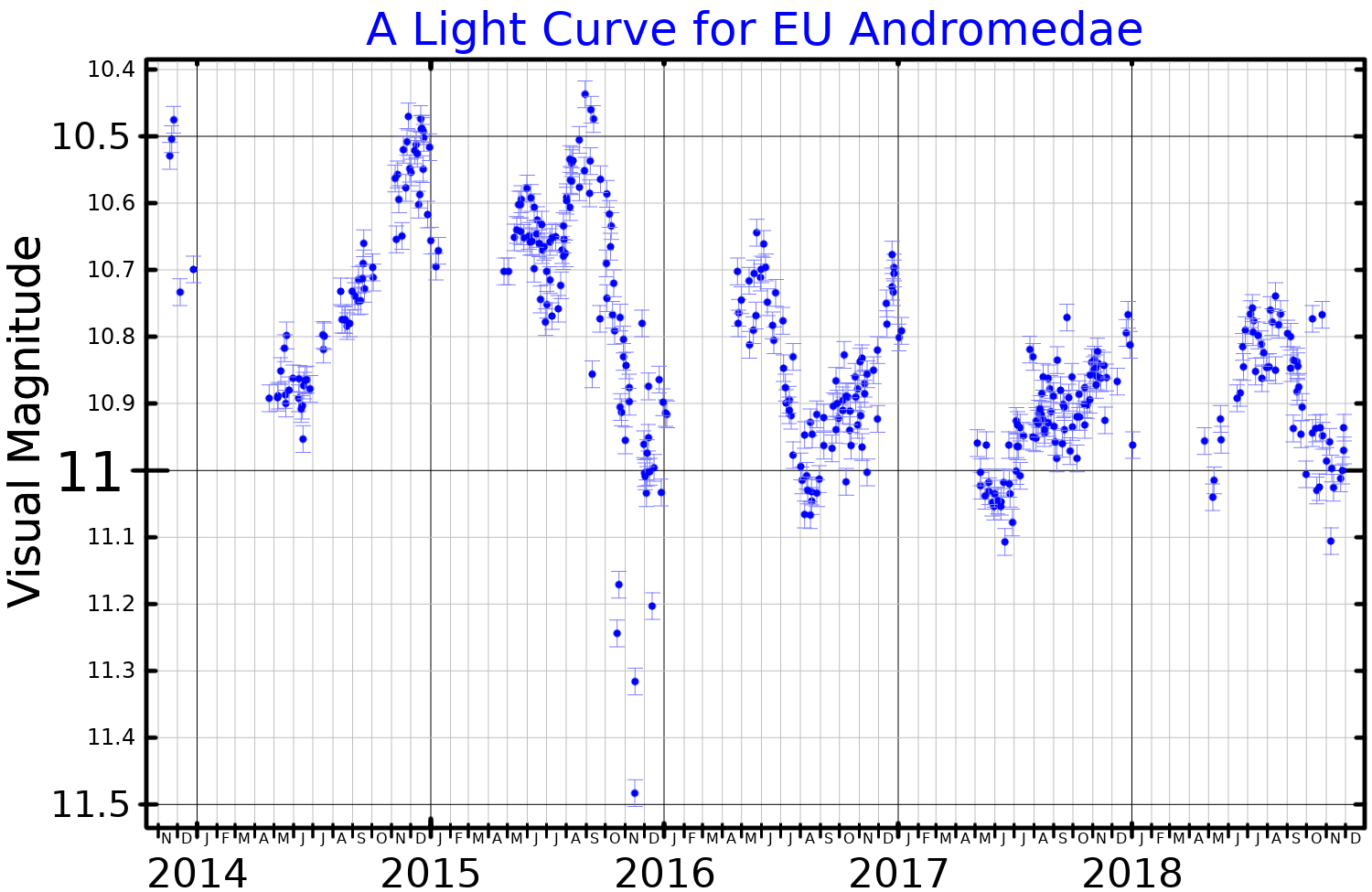
- A visual band light curve for EU Andromedae, plotted from ASAS-SN data.

Observation data Epoch J2000 Equinox ICRS
- Constellation: Andromeda
- Right ascension: 23^{h} 19^{m} 58.8815^{s}
- Declination: +47° 14′ 34.576″
- Apparent magnitude (V): 10.7 – 11.8 variable

Characteristics
- Evolutionary stage: AGB
- Spectral type: C-J5^{−} C_{2}5 j3.5
- Apparent magnitude (B): 12.84
- Apparent magnitude (V): 10.38
- Apparent magnitude (G): 9.0005
- Apparent magnitude (J): 5.526
- Apparent magnitude (H): 4.492
- Apparent magnitude (K): 4.018
- B−V color index: 2.5687
- Variable type: Lb?

Astrometry
Proper motion (μ)	RA: 2.062±0.080 mas/yr Dec.: −3.263±0.072 mas/yr
Parallax (π)	0.6515±0.0561 mas
Distance	5,000 ± 400 ly (1,500 ± 100 pc)

Details
Radius	82 R_{☉}
Luminosity	983 L_{☉}
Temperature	3,579 K

Other designations
- 2MASS J23195888+4714345, TYC 3640-752-1

Database references
SIMBAD	data

EU Andromedae (often abbreviated to EU And) is a carbon star in the constellation Andromeda. Its apparent visual magnitude varies in an irregular manner between 10.7 and 11.8.

EU Andromedae was reported to be a carbon star by Oliver J. Lee et al. in 1947, based on objective prism observations undertaken as part of a Dearborn Observatory study of faint red stars. Years later, the variability of EU Andromedae was discovered by French amateur astronomer Roger Weber, who examined the star on photographic plates that he and Giuliano Romano had taken from May 1959 through October 1961. Weber announced the discovery in 1962 and noted that it was probably a long period variable, but he could not determine if it was a semi-regular or a Mira variable. It is number 149 in his catalog. There is some disagreement in the literature about what class of variable star EU Andromedae belongs to, with some researchers listing it as a slow irregular variable, and others listing it as a semi-regular variable.

Infrared observations of EU Andromedae show the presence of silicate grains, indicating the presence of an oxygen-rich circumstellar shell around the star, a combination known as a silicate star. Subsequently, a water maser was detected around this star (and for the first time around a carbon star), confirming the existence of the shell. The most recent observations suggest that the maser originated in a circumstellar disc, seen nearly edge-on, around an unseen companion with a minimum mass of 0.5 M_{☉}. Carbon dioxide has been detected for the first time in a silicate carbon star around EU Andromedae.

EU Andromedae is given as the standard star for the C-J5^{−} spectral class. C-J spectral types are assigned to stars with strong isotopic bands of carbon molecules, defined as the ratio of ^{12}C to ^{13}C being less than four. A more complete spectral type includes the abundance indices C_{2}5 j3.5, which indicate the Swan band strength and the isotopic band ratio.
