= TYC 1031-1262-1 =

Binary star in the constellation Hercules

- Location of TYC 1031-1262-1 (circled)

Observation data Epoch J2000 Equinox J2000
- Constellation: Hercules
- Right ascension: 18^{h} 26^{m} 11.50390^{s}
- Declination: +12° 12′ 34.9356″
- Apparent magnitude (V): 11.64

Characteristics
- Spectral type: F8II + G6II
- B−V color index: +0.77
- J−H color index: +0.368
- J−K color index: +0.473
- Variable type: Eclipsing binary, Type II Cepheid (A)

Astrometry
Proper motion (μ)	RA: 1.692 mas/yr Dec.: 0.469 mas/yr
Parallax (π)	0.3836±0.0177 mas
Distance	5070±250 pc

Orbit
Primary	TYC 1031-1262-1 A
Companion	TYC 1031-1262-1 B
Period (P)	51.2857±0.0174 d
Semi-major axis (a)	79.58±2.54 R_{☉} (0.3701±0.0118 AU)
Eccentricity (e)	0.001±0.001
Inclination (i)	74.0±0.4°
Semi-amplitude (K_{1}) (primary)	27.4±1.7 km/s
Semi-amplitude (K_{2}) (secondary)	48.1±1.7 km/s

Details

TYC 1031-1262-1 A
Mass	1.640±0.151 M_{☉}
Radius	26.9±0.9 R_{☉}
Luminosity	764±144 L_{☉}
Surface gravity (log g)	1.792±0.021 cgs
Temperature	5880±200 K

TYC 1031-1262-1 B
Mass	0.934±0.109 M_{☉}
Radius	15.0±0.7 R_{☉}
Luminosity	109±26 L_{☉}
Surface gravity (log g)	2.057+0.040 −0.044 cgs
Temperature	4890±125 K

Other designations
- Gaia DR3 4484245443888652032, TIC 287553455, TYC 1031-1262-1, GSC 01031-01262, 2MASS J18261150+1212349, ASAS J182611+1212.6, USNO-B1.0 1022-00398518

Database references
SIMBAD	data

TYC 1031-1262-1 is a spectroscopic binary in the northern constellation of Hercules, near the border with Ophiuchus, approximately 5,070 parsecs (16,500 light-years) distant. With an apparent magnitude of 11.64, it is too faint to be seen by the naked eye, but is observable using a telescope with an aperture of 60 mm (2.4 in) or larger.

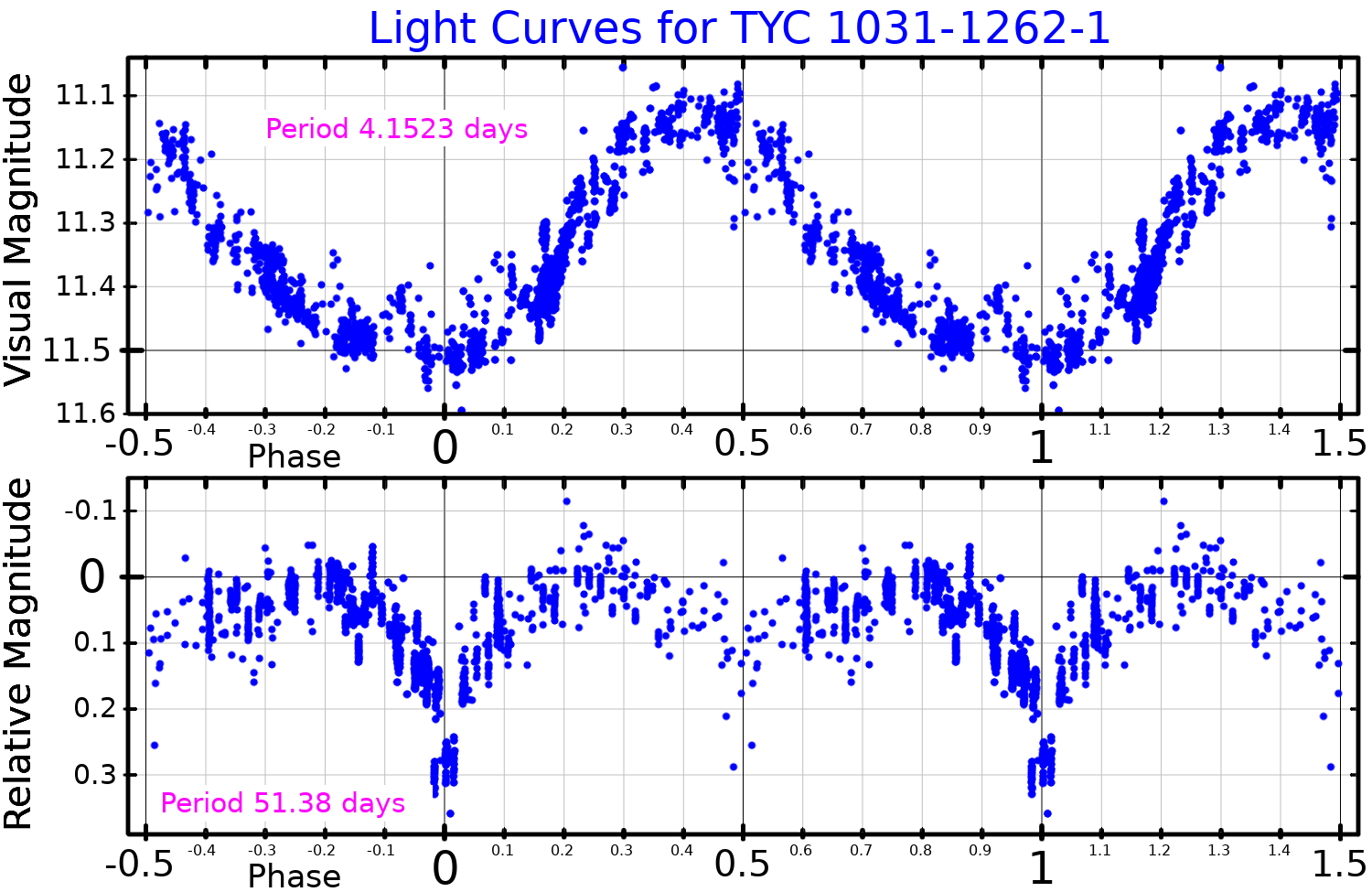
A light curve for TYC 1031-1262-1, adapted from Antipin et al.. The upper plot shows the variability due to pulsations, with the orbit-related variability removed, and the lower plot shows orbit-related variability, with the pulsation effects removed.

The star's variability was first detected in 2005. In 2007, it was reported as the first eclipsing binary system with a type II Cepheid component to be detected in the Milky Way. It also had the shortest period of any known Cepheid binary at that time. A follow-up study in 2013, however, argues that the pulsating component is too massive to be a type II Cepheid and thus is instead an anomalous Cepheid, an object located between classical Cepheids and type II Cepheids in the Hertzsprung-Russell diagram. A similar object, NSV 10993 (V1135 Herculis), was discovered in 2008.

== Physical properties ==
The two components are both evolved bright giants (luminosity class II), more luminous than normal giant stars but less so than supergiants. (Note: Despite giving both stars the luminosity class II, Sipahi et al. (2013) simultaneously refers to both stars as supergiants in their conclusion.) The brighter of the pair (hereafter component "A") is the Cepheid that pulsates at a period of 4.15270 days, which is increasing at a rate of 2.46±0.54 min/yr for unknown reasons. It is 64% more massive than the Sun but has ballooned to 27 times the girth, radiating 764 times the luminosity of the Sun from its photosphere at an effective temperature of 5,880 K (5,610 °C; 10,120 °F), corresponding to its spectral type of F8II. Its dimmer G6II companion (B) is slightly less massive than the Sun and cooler at 4,890 K (4,620 °C; 8,340 °F), but has a radius 15 times larger and emits a little over 100 times the solar luminosity.

A and B revolve around each other with an orbital period of 51.2857 days at a distance of 0.3701 AU (55,370,000 km), only twice the sum of their radii. As a result of this close proximity, the pulsation and evolution of A has been affected. Furthermore, A fills nearly 85% of its Roche lobe, while B occupies 61%, meaning that a loss or transfer of mass has likely occurred from A. The amplitude of the brightness changes caused by one star eclipsing the other is relatively small, which implies that the two stars only partially eclipse each other.

The star is a member of the thick disk population, located 970 parsecs (3,200 ly) from the Galactic plane.

== Nearby objects ==
Follow-up observations on the star in 2008 revealed nine new variable stars in the immediate vicinity, including seven eclipsing binaries, one RR Lyrae variable, and one long-period, irregular or semiregular variable star.

== See also ==
- V1334 Cygni: a binary system containing a classical Cepheid variable.
