= CH star =

Stars with strong methylidyne absorption bands in their spectra

CH stars are particular type of carbon stars which are characterized by the presence of exceedingly strong absorption bands due to CH (methylidyne) in their spectra. They belong to the stellar population II, meaning they are metal poor and generally pretty middle-aged stars, and are under-luminous compared to the classical C–N carbon stars. The term 'CH star' was coined by Philip C. Keenan in 1942 as a sub-type of the C classification, which he used for carbon stars. The main molecular feature used in identifying the initial set of five CH stars lies in the Fraunhaufer G band.

In 1975, Yasuho Yamashita noted that some higher temperature carbon stars displayed the typical spectral characteristics of a CH star, but did not have the same kinematic properties. That is, they did not have the higher space velocities characteristic of the older stellar population. These were dubbed CH-like stars. Many CH stars are known to be members of binary star systems, and it is reasonable to believe this is (or was) the case for all CH stars. Like Barium stars, they are probably the result of a mass transfer from a former classical carbon star companion, now a degenerate white dwarf, to the current CH-classed star.
