= Barium star =

Class of star

Barium stars are spectral class G to K stars whose spectra indicate an overabundance of s-process elements by the presence of singly ionized barium, Ba II, at λ 455.4 nm. Barium stars also show enhanced spectral features of carbon, the bands of the molecules CH, CN and C_{2}. The class was originally recognized and defined by William P. Bidelman and Philip Keenan. Initially, after their discovery, it was thought the category was limited to red giants, but the same chemical signature has been observed in main-sequence stars as well.

Observational studies of their radial velocity suggested that all barium stars are binary stars. Observations in the ultraviolet using International Ultraviolet Explorer detected white dwarfs in some barium star systems.

Barium stars are believed to be the result of mass transfer in a binary star system. The mass transfer occurred when the now-observed giant star was on the main sequence. Its companion, the donor star, was a carbon star on the asymptotic giant branch (AGB), and had produced carbon and s-process elements in its interior. These nuclear fusion products were mixed by convection to its surface. Some of that matter "polluted" the surface layers of the main-sequence star as the donor star lost mass at the end of its AGB evolution, and it subsequently evolved to become a white dwarf. These systems are being observed at an indeterminate amount of time after the mass transfer event, when the donor star has long been a white dwarf. Depending on the initial properties of the binary system, the polluted star can be found at different evolutionary stages.

During its evolution, the barium star will at times be larger and cooler than the limits of the spectral types G or K. When this happens, ordinarily such a star is spectral type M, but its s-process excesses may cause it to show its altered composition as another spectral peculiarity. While the star's surface temperature is in the M-type regime, the star may show molecular features of the s-process element zirconium, zirconium oxide (ZrO) bands. When this happens, the star will appear as an "extrinsic" S star.

Historically, barium stars posed a puzzle, because in standard stellar evolution theory G and K giants are not far enough along in their evolution to have synthesized carbon and s-process elements and mix them to their surfaces. The discovery of the stars' binary nature resolved the puzzle, putting the source of their spectral peculiarities into a companion star which should have produced such material. The mass transfer episode is believed to be quite brief on an astronomical timescale.

Prototypical barium stars include Zeta Capricorni, HR 774, and HR 4474.

The CH stars are Population II stars with similar evolutionary state, spectral peculiarities, and orbital statistics, and are believed to be the older, metal-poor analogs of the barium stars.
