= Long-period variable star =

Cool luminous pulsating variable star

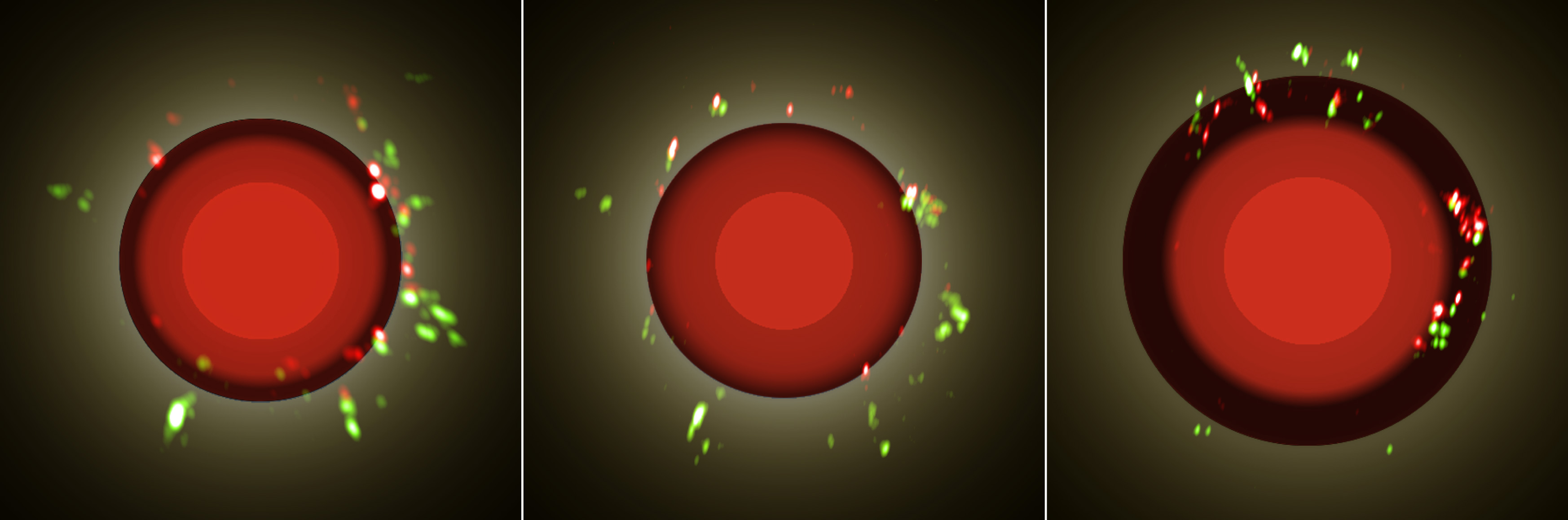
Pulsations of S Orionis, showing dust production and masers (ESO)

The descriptive term long-period variable (LPV) star refers to various groups of cool luminous pulsating variable stars.

== Types of variation ==
The General Catalogue of Variable Stars does not define a long-period variable star type, although it does describe Mira variables as long-period variables. The term was first used in the 19th century, before more precise classifications of variable stars, to refer to a group that were known to vary on timescales typically hundreds of days. By the middle of the 20th century, long period variables were known to be cool giant stars. The relationship of Mira variables, semiregular variables, and other pulsating stars was being investigated and the term long period variable was generally restricted to the coolest pulsating stars, almost all Mira variables. Semiregular variables were considered intermediate between LPVs and Cepheids.

After the publication of the General Catalogue of Variable Stars, both Mira variables and semiregular variables, particularly those of type SRa, were often considered as long period variables. At its broadest, LPVs include Mira, semiregular, slow irregular variables, and OGLE small amplitude red giants (OSARGs), including both giant and supergiant stars. The OSARGs are generally not treated as LPVs, and many authors continue to use the term more restrictively to refer just to Mira and semiregular variables, or solely to Miras. The AAVSO LPV Section covers "Miras, Semiregulars, RV Tau and all your favorite red giants".

The AAVSO LPV Section covers the Mira, SR, and L stars, but also RV Tauri variables, another type of large cool slowly varying star. This includes SRc and Lc stars which are respectively semi-regular and irregular cool supergiants. Recent researches have increasingly focused on the long period variables as only AGB and possibly red giant tip stars. The recently classified OSARGs are by far the most numerous of these stars, comprising a high proportion of red giants.

== Properties ==
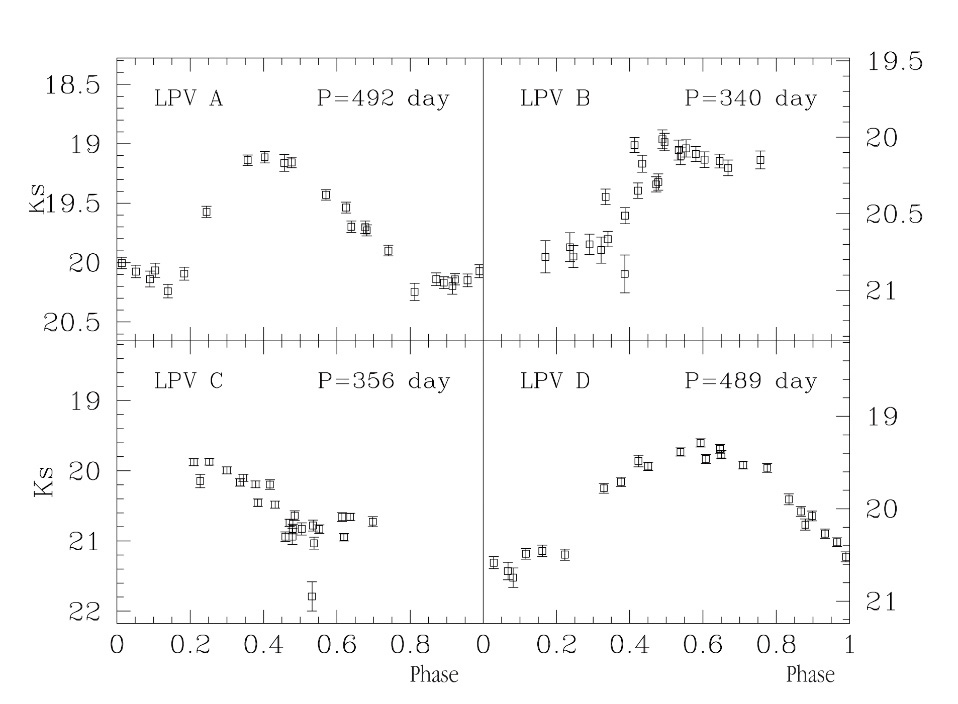
Light curves of four Mira variables in the galaxy Centaurus A

Long period variables are pulsating cool giant, or supergiant, variable stars with periods from around a hundred days, or just a few days for OSARGs, to more than a thousand days. In some cases, the variations are too poorly defined to identify a period, although it is an open question whether they are truly non-periodic.

LPVs have spectral class F and redwards, but most are spectral class M, S or C. Many of the reddest stars in the sky, such as Y CVn, V Aql, and VX Sgr are LPVs.

Most LPVs, including all Mira variables, are thermally-pulsing asymptotic giant branch stars with luminosities several thousand times the sun. Some semiregular and irregular variables are less luminous giant stars, while others are more luminous supergiants including some of the largest known stars such as VY CMa.

== Long secondary periods ==
Between a quarter and a half of long period variables show very slow variations with an amplitude up to one magnitude at visual wavelengths, and a period around ten times the primary pulsation period. These are called long secondary periods. The causes of the long secondary periods are unknown. Binary interactions, dust formation, rotation, or non-radial oscillations have all been proposed as causes, but all have problems explaining the observations.

== Pulsation modes ==
Mira variables are mostly fundamental mode pulsators, while the semiregular and irregular variables on the asymptotic giant branch pulsate in the first, second, or third overtone. Many of the less regular LPVs pulsate in more than one mode.

Long secondary periods cannot be caused by fundamental mode radial pulsations or their harmonics, but strange mode pulsations are one possible explanation.
