= Edith Kellman =

American astronomer (1911–2007)

- Born: April 4, 1911
- Died: May 11, 2007 (aged 96)
- Education: Wheaton College
- Known for: MKK system of stellar classification
- Scientific career
- Fields: Astronomy

Edith Kellman (April 4, 1911 – May 11, 2007, Walworth, Wisconsin) was a noted American astronomer who is known for her work on the Yerkes system of stellar classification, also called the MKK system.

== Early life ==
Kellman was born in Walworth, Wisconsin, and attended Wheaton College in Wheaton, Illinois.

== Career ==
Kellman worked at the Yerkes Observatory as a photographic assistant, where she worked with William Morgan and Philip Keenan to develop the Yerkes system, an influential system of stellar classification. The MKK classification system was introduced in 1943 and was used by Morgan, Keenan, and Kellman to map the spiral structure of the Milky way using O and B stars. A variation on this system is still used today in stellar classification.

After leaving the observatory, she taught mathematics at Williams Bay High School until her retirement in the 1970s.
