= La Superba =

Variable star in the constellation Canes Venatici

- Location of Y Canum Venaticorum (circled in red)

Observation data Epoch J2000.0 Equinox ICRS
- Constellation: Canes Venatici
- Right ascension: 12^{h} 45^{m} 07.826^{s}
- Declination: +45° 26′ 24.93″
- Apparent magnitude (V): +4.86 to +7.32

Characteristics
- Evolutionary stage: AGB
- Spectral type: C5_{4}J(N3)
- U−B color index: 6.62
- B−V color index: 2.54
- V−R color index: 1.75
- R−I color index: 1.38
- Variable type: SRb

Astrometry
Radial velocity (R_{v})	15.30 km/s
Proper motion (μ)	RA: −2.968 mas/yr Dec.: 13.063 mas/yr
Parallax (π)	3.2222±0.1744 mas
Distance	1,010 ± 50 ly (310 ± 20 pc)
Absolute magnitude (M_{V})	−1.203

Details
Mass	1.2 M_{☉}
Radius	315 R_{☉}
Luminosity	4,400 – 9,400 L_{☉}
Surface gravity (log g)	+0.23 cgs
Temperature	2,600 - 3,200 K
Metallicity [Fe/H]	−0.21 dex

Other designations
- La Superba, Y Canum Venaticorum, HR 4846, HD 110914, BD+46°1817, FK5 1327, HIP 62223, SAO 44317, GC 17342, 152 Schjellerup

Database references
SIMBAD	data

La Superba (Y CVn, Y Canum Venaticorum) is a strikingly red giant star in the constellation Canes Venatici. It is faintly visible to the naked eye, and the red colour is very obvious in binoculars. It is a carbon star and semiregular variable. Its name in Italian means "the magnificent [star]". The 19th-century astronomer Angelo Secchi called its spectrum "superba", which was turned into the proper name La Superba by the Irish astronomer John Birmingham in 1876. The name La Superba was officially adopted for this star by the IAU in 2018.

== Visibility ==
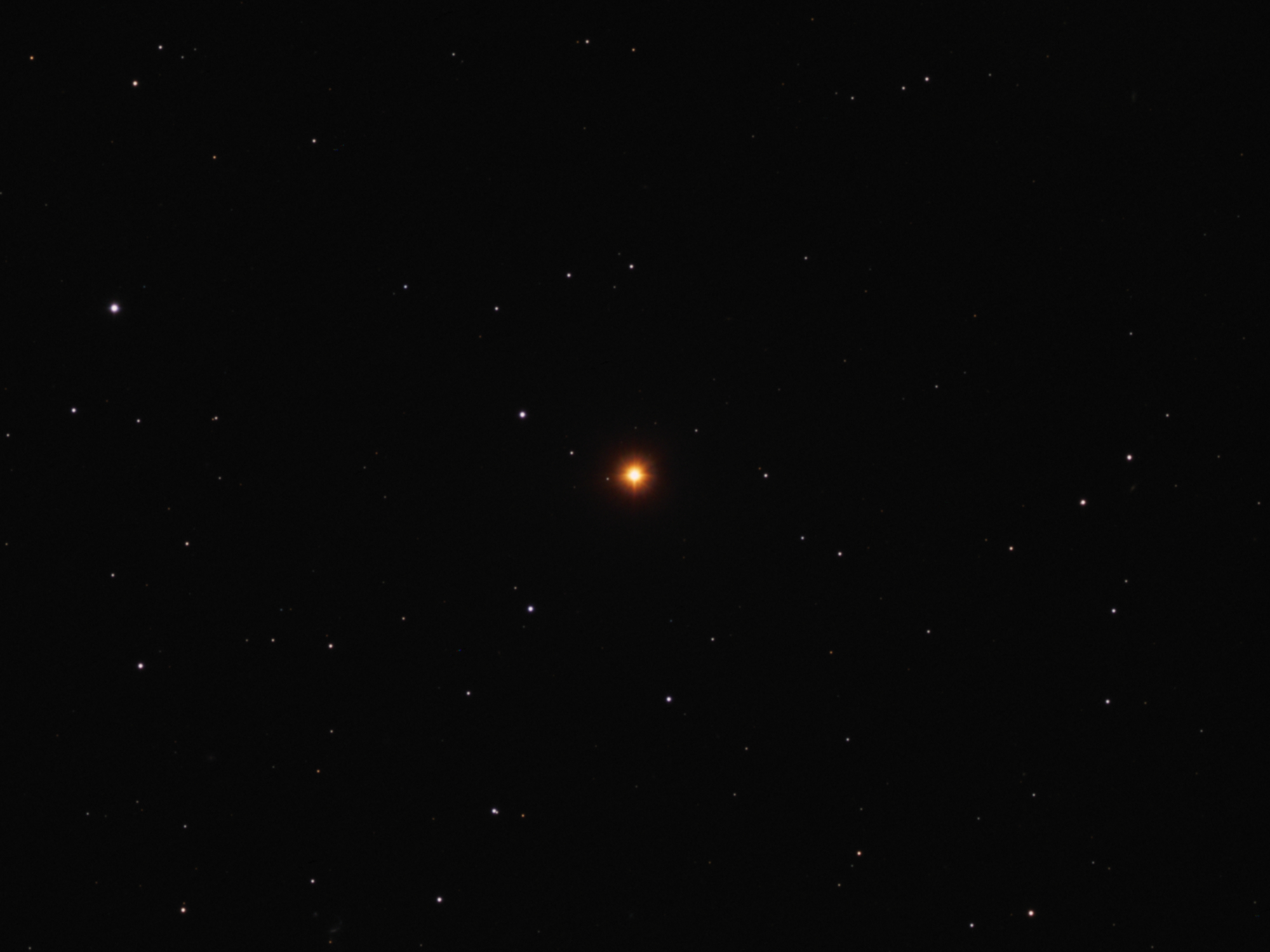
Y Canum Venaticorum in optical light

La Superba is a semiregular variable star, varying by about a magnitude over a roughly 160-day cycle, but with slower variation over a larger range. Periods of 194 and 186 days have been suggested, with a resonance between the periods.

Y CVn is one of the reddest stars known, and it is among the brightest of the giant red carbon stars. It is the brightest of known J-stars, which are a very rare category of carbon stars that contain large amounts of carbon-13 (carbon atoms with 7 neutrons instead of the usual 6).

== Properties ==
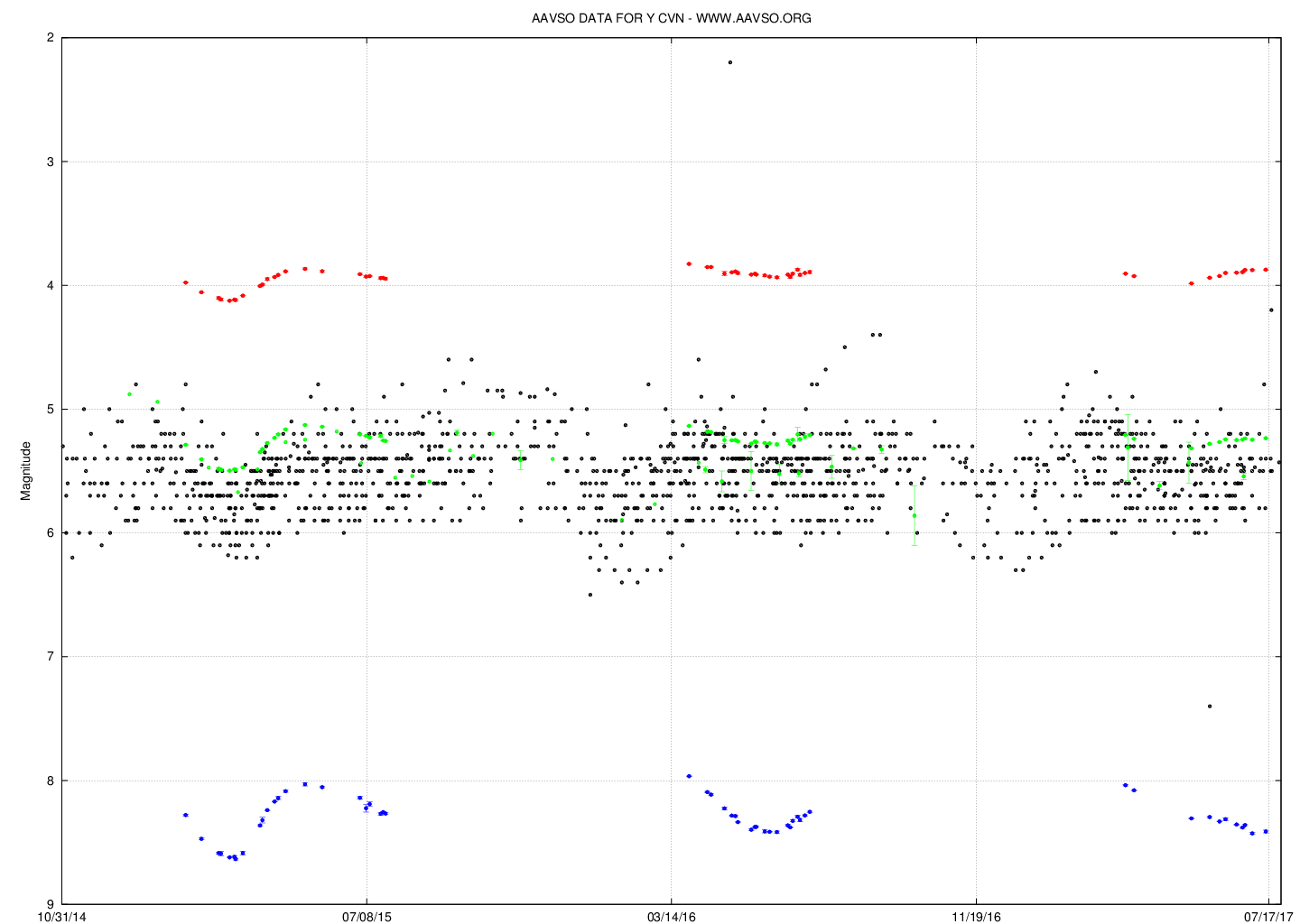
Y Canum Venaticorum light curve, including RGB photoelectric measurements

Calculations with La Superba's luminosity and effective temperature give it a radius of about 315 R_{☉}. If it were placed at the position of the Sun, the star's surface would extend beyond Earth's orbit.

La Superba's temperature is believed to be about 2,760 K, making it one of the coolest stars known. When infrared radiation is included, Y CVn has a bolometric luminosity several thousand times that of the Sun. The mass of this type of star is difficult to determine; it would initially have been around 3 M_{☉} and somewhat less now due to mass loss. An estimate from Jim Kaler gives the star a luminosity between 22,000 and 87,000 L_{☉} and radius between 557 and 1,092 R_{☉} based on an assumed temperature of 3,000 K, and the author then classified it as a C7 or CN5 supergiant star although its mass is too low to be a true supergiant.

Observations in the 60 and 100 micron infrared bands by the IRAS satellite showed that Y CVn is surrounded by a dust shell 0.9 parsecs in diameter. This is one of the most prominent circumstellar dust shells detected in the IRAS all-sky survey.

== Evolution ==
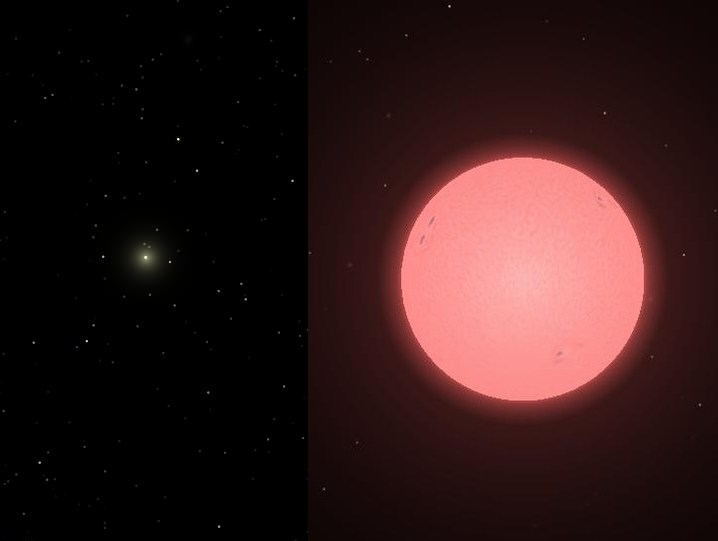
Y CVn and the Sun at the same distance; rendered with Celestia

After stars up to a few times the mass of the sun have finished fusing hydrogen to helium in their core, they start to burn hydrogen in a shell outside a degenerate helium core, and expand dramatically into the red giant state. Once the core reaches a high enough temperature, it ignites violently in the helium flash, which begins helium core burning on the horizontal branch. Once even the core helium is exhausted, a degenerate carbon-oxygen core remains. Fusion continues in both hydrogen and helium shells at different depths in the star, and the star increases luminosity on the asymptotic giant branch (AGB). La Superba is currently an AGB star.

In the AGB stars, fusion products are moved outwards from the core by strong deep convection known as a dredge-up, thus creating a carbon abundance in the outer atmosphere where carbon monoxide and other compounds are formed. These molecules tend to absorb radiation at shorter wavelengths, resulting in a spectrum with even less blue and violet compared to ordinary red giants, giving the star its distinguished red color.

La Superba is most likely in the final stages of fusing its remaining secondary fuel (helium) into carbon and shedding its mass at the rate of about a million times that of the Sun's solar wind. It is also surrounded by a 2.5 light year-wide shell of previously ejected material, implying that at one point it must have been losing mass as much as 50 times faster than it is now. La Superba thus appears almost ready to eject its outer layers to form a planetary nebula, leaving behind its core in the form of a white dwarf.
