= Philip Childs Keenan =

American astronomer

- Born: March 31, 1908; Bellevue, Pennsylvania, USA
- Died: April 20, 2000 (aged 92); Columbus, Ohio, USA
- Scientific career
- Fields: astronomer
- Workplaces: Yerkes Observatory, Perkins Observatory

Philip Childs Keenan (March 31, 1908 – April 20, 2000) was an American astronomer.

Keenan was an American spectroscopist who collaborated with William Wilson Morgan and Edith Kellman (1911–2007) to develop the MKK stellar spectral classification system between 1939 and 1943. This two-dimensional classification system (temperature & luminosity) was further revised by Morgan and Keenan in 1973. The MK system remains the standard stellar spectral classification system used by astronomers today.

During their long collaboration, Keenan tended to focus his research on stars cooler than the Sun, while Morgan emphasized the hotter stars. Keenan had a long and productive career, publishing his final scientific paper in 1999, seventy years after his first.

== Honors ==
Named after him

- Asteroid 10030 Philkeenan
