= Stephenson 2 DFK 52 =

Red supergiant star in open cluster Stephenson 2

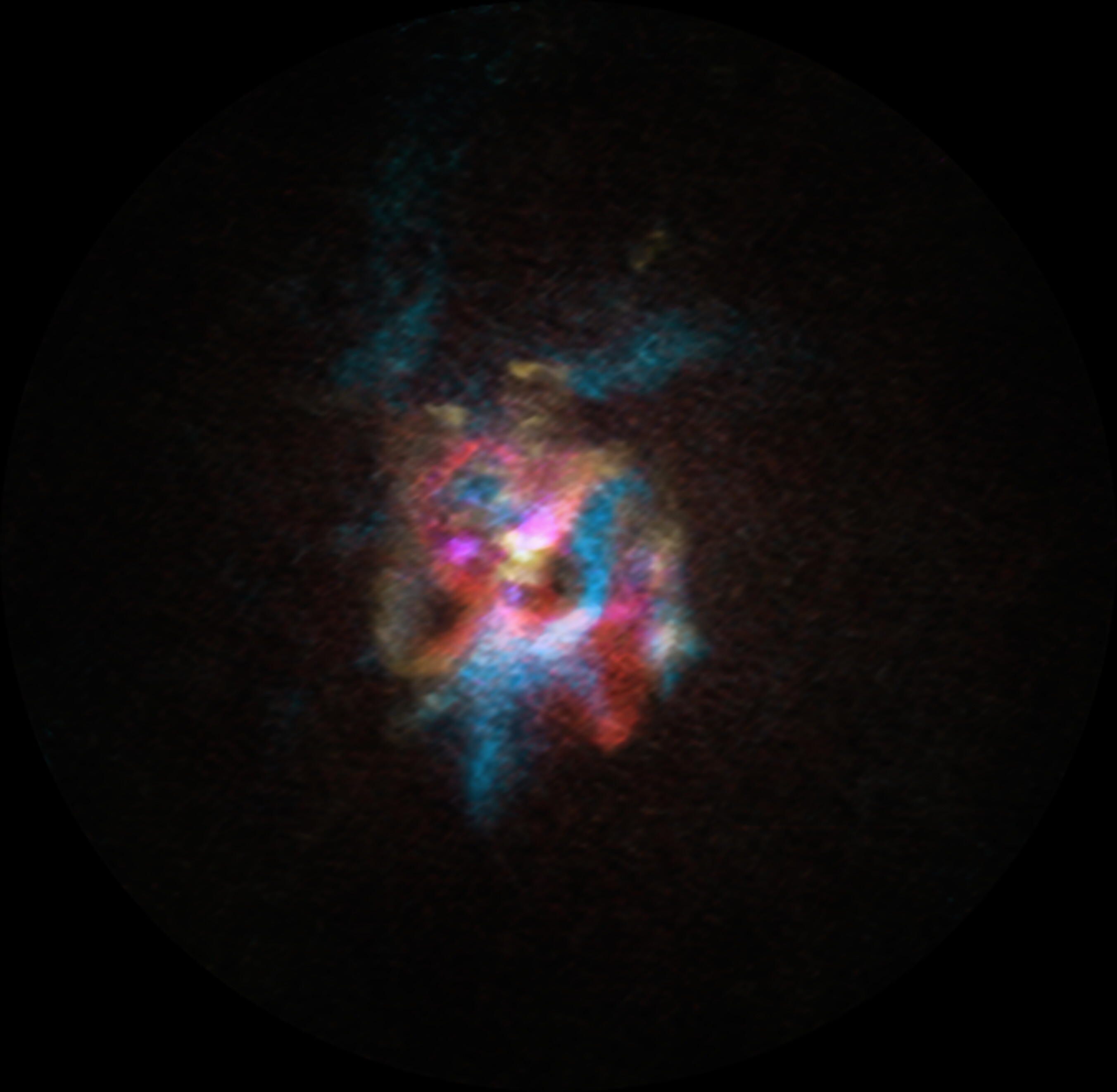
- ALMA image of Stephenson 2 DFK 52 and its surrounding dust and gas cloud Credit: ALMA(ESO/NAOJ/NRAO)/M. Siebert et al.

Observation data Epoch J2000.0 Equinox ICRS
- Constellation: Scutum
- Right ascension: 18^{h} 39^{m} 23.4^{s}
- Declination: −06° 02′ 16″
- Apparent magnitude (V): 17.6

Characteristics
- Evolutionary stage: Red supergiant
- Spectral type: M0I
- Apparent magnitude (J): 11.27
- Apparent magnitude (H): 8.76
- Apparent magnitude (K): 7.42

Astrometry
Distance	19,000+6,230 −2,540 ly (5,830+1,910 −780 pc)

Details
Radius	335 – 357 R_{☉}
Luminosity	20,900 – 24,000 L_{☉}
Temperature	3,790 – 3,800 K

Other designations
- Stephenson 2 DFK 52, TIC 328138534, 2MASS J18392341-0602158

Database references
SIMBAD	data

Stephenson 2 DFK 52 is a red supergiant star located in the open cluster Stephenson 2 in the constellation Scutum at a distance of about 4,900 light-years from Earth. The star gained attention in 2025 following Atacama Large Millimeter/submillimeter Array (ALMA) observations that revealed a large circumstellar outflow of dust and gas, the largest known circumstellar outflow around any red supergiant star.

== Observation history ==
The open cluster Stephenson 2 was discovered by American astronomer Charles Bruce Stephenson in 1990 in the data obtained by a deep infrared survey. The cluster is also known as RSGC2, one of several massive open clusters in Scutum, each containing multiple red supergiants. The 52nd brightest star in the K band was given an identifier number of 52.

== Circumstellar environment ==
CO line emission map of Stephenson 2 DFK 52, viewed by ALMA

ALMA observations in 2023–2024 revealed that Stephenson 2 DFK 52 is surrounded by a large dust and gas outflow extending up to 50,000 AU in radius (or approximately 0.8 light-years). If the star was located at the distance Betelgeuse is from our Solar System, this circumstellar cocoon would appear roughly one-third the angular width of the full moon.

This suggests that the star went through a dramatic mass-loss event ~4,000 years ago, resulting in the incredibly large dust envelope. Estimates suggest the total mass loss to the extended circumstellar material at 0.1–1 M_{☉}. The scale and asymmetry of the mass ejection cannot be easily explained by radiation pressure alone, suggesting possible additional mechanisms such as a short-lived superwind phase or multiple star interactions and the star is a progenitor for a Type II-P supernova explosion.

== See also ==
- Stephenson 2 DFK 1
- Stephenson 2 DFK 49
