= Alicante 10 =

Open cluster with several red supergiants in the constellation Scutum

Observation data (J2000 epoch)
- Right ascension: 18^{h} 45^{m} 30^{s}
- Declination: −03° 40′ 00″
- Distance: ~19.6 kly (~6 kpc)
- Apparent magnitude (V): not visible
- Apparent dimensions (V): 6′

Physical characteristics
- Mass: (1–2)×10^{4} M_{☉}
- Radius: ~5 pc
- Estimated age: 16–20 Ma
- Other designations: RSGC6

Associations
- Constellation: Scutum

Alicante 10, also known as RSGC6 (Red Supergiant Cluster 6), is a young massive open cluster belonging to the Milky Way galaxy. It was discovered in 2012 in the 2MASS survey data. Currently, eight red supergiants have been identified in this cluster. Alicante 10 is located in the constellation Scutum at the distance of about 6000 pc from the Sun. It is likely situated at the intersection of the northern end of the Long Bar of the Milky Way and the inner portion of the Scutum–Centaurus Arm – one of the two major spiral arms.

The age of Alicante 10 is estimated to be around 16–20 million years. The observed red supergiants are type II supernova progenitors. The cluster is heavily obscured and have not been detected in the visible light. It lies close to other groupings of red supergiants known as RSGC1, Stephenson 2 (RSGC2), RSGC3, Alicante 8 (RSGC4), and Alicante 7 (RSGC5). Alicante 10 is located 16′ southwards of RSGC3. The red supergiant clusters RSGC3, Alicante 7 and Alicante 10 seems to be part of the RSGC3 complex. The mass of the open cluster is estimated at 10–20 thousand solar masses, which makes it one of the most massive open clusters in the Galaxy.
