= Alicante 7 =

Open cluster rich in red supergiants in the constellation Scutum

Observation data (J2000 epoch)
- Right ascension: 18^{h} 44^{m} 29.45^{s}
- Declination: −03° 30′ 02.4″
- Distance: 19.6 kly (6 kpc)
- Apparent magnitude (V): not visible
- Apparent dimensions (V): ~7′

Physical characteristics
- Mass: ~10000 M_{☉}
- Radius: ~6 pc (Note: The radius of Alicante 7 can be calculated using the angular size and the distance)
- Estimated age: 16–20 myr
- Other designations: RSGC5

Associations
- Constellation: Scutum

Alicante 7, also known as RSGC5, (Red Supergiant Cluster 5) is an open cluster rich in red supergiants found in the Scutum-Crux Arm of the Milky Way Galaxy, along with RSGC1, Stephenson 2, RSGC3, Alicante 8, and Alicante 10. Alicante 7 contains 7 red supergiants, making it one of the most massive open clusters known.
