= Stephenson 2 DFK 49 =

Star within the open cluster Stephenson 2

Observation data Epoch J2000 Equinox J2000
- Constellation: Scutum
- Right ascension: 18^{h} 39^{m} 05.586^{s}
- Declination: −06° 04′ 26.58″

Characteristics
- Evolutionary stage: supergiant
- Spectral type: K4
- Apparent magnitude (K): 7.324

Astrometry
Radial velocity (R_{v})	101–109.4 km/s

Details
Radius	255 ± 43 (Note: Calculated, using the Stefan–Boltzmann law and the star's effective temperature and luminosity, with respect to the solar nominal effective temperature of 5,772 K: $$\sqrt{\biggl(\frac{5,772}{4,000}\biggr)^4 \cdot 15,000} = 255\ R_\odot.$$) R_{☉}
Luminosity	15,000±5,000 L_{☉}
Temperature	4,000 K

Other designations
- Stephenson 2 DFK 49, St2-11, MSX6C G026.1215-00.0345, TIC 7759844, 2MASS J18390558-0604265, DENIS J183905.5-060425

Database references
SIMBAD	data

Stephenson 2 DFK 49 or St2-11 is a supergiant star in the constellation Scutum, in the massive open cluster Stephenson 2. It loses mass at a very high rate, resulting in large amounts of infrared excess.

== Observation history ==
The open cluster Stephenson 2 was discovered by American astronomer Charles Bruce Stephenson in 1990 in the data obtained by a deep infrared survey. The cluster is also known as RSGC2, one of several massive open clusters in Scutum, each containing multiple red supergiants. The 49th brightest star in the K band was given an identifier number of 49. The authors noted that the star likely had significant circumstellar and interstellar extinction, higher than even the other cluster members, and noted that its spectral type places it near yellow hypergiants on the Hertzsprung–Russell diagram (HR Diagram), though not as hot.

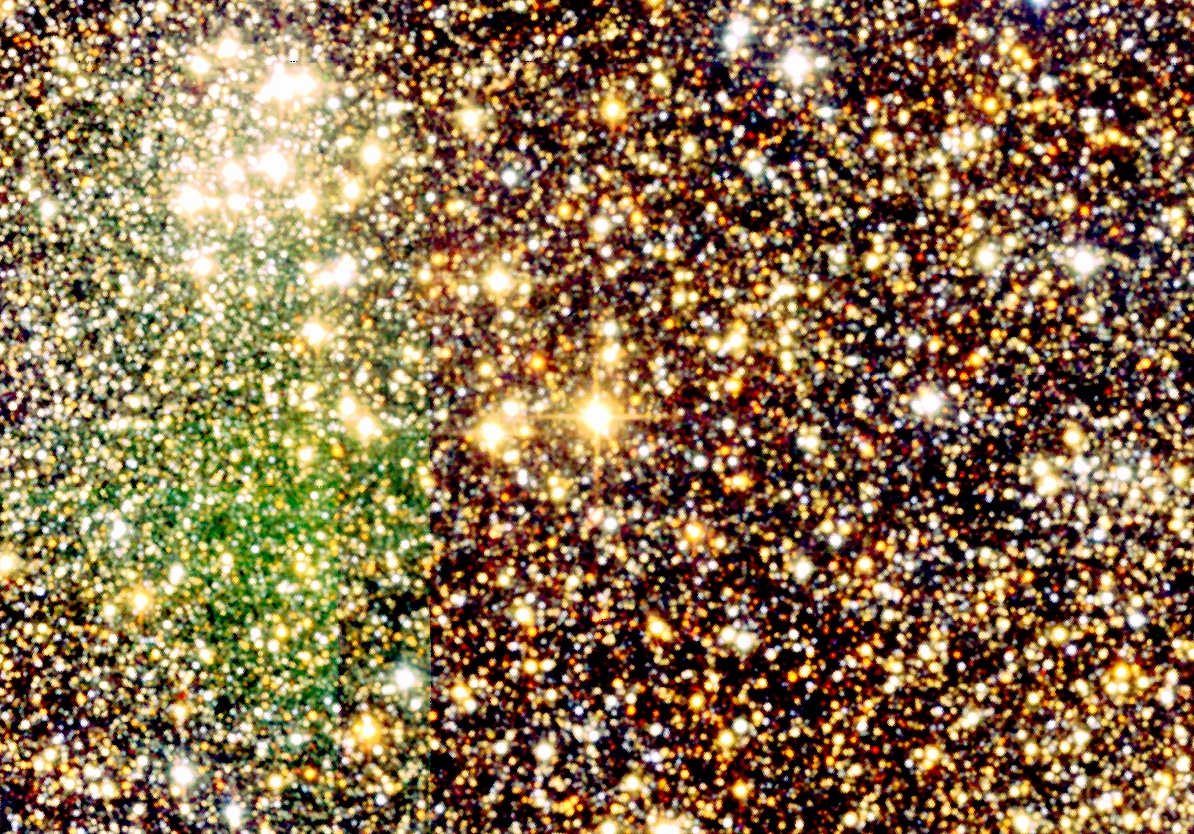
An image of Stephenson 2 DFK 1, the brightest star at the centre of the image. Stephenson 2 DFK 49 is the very red and dim star to the upper-left of St2 DFK 1

In a later study from 2010, the same star was given the identifier number 11, and was grouped with a proposed cluster assumed to be associated with Stephenson 2, Stephenson 2-SW. The star showed maser emissions at some spectral lines. A later study corroborates this. The study mentions a weak CO emission with radial velocities similar to Stephenson 2 DFK 49, but it is said to be unrelated due to being too intense for a red supergiant at Stephenson 2 DFK 49’s distance. Another study observed and studied 57 red supergiant stars across the galaxy and gave estimates of the stars' properties based on their Spectral Energy Distributions, like luminosity and temperature. In 2016, it was compared to the yellow hypergiant star IRAS 18357-0604, which can be found in the same general region as Stephenson 2.

A recent study on red supergiant mass loss rates and histories notes it as the most interesting object in the cluster, because its spectral energy distribution, which has a significant infrared excess, is similar to that of the famous and extreme red hypergiant VY Canis Majoris. However, Stephenson 2 DFK 49 is hotter. The study also estimates the possible mass loss rates of the star, as well as its other properties.

== Properties ==
Stephenson 2 DFK 49 was known to be an interesting object since its home cluster was first studied in depth. An interesting note about Stephenson 2 DFK 49 is that it appears to be at the center of a bow-shock structure in infrared images. Because of its properties and likely position on the H-R diagram, the authors of Davies 2007 stated that both it and Stephenson 2 DFK 1 warranted further studies, especially in terms of stellar evolution. Its properties, an earlier than usual spectral type compared to other stars in Stephenson 2, its luminosity and position on the HR Diagram indicate that it is similar to the extreme yellow hypergiant star IRC+10420 and Variable A in the Triangulum Galaxy (M33). Stephenson 2 DFK 49 is comparable to another extreme star in the vicinity of Stephenson 2, IRAS 18357-0604. Both are possible post-red supergiant stars, and both of them are comparable to the yellow hypergiant IRC +10420.

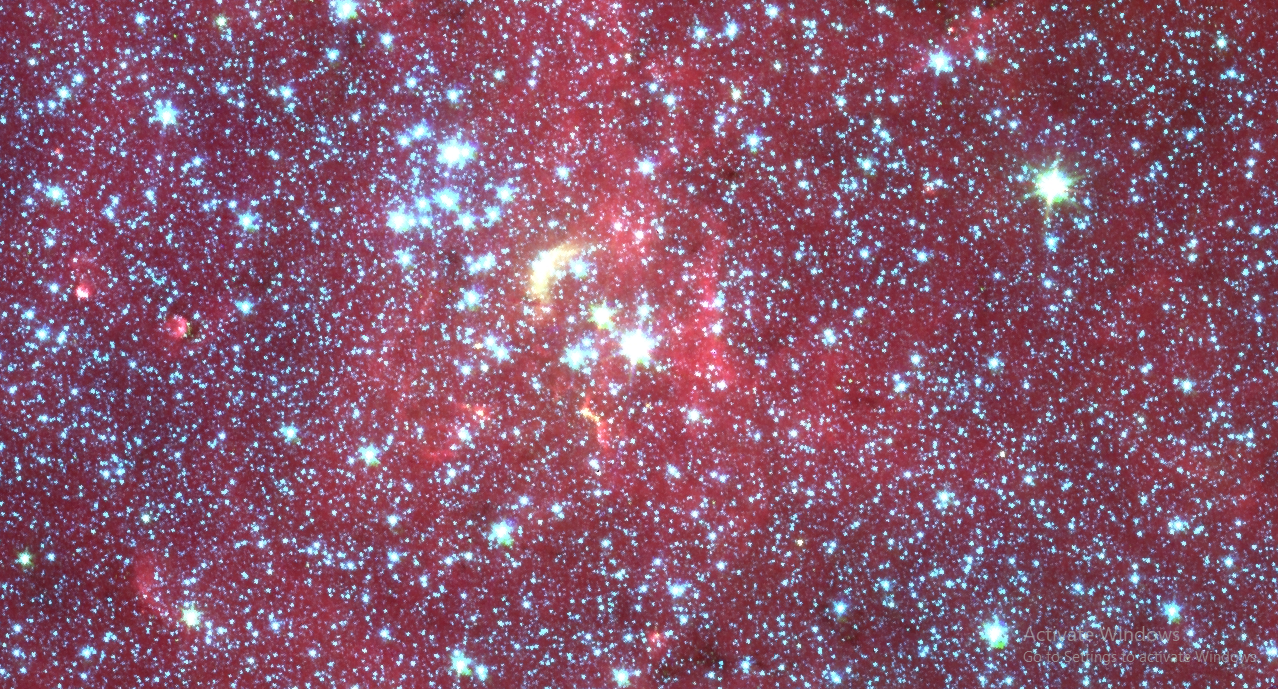
Spitzer image centred on Stephenson 2-SW, with the main cluster towards upper left. The bow-shock feature centered on St2 DFK 49 (seen as a bright yellowish arc) is readily apparent.

=== Luminosity ===
In 2007, a study of the red supergiants in Stephenson 2 estimated its properties and determined a bolometric luminosity of 245,000 L_{☉}. A 2012 study estimated and published the properties of numerous red supergiants and other supergiant stars. The study estimated Stephenson 2-11's luminosity at a much lower 132,000 L_{☉}, using spectral energy distribution (SED). Using the SED, Humphreys et al. (2020) estimates a luminosity of 390,000 L_{☉}. However, it is noted that the estimated luminosity may be an underestimate because it does not include excess radiation from warm dust. In 2026, Siebert et al. measured a much lower luminosity of 15,000 L_{☉} by modelling the SED with newer measurements encompassing far-infrared and millimeter wavelengths, in particular, a feature predicted for the previous luminosities at such wavelengths was not identified.

=== Temperature and spectrum ===
Davies (2007) estimated its temperature of 3,920 K, with an uncertainty in the measurement of ± 112 K. Five years later, Fok (2012) estimated a slightly cooler temperature at 3,700 K. A more recent study estimated the star's temperature at a hotter 4,000 K, based on its spectral type of K4. This was adopted in Siebert et al. (2026).

=== Size ===
Davies (2007) estimates a temperature of 3,920 K, with a luminosity of 245,000 L_{☉}. Applying the Stefan–Boltzmann law, Stephenson 2 DFK 49’s radius would be 1,074 solar radii (747,000,000 kilometres; 4.99 astronomical units), making it one of the largest stars known. A 2012 study published the estimated properties of numerous red supergiants and other supergiant stars using Spectral Energy Distributions, including Stephenson 2 DFK 49. The study estimates its temperature at a slightly cooler 3,700 K but its luminosity at a much lower 132,000 L_{☉}. This would imply a radius of only 884 solar radii (615,000,000 kilometres; 4.11 astronomical units), smaller than the radius implied by Davies (2007). Humphreys (2020) estimates Stephenson 2 DFK 49's temperature at 4,000 K, but a higher luminosity of 390,000 L_{☉}. Applying the Stefan–Boltzmann law, its radius would be 1,300 solar radii (900,000,000 kilometres; 6.0 astronomical units), larger than the other two estimates. Using the temperature of 4,000 K and a luminosity of 15,000 L_{☉} in Siebert et al. (2026), a much lower radius of 255 ± 43 R_{☉} (177,000,000 ± 30,000,000 kilometres; 1.19 ± 0.20 astronomical units) is obtained.

=== Mass loss and maser emissions ===
While Davies (2007) does not estimate a mass loss rate for Stephenson 2 DFK 49, the study mentions that it would be interesting to estimate its mass loss rate. In 2012, it was noted for having maser emissions at certain spectral lines. A 2020 study later determines a mass loss rate of (1.3–7)×10^{−4} M_{☉} per year based on several computer models, but it is noted that these rates are not high for other hypergiant stars such as VY Canis Majoris, NML Cygni, and IRC +10420. As a possible post-red supergiant star, Stephenson 2 DFK 49 likely experiences both constant and variable mass-loss rates.

== See also ==
- HR 5171, a multiple star system containing another large and luminous yellow hypergiant star
- IRAS 17163−3907, a pre-LBV yellow hypergiant with two visible dusty shells
- RSGC1-F15, another yellow hypergiant within another massive open cluster, RSGC1
- RW Cephei, a K-type red or yellow hypergiant that underwent a "great dimming" event similar to Betelgeuse
- V915 Scorpii, another K-type hypergiant
