= RSGC1-F01 =

Red supergiant star within open cluster RSGC1

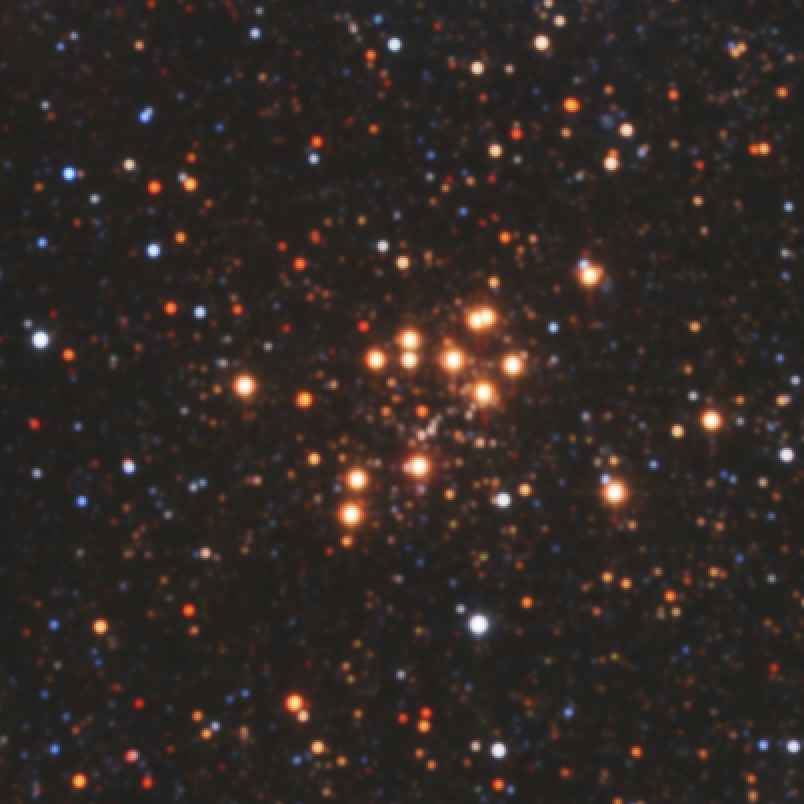
- RSGC1-F01 (circled in red) located near the center of the RSGC1 cluster

Observation data Epoch J2000 Equinox J2000
- Constellation: Scutum
- Right ascension: 18^{h} 37^{m} 56.31^{s}
- Declination: −06° 52′ 32.2″

Characteristics
- Evolutionary stage: Red supergiant
- Spectral type: M3I / M5
- Apparent magnitude (J): 9.748
- Apparent magnitude (H): 6.587

Astrometry
Radial velocity (R_{v})	107.2 km/s
Proper motion (μ)	RA: −4.569 mas/yr Dec.: −5.074 mas/yr
Parallax (π)	0.9176±0.5816 mas
Distance	22,000±2,900 ly

Details
Mass	~25 (initial) M_{☉}
Radius	1,470+220 −260 (Note: Calculated, using the Stefan-Boltzmann law and the star's effective temperature and luminosity, with respect to the solar nominal effective temperature of 5,772 K: $$\sqrt{\biggl(\frac{5,772}{3,500}\biggr)^4 \cdot 293,000} = 1,470\ R_\odot.$$) R_{☉}
Luminosity	292,000±93,000 L_{☉}
Temperature	3,500 K

Other designations
- RSGC1-F01, [FMR2006] 1, TIC 6841341, 2MASS J18375629-0652322

Database references
SIMBAD	data

RSGC1-F01 (abbreviated to F01) is a red supergiant star in the young open cluster RSGC1 located in the constellation of Scutum. It is one of the largest stars discovered so far and also one of the most luminous cool supergiants, with a radius of around 1,470 solar radii (1.02×10^{9} km; 6.8 au) and around 300,000 solar luminosities, with the former corresponding to a volume 3.18 billion times bigger than the Sun. If placed at the center of the Solar System, the photosphere would engulf the orbit of Jupiter.

The star is heavily obscured by interstellar dust and is invisible in optical wavelengths; it has only been studied through infrared and submillimeter observations. RSGC1 itself was discovered in 2006 using data from infrared surveys.

== Observation ==
RSGC1-F01 is a member of the open cluster RSGC1, which is estimated to be 10–14 million years old with a total mass of about 30,000 solar masses (M_{☉}). All red supergiants in RSGC1 share similar initial masses (around 25 M_{☉}), making the cluster a valuable for studying the evolution and mass loss of massive stars.

ALMA observations in 2024 detected CO rotational line emission from RSGC1-F01 and several other cluster members, allowing direct measurement of gas mass-loss rates and wind velocities. The wind speed for RSGC1-F01 (along with F02, F03, and F04) is 11±3 km/s. These data have contributed to a new mass-loss rate prescription for M-type supergiants with effective temperatures between roughly 3,200 and 3,800 K, showing that CO-derived rates are systematically lower than dust-based estimates.

Infrared image of RSGC1 cluster by Spitzer, with 2MASS image inset

A CO line map of RSGC1-F01 as viewed by the ALMA

== See also ==
- Mu Cephei
- NML Cygni
- Stephenson 2 DFK 1 – mistakenly referred to as "RSGC1-01" in a 2020 paper
- VY Canis Majoris
