= Stephenson 2 DFK 1 =

Star in the constellation Scutum

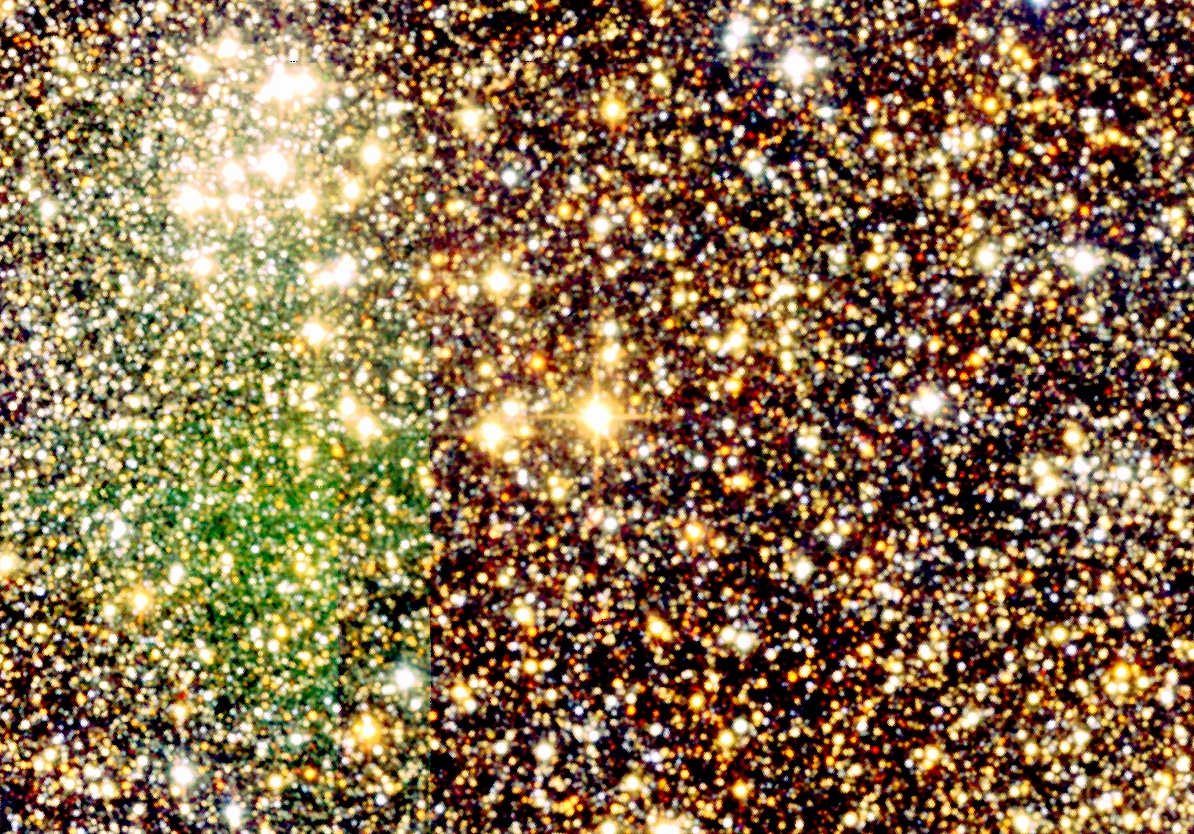
- Stephenson 2 DFK 1 (center) together with its parent cluster Stephenson 2 (upper left), viewed by the Two-Micron All Sky Survey; Credit: Université de Strasbourg/CNRS (2003)

Observation data Epoch J2000 Equinox J2000
- Constellation: Scutum
- Right ascension: 18^{h} 39^{m} 02.3709^{s}
- Declination: −06° 05′ 10.5357″

Characteristics
- Evolutionary stage: Red supergiant, possible extreme red hypergiant
- Spectral type: M5–6
- Apparent magnitude (G): 15.2631±0.0092
- Apparent magnitude (J): 7.150
- Apparent magnitude (H): 4.698
- Apparent magnitude (K): 2.9

Astrometry
Radial velocity (R_{v})	+89 km/s
Proper motion (μ)	RA: −3.045±0.511 mas/yr Dec.: −5.950±0.480 mas/yr
Distance	18,900 ± 3,300 ly (5,800±1,000 pc)

Details
Radius	1,840+310 −360 (Note: Calculated, using the Stefan-Boltzmann law and the star's effective temperature and luminosity, with respect to the solar nominal effective temperature of 5,772 K: $$\sqrt{\biggl(\frac{5,772}{3,200}\biggr)^4 \cdot 321,000} = 1,840\ R_\odot.$$) R_{☉}
Luminosity	321,000±115,000 L_{☉}
Temperature	3,200 K

Other designations
- Stephenson 2 DFK 1, St2-18, MSX6C G026.1044−00.0283, IRAS 18363−0607, 2MASS J18390238−0605106, DENIS J183902.4−060510

Database references
SIMBAD	data

Stephenson 2 DFK 1 (Note: (abbreviated to D1 or DFK 1), also known as RSGC2-01 (mistakenly referred to as RSGC1-01) or St2-18 or better known as Stephenson 2-18,) is a red supergiant (RSG) or possible extreme red hypergiant (RHG) star in the constellation of Scutum. It lies near the open cluster Stephenson 2, which is located about 5.8 kiloparsecs (19,000 light-years) away from Earth in the Scutum–Centaurus Arm of the Milky Way galaxy. Although older studies have categorised it as an unrelated or foreground red supergiant, it is now generally accepted to be a member of its cluster.

At a radius of roughly 1,840 times that of the Sun (R_{☉}), corresponding to a volume around 6.26 billion times that of the Sun, it is one of the largest known stars. If placed at the center of the Solar System, its photosphere would extend past the orbit of Jupiter and almost reach the orbit of Saturn. It is also one of the most luminous and coolest red supergiants known, with a luminosity 321,000 times that of the Sun (L_{☉}) and an effective temperature of 3,200 K respectively.

== Observation history ==
Stephenson 2 DFK 1 was first catalogued in 1988. It was given the designation IRAS 18363-0607 in the IRAS Point Source Catalog.

The open cluster Stephenson 2 was discovered by American astronomer Charles Bruce Stephenson in 1990 in the data obtained by a deep infrared survey. The cluster is also known as RSGC2, one of several massive open clusters in Scutum, each containing multiple red supergiants.

The brightest star in the region of the cluster was given the identifier 1 in the first analysis of cluster member properties. However, it was not considered to be a member of Stephenson 2 due to its outlying position, abnormally high brightness, and slightly atypical proper motion, instead being categorized as an unrelated red supergiant.

In a later study, the same star was given the number 18 and assigned to an outlying group of stars called Stephenson 2 SW, assumed to be at a similar distance to the core cluster. The designation St2-18 (short for Stephenson 2-18) is often used for the star, following the numbering from Deguchi (2010). To avoid confusion from using the same number for different stars and different numbers for the same star, designations from Davies (2007) are often given a prefix of DFK or D, for example Stephenson 2 DFK 1 or simply D1 where the context is clear.

In 2012, Stephenson 2 DFK 1, along with 56 other red supergiants, was observed in a study regarding the maser emissions from red supergiants across the galaxy. The study derived the properties of those red supergiants using the Australia Telescope Compact Array (ATCA) and the DUSTY model. Stephenson 2 DFK 1 was among the red supergiants mentioned. That same year, it was observed again for a study regarding the types of masers on red supergiant stars in clusters. During 2013, in a study regarding the red supergiants in Stephenson 2, Stephenson 2 DFK 1 (referred to as D1) was observed. In several later studies, the star was described as being a "very late-type red supergiant."

It was also noted in Humphreys et al. (2020), albeit mistakenly referred to as RSGC1-01, another very large and luminous red supergiant in the same constellation of Scutum and as well as part of another open cluster, RSGC1.

== Distance ==
Zoomed in image of Stephenson 2 DFK 1

When the cluster was originally discovered in 1990, Stephenson 2, and therefore Stephenson 2 DFK 1, was originally estimated to have a distance of around 30 kiloparsecs (98,000 light-years), much farther than the cluster is thought to reside today.

A study in 2007 determined a kinematic distance of 5.83+1.91
−0.78 kiloparsecs (19,000+6,200
−2,500 light-years) from comparison with the cluster's radial velocity, considerably closer than the original distance quoted by Stephenson (1990). However, because of Stephenson 2 DFK 1's doubtful membership, its distance was not directly estimated. This value was later adopted in a recent study of the cluster.

A similar kinematic distance of 5.5 kiloparsecs (18,000 light-years) was reported in a 2010 study, derived from the average radial velocity of four of the cluster's members (96 kilometers per second) and from an association with a clump of stars near Stephenson 2, Stephenson 2 SW, locating it near the Scutum–Centaurus Arm of the Milky Way. This value was later adopted in a 2012 study to calculate the star's luminosity. It is noted that the uncertainty in the distance was greater than 50%. Despite this, it is also stated that distances to massive star clusters will be improved in the future.

Verheyen et al. (2013) used the average radial velocity of the cluster (+109.3±0.7 kilometers per second) to derive a kinematic distance of roughly six kiloparsecs (20,000 light-years) for the cluster. However, Stephenson 2 DFK 1's radial velocity is calculated to be only 89 kilometers per second and therefore leading to the study's statement that the star is a field red supergiant unassociated with the cluster.

=== Membership ===
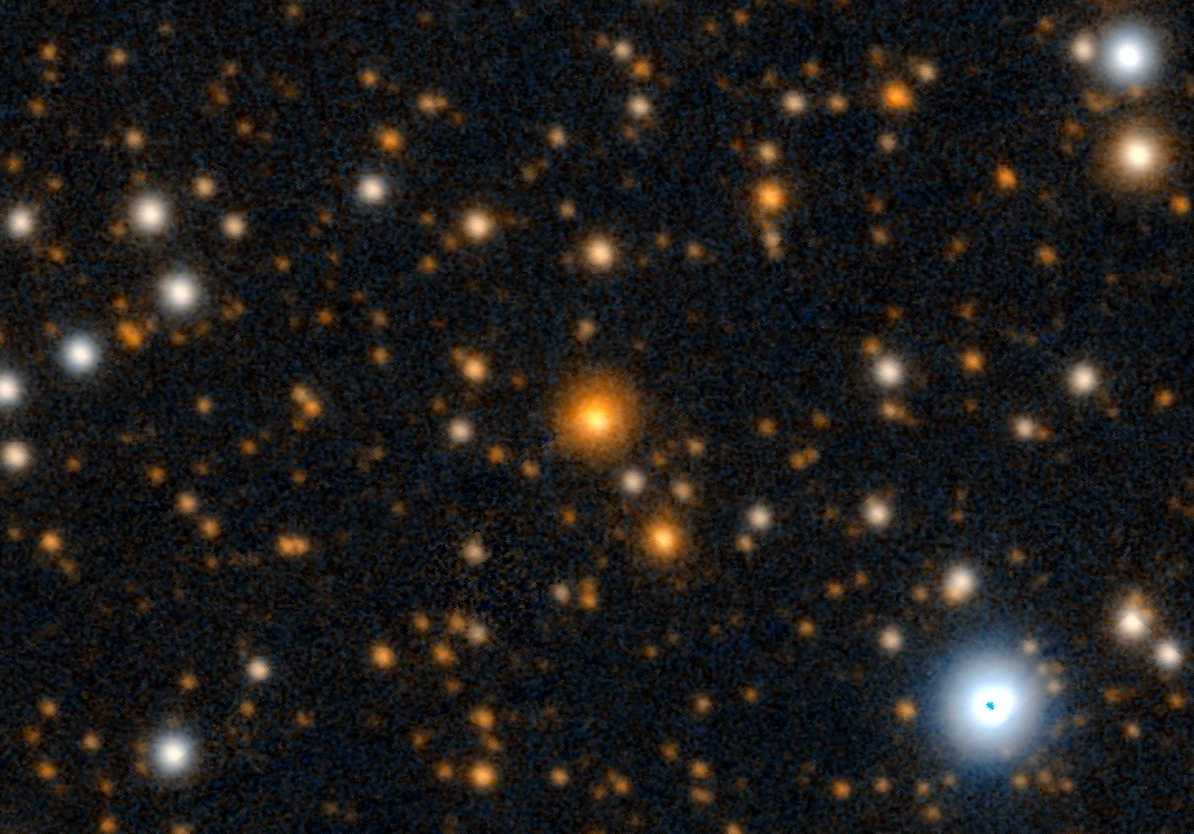
Stephenson 2 DFK 1 seen by Pan-STARRS DR1

It has been debated for a while whether this star is actually part of its supposed cluster. Due to its radial velocity being below that of the other cluster stars but with some signs of membership, some sources state that the star is unlikely to be a foreground giant; However, more recent papers considered the star an unlikely member due to its extreme and inconsistent properties.

Using radial velocities determined from silicon oxide (SiO) maser emission and IR CO absorption, a study of red supergiant masers in massive clusters considered Stephenson 2 DFK 1 as a field red supergiant, unrelated to Stephenson 2. This is due to its lower radial velocity, which is significantly different compared to other stars from Stephenson 2.

Another possibility is that Stephenson 2 DFK 1 is actually a member, because its radial velocity is offset by an expanding optically thick envelope. The velocity difference between this star’s radial velocity and Stephenson 2 itself (20 kilometers per second) is a typical outflow speed for red supergiants. One study suggests that Stephenson 2 DFK 1 is part of a cluster related to Stephenson 2, Stephenson 2 SW, which is assumed to be at the same distance as the core cluster itself. This proposed cluster contains several other massive stars and red supergiants, including Stephenson 2 DFK 49.

== Physical properties ==
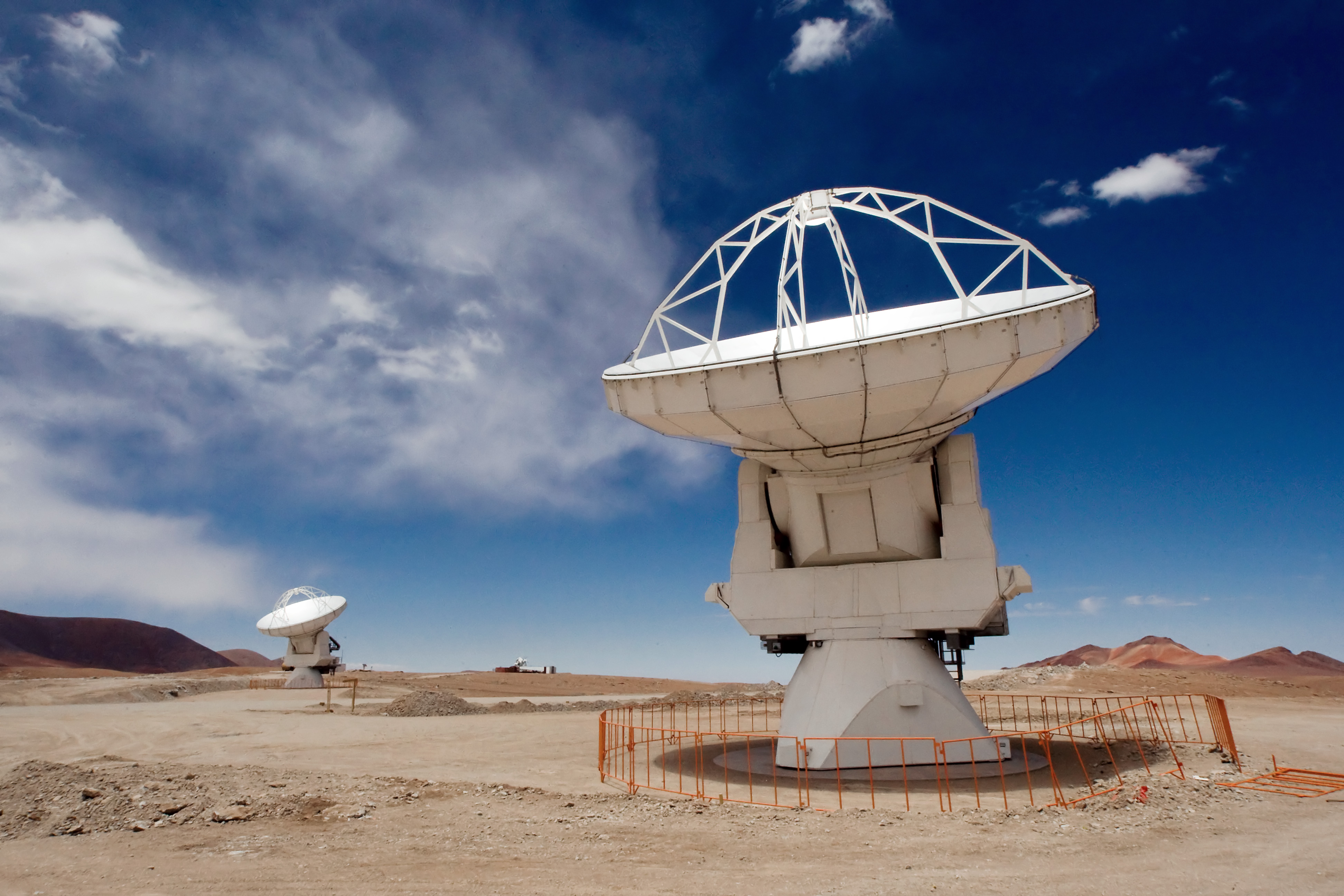
The Atacama Large Millimeter/submillimeter Array was used to derive Stephenson 2 DFK 1's bolometric luminosity and effective temperature estimates.

Stephenson 2 DFK 1 is usually classified as a red supergiant, like the other stars in the cluster. However, certain enigmatic properties, such as the star's significant infrared excess, suggest it might be an extreme red hypergiant, much like VY Canis Majoris. The star is estimated to have a mass-loss rate of roughly 1.35×10^{−5} M_{☉} per year, which is among the highest known for any red supergiant star. It may have recently undergone an extreme mass-loss episode due to its significant infrared excess. It is also stated that the star is on the brink of ejecting its outer layers and evolving into a luminous blue variable (LBV) or Wolf–Rayet star (WR star).

An article describing the red supergiants in Stephenson 2 stated that Stephenson 2 DFK 1 (referred to as D1) and D2 (another member of Stephenson 2) have maser emissions, indicating that they have the highest mass loss in the cluster. Only the stars with the highest bolometric luminosities in the cluster seem to present maser emissions. Stephenson 2 DFK 1 displays strong silicate emission, especially at wavelengths of 10 μm and 18 μm. Water masers were detected in the star as well.

Stephenson 2 DFK 1 compared to the Sun

Stephenson 2 DFK 1's spectral type has been estimated to be between M5 and around M6, unusual and very late for even a red supergiant star, both based on its CO-bandhead absorption, along with also on its spectrum and the characteristics of certain spectral features for the latter, such as titanium oxide (TiO) spectral lines.

=== Luminosity, temperature and size ===
The first calculation of the star's bolometric luminosity was published in 2010. It assumes membership of the Stephenson 2 cluster at 5.5 kpc and it is based on 12 and 25 μm flux densities, giving a relatively modest luminosity of 90,000 L_{☉}. Because it relies on a narrow range of fluxes, it is likely to be an underestimate.

In 2013, the Australia Telescope Compact Array was used to determine the parameters of a selected number of red supergiants (including several Stephenson 2 members) by fitting their Spectral Energy Distribution (SED) with the DUSTY model. It gave the star a very high luminosity of nearly 440,000 L_{☉} based on the same distance and also an effective temperature of 3,200 K. Under the Stefan–Boltzmann law, this corresponds to a very large radius of 2,150 R_{☉} (1.50×10^{9} km; 10.0 au; 930,000,000 mi), leading to a volume around 10 billion times bigger than the Sun. (Note: Calculated, using the Stefan-Boltzmann law and the star's effective temperature and luminosity, with respect to the solar nominal effective temperature of 5,772 K: $$\sqrt{\biggl(\frac{5,772}{3,200}\biggr)^4 \cdot 10^{5.64}} = 2,150\ R_\odot.$$) This would make Stephenson 2 DFK 1 the largest and most luminous of all selected red supergiants in the sample, second only after Westerlund 1 W26. For comparison, Saturn orbits the Sun at a distance of 9.59 au (1.435×10^{9} km; 891,000,000 mi).

==== Extreme properties ====
Stephenson 2 DFK 1's luminosity, temperature and size estimates from 2013, along with the star's late spectral type, would make it considerably cooler, more luminous and thus larger than theoretical models of the most luminous, coolest, and thus largest red supergiants within the Hayashi line predicted by stellar evolutionary theory at least maintening hydrostatic equilibrium per the Hayashi limit and the Humphreys–Davidson limit (typically roughly 1,500 R_{☉}, 3,500 K, and 320,000 L_{☉}). As such, the star would not be in hydrostatic equilibrium, likely experiencing a significant level of instability, such as violent levels of mass-loss (as evidenced by its significant infrared excess) and spectral variability, similar to VX Sagittarii and Westerlund 1 W26. However, the publication notes that the uncertainty in the cluster's distance could be as high as 50%, resulting into similar uncertainty for the stellar radius and even higher for the luminosity. Aditionally, the star's doubtful membership, uncertain distance and differing radial velocities compared to the rest of the stars in Stephenson 2 have led to some authors to consider the star as a red supergiant unrelated to Stephenson 2 or any of the red supergiant clusters at the base of the Scutum–Centaurus Arm. As stated in a 2012 study, the stellar association is spread over a large area, with Stephenson 2 blending into its immediate surroundings.

==== Newer publications ====
CO line emission map of Stephenson 2 DFK 1, viewed by ALMA

A 2020 calculation of Stephenson 2 DFK 1's bolometric luminosity, based on Spectral energy distribution (SED) integration, using published fluxes and a distance of 5.8 kpc, yields an even higher estimate of 630,000 L_{☉}. It has been noted that the star's SED is peculiar and cannot be fitted to standard reddening laws. This would imply that the star has higher extinction and that it is actually more luminous, casting doubt on its membership.

On the other hand, a 2026 study, using spectral energy distribution (SED) modelling and a cluster distance of 5.8±1.0 kpc, revised the luminosity to a lower value of 321,000±115,000 L_{☉}, closer to the Humphreys–Davidson luminosity limit of 320,000 L_{☉}. At an effective temperature of 3,200 K, a lower radius of 1,840 R_{☉} (1.28×10^{9} km; 8.6 au; 0.80×10^{9} mi) is obtained using the Stefan–Boltzmann law. The authors note that none of their models satisfactorily reproduce the spectrum towards DFK 1 across multiple apertures. This could indicate that the star is at a different distance from the cluster, but adopting distances as low as 4 kpc does not resolve this issue, thus reducing evidence for a lower distance.

Other effective temperature estimates of 3,463 K and 3,006 K have been calculated in 2025 and 2024 respectively.

== See also ==
- R136a1 – One of the most massive and luminous stars known
- List of most massive stars
- Westerlund 1 W237 – Another luminous red supergiant part of Westerlund 1 once considered to be a possible foreground giant
- NML Cygni
- WOH G64
- RSGC1-F13 – A red hypergiant that may also challenge the Humphreys–Davidson limit
- UY Scuti
- MY Cephei
