= Stephenson 2 =

Massive open cluster in the constellation Scutum

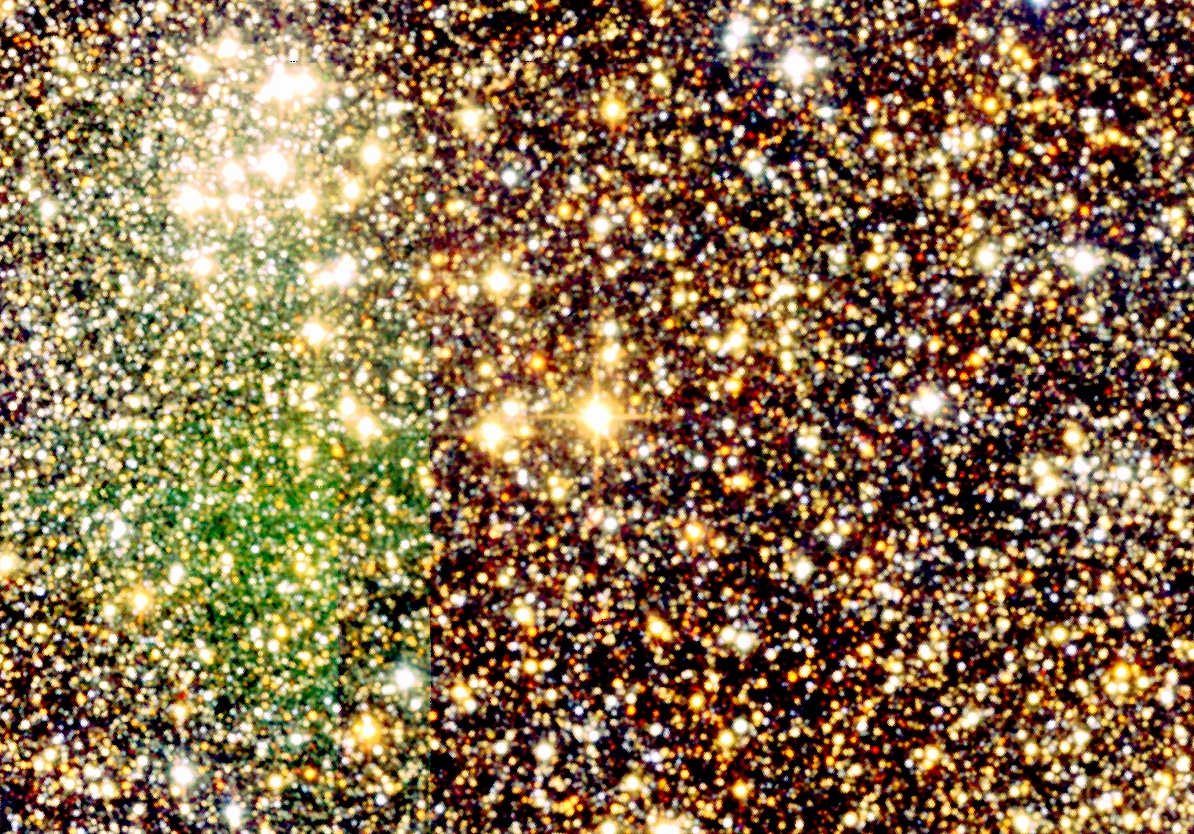
- 2MASS image of Stephenson 2 as the cluster of stars in the upper left, with Stephenson 2 DFK 1 at the center. Credit: Université de Strasbourg/CNRS (2003)

Observation data (J2000 epoch)
- Right ascension: 18^{h} 39^{m} 21.12^{s}
- Declination: −06° 01′ 44.4″
- Distance: (5.83+1.91 −0.78 kpc)
- Apparent magnitude (V): not visible
- Apparent dimensions (V): 1.8'

Physical characteristics
- Mass: (3–5)×10^{4} M_{☉}
- Radius: ~4 pc
- Estimated age: 14–20 My
- Other designations: RSGC2

Associations
- Scutum

Stephenson 2, also known as RSGC2 (Red Supergiant Cluster 2), is a young massive open cluster belonging to the Milky Way galaxy. It was discovered in 1990 as a cluster of red supergiants in a photographic, deep infrared survey by the astronomer Charles Bruce Stephenson, after whom the cluster is named. It is located in the constellation Scutum at the distance of about 6 kpc from the Sun. It is likely situated at the intersection of the northern end of the Long Bar of the Milky Way and the inner portion of the Scutum–Centaurus Arm—one of the two major spiral arms.

== Observation history ==
=== Distance estimates ===
When the cluster was originally discovered in 1990, Stephenson 2 was originally estimated to have a distance of around 30 kiloparsecs (98,000 light-years), much further than the cluster is thought to reside today. This greater distance was calculated by the assumption that the cluster stars were all M-type supergiants, then calculating the distance modulus based on their typical absolute magnitudes.

In 2001, Nakaya et al. estimated the distance of the stars in the cluster to be 1.5 kiloparsecs (4,900 light-years), which is significantly closer than any other distance estimate given for the star and the cluster. Alternatively, a study around a similar timeframe gave a further distance of roughly 5.9 kiloparsecs (19,000 light-years). A study in 2007 determined a kinematic distance of 5.83+1.91
−0.78 kiloparsecs (19000+6200
−2500 light-years) from comparison with the cluster's radial velocity, considerably closer than the original distance of 30 kiloparsecs (98,000 light-years) quoted by Stephenson (1990). This value was later adopted in a recent study of the cluster.

A similar kinematic distance of 5.5 kiloparsecs (18,000 light-years) was reported in a 2010 study, derived from the average radial velocity of four of the cluster's members (96 kilometers per second) and from an association with a clump of stars near Stephenson 2, Stephenson 2 SW, locating it near the Scutum–Centaurus Arm of the Milky Way. This value was later adopted in a 2012 study, which used the aforementioned distance to calculate the luminosities of the members, however it is noted that the uncertainty in the distance was greater than 50%. Despite this, it is also stated that distances to massive star clusters will be improved in the future. Verheyen et al. (2013) used the average radial velocity of the cluster (+109.3±0.7 kilometers per second) to derive a kinematic distance of roughly 6 kiloparsecs (20,000 light-years) for the cluster.

== Description ==
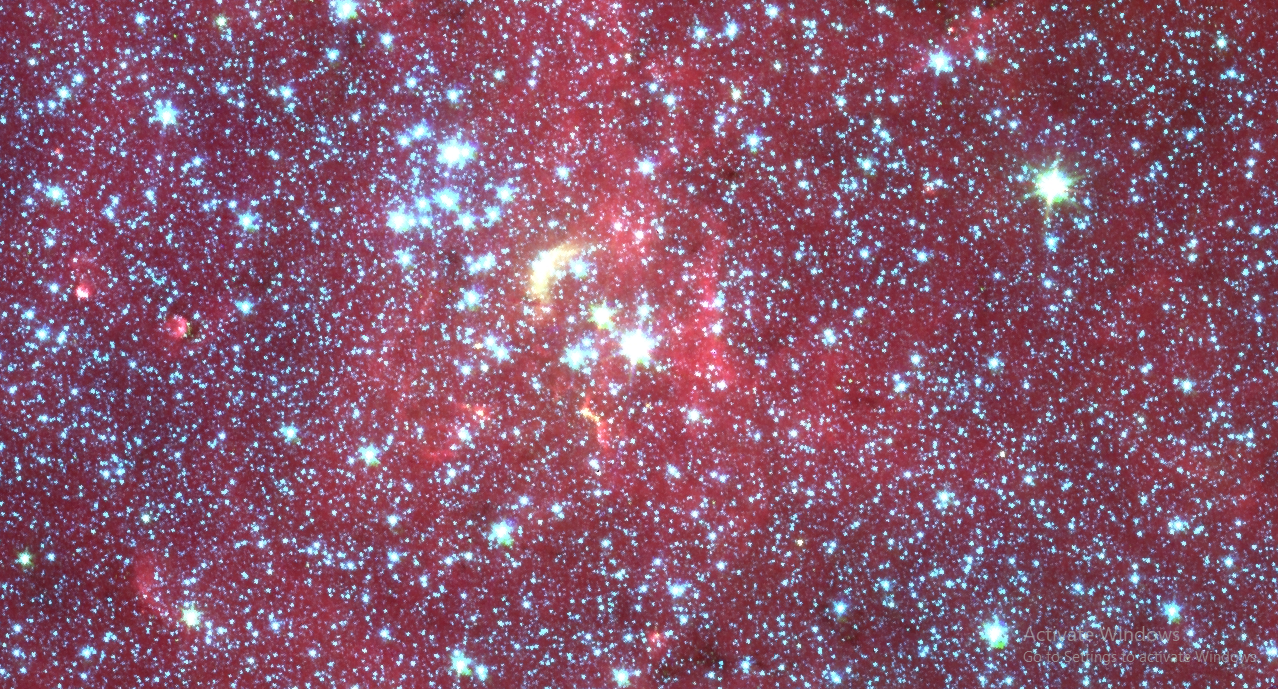
Spitzer image centred on Stephenson 2 SW, with the main cluster towards upper left

26 red supergiants have been confirmed as members of the cluster, far more than any other known cluster, both in and out of the Milky Way. This includes stars such as Stephenson 2 DFK 1, Stephenson 2 DFK 2, and Stephenson 2 DFK 49. A more recent study has identified around 80 red supergiants in the line of sight of Stephenson 2, approximately 40 of them with radial velocities consistent with being cluster members. However these stars are spread over a wider area than a typical cluster, indicating an extended stellar association similar to that found around the nearby cluster RSGC3.

The age of Stephenson 2 is estimated at 14–20 million years. The observed red supergiants with the mass of about 12–16 solar masses are type II supernova progenitors. The cluster is heavily obscured and has not been detected in the visible light. It lies close to other groupings of red supergiants known as RSGC1, RSGC3, Alicante 7, Alicante 8, and Alicante 10. The mass of the open cluster is estimated at 30–50 thousand solar masses, which makes it the second most massive open cluster in the Galaxy.

== Stephenson 2 SW ==
Some of the stars in the vicinity of the cluster lie in a loose grouping near the cluster, including Stephenson 2 DFK 1, Stephenson 2 DFK 49 and Stephenson 2-26. This grouping was first mentioned in Deguchi (2010) and was named Stephenson 2 SW because it lies south-west of the main cluster. While the radial velocities of its members are somewhat different from the main cluster's radial velocity, by about 7.7 km/s. The difference between the two velocities is still relatively small, and not enough to rule out its association with the main cluster. Thus, it was assumed that it is possibly related to Stephenson 2 itself.

== Members ==
Stars whose rows are colored in yellow are stars supposed to be part of Stephenson 2 SW.

Member stars of Stephenson 2 cluster
DFK # (Note: Reference for values is Davies et al. (2007), unless otherwise noted.)	Spectral type	Magnitude (K band)	Temperature (effective, K)	Abs. mag. (K band)	Luminosity (L_{☉})	Radius (R_{☉})
1 (Note: This star is thought to be a part of Stephenson 2 SW.)	M5–6	2.900	3,200		321,000	1,840
2	M3/M7	4.120	3,200	−11.12	160,000	1,301
3	M4	4.499	3,535–3,400	−10.72	88,000–110,000	854–883
5	M4	4.822	3,400–3,535	−11.02	100,000–145,000	911–1,014
6	M5	5.072	3,450–3,600	−9.95	50,100–53,000	591–627
8	K5	5.106	3,840–3,900	−10.23	84,000–87,100	635–667
9	M5	5.233	3,450	−10.28	69,200	736
10	M5	5.244	3,450–3,500	−10.03	53,700–72,000	649–730
11	M4	5.256	3,535–3,600	−10.08	41,700–49,000	551–569
13	M4	5.439	3,535–3,700	−9.85	47,000–49,000	499–590
14	M3	5.443	3,600–3,605	−9.77	27,000–47,900	422–561
15	M2	5.513	3,660–3,700	−9.59	14,000–42,700	287–514
16	M3	5.597	3,605	−9.50	37,200	494
17	K3	5.619	4,000–4,015	−9.99	47,000–79,400	451–582
18	M4	5.632	3,535–3,800	−9.36	31,600–53,000	474–531
19	M3	5.801	3,605	−9.17	27,500	425
20	M2	5.805	3,660	−9.32	33,100	453
21	M2	5.824	3,660	−9.81	51,300	563
23	M4	5.840	3,500–3,535	−10.35	59,000–77,600	661–743
26	M3	6.003	3,605	−9.16	27,500	425
27	M2	6.130	3,660	−9.19	29,500	427
29	M0	6.146	3,790	−8.86	24,000	359
30	M1	6.200	3,745	−8.82	22,400	355
31	M1	6.244	3,745	−9.24	32,400	427
49	K4	7.324	3,920–4,000		15,000	255
52	M0	7.419	3,790–3,800	−8.72	20,900–24,000	335–357
72	M0	7.920	3,790	−8.62	19,000	320

== See also ==
- Delta Lyrae cluster (Stephenson 1)
