= Alicante 8 =

Group of stars in the constellation Scutum

Observation data (J2000 epoch)
- Right ascension: 18^{h} 34^{m} 00^{s}
- Declination: −07° 14′ 00″
- Distance: ~20 kly (~6–7 kpc)
- Apparent magnitude (V): not visible
- Apparent dimensions (V): <7′

Physical characteristics
- Mass: 1–2 × 10^{4} M_{☉}
- Radius: ~6 pc
- Estimated age: 16–20 Myr
- Other designations: RSGC4

Associations
- Constellation: Scutum

Alicante 8, also known as RSGC4, (Red Supergiant Cluster 4) is an asterism, formerly thought to be a young massive open cluster, belonging to the Milky Way galaxy. It was discovered in 2010 in the 2MASS survey data. As of 2010, the only members of the cluster that were identified are 8–13 red supergiants—young massive stars undergoing helium burning in their cores. The cluster is located in the constellation Scutum at a distance of about 20–23 kly (6–7 kpc) from the Sun. It is likely situated at the intersection of the northern end of the Long Bar of the Milky Way and the inner portion of the Scutum–Centaurus Arm—one of the two major spiral arms.

The age of Alicante 8 is estimated to be around 16–20 million years. The observed red supergiants are type II supernova progenitors. The cluster is heavily obscured and has not been detected in the visible light. It lies close to other groupings of red supergiants known as RSGC1, Stephenson 2, RSGC3, Alicante 7, and Alicante 10. The mass of the open cluster is estimated at 10–20 thousand solar masses, which makes it one of the most massive open clusters in the Galaxy.

A 2023 study of the radial velocities of the stars of Alicante 8 showed that they vary widely, instead of being similar as would be expected for a gravitationally bound star cluster. This study also found that some of the stars may not be red supergiants, but asymptotic giant branch stars.
