= RSGC3 =

Massive open cluster rich in red supergiants in the constellation Scutum

Observation data (J2000 epoch)
- Right ascension: 18^{h} 45^{m} 24.0^{s}
- Declination: −03° 23′ 13″
- Distance: 22+12 −8 kly (7.0+3.7 −2.4 kpc)
- Apparent magnitude (V): not visible
- Apparent dimensions (V): 1.8′

Physical characteristics
- Mass: ~2×10^{4} M_{☉}
- Radius: ~2 pc
- Estimated age: 18–24 Myr

Associations
- Constellation: Scutum

RSGC3 (Red Supergiant Cluster 3) is a young massive open cluster belonging to the Milky Way galaxy. It was discovered in 2010 in the GLIMPSE survey data. The cluster is located in the constellation Scutum at the distance of about 7 kpc from the Sun. It is likely situated at the intersection of the northern end of the Long Bar of the Milky Way and the inner portion of the Scutum–Centaurus Arm—one of its two major spiral arms.

The age of RSGC3 is estimated at 18–24 million years. The 16 detected red supergiant cluster members with masses of about 12–15 M_{☉} are type II supernova progenitors. The cluster is heavily obscured and has not been detected in the visible light. It lies close to other groupings of red supergiants known as RSGC1, Stephenson 2, Alicante 7, Alicante 8, and Alicante 10. The total mass of RSGC3 is estimated at 20 thousand solar masses, which makes it one of the most massive open clusters in the Galaxy.

More work has identified a population of at least 30 additional red supergiants in the vicinity of RSGC3, 7 of which are tightly grouped and have been assumed to form a cluster named Alicante 7. The number of red supergiants identified in the several small areas studied in this region of the sky forms a significant fraction of all those known in the galaxy, suggesting very unusual properties for the region near the end of the galactic bar.

== See also ==
- List of largest known stars
