= UY Scuti =

Star in the constellation Scutum

- Pan-STARRS image of red supergiant star UY Scuti (brightest star in the image), surrounded by a dense starfield

Observation data Epoch J2000 Equinox J2000
- Constellation: Scutum
- Right ascension: 18^{h} 27^{m} 36.5334^{s}
- Declination: −12° 27′ 58.866″
- Apparent magnitude (V): 8.29 - 10.56

Characteristics
- Evolutionary stage: Extreme red supergiant or hypergiant
- Spectral type: M2-M4Ia-Iab (M4Iae)
- U−B color index: +3.29
- B−V color index: +3.00
- Variable type: SRc

Astrometry
Radial velocity (R_{v})	18.33±0.82 km/s
Proper motion (μ)	RA: 1.3 mas/yr Dec.: −1.6 mas/yr
Parallax (π)	0.5166±0.0494 mas
Distance	5,871+534 −446 ly (1,800+164 −137 pc)
Absolute magnitude (M_{V})	−6.2

Details
Radius	909 R_{☉}
Luminosity	124,000 L_{☉}
Temperature	3,550 K

Other designations
- IRC −10422, RAFGL 2162, HV 3805, UY Sct, BD−12°5055

Database references
SIMBAD	data

UY Scuti (BD-12°5055) is a red supergiant or hypergiant star, located 5,900 light-years away in the constellation Scutum. It is also a pulsating variable star, with a maximum brightness of magnitude 8.29 and a minimum of magnitude 10.56, which makes it too dim for naked-eye visibility. It is considered to be one of the largest known stars, with a radius estimated at 909 solar radii (632 million kilometres; 4.23 astronomical units), thus a volume of 750 million times that of the Sun. This estimate implies that if it were placed at the center of the Solar System, its photosphere would extend past the orbit of Mars or even the asteroid belt.

== Nomenclature and observational history ==
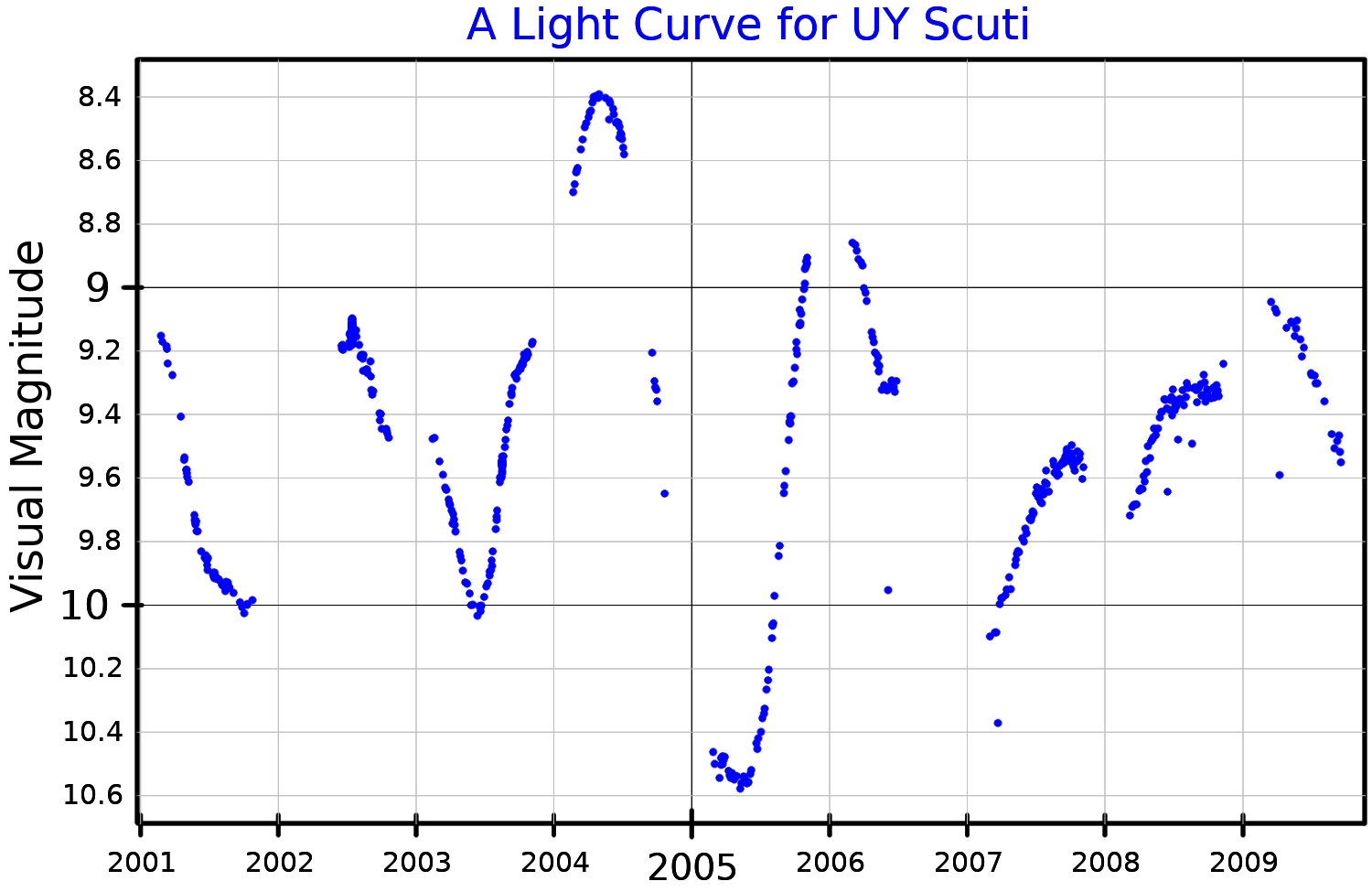
A visual band light curve for UY Scuti, plotted from ASAS data

UY Scuti was first catalogued in 1860 by German astronomers at the Bonn Observatory, who were completing a survey of stars for the Bonner Durchmusterung Stellar Catalogue. It was designated BD-12°5055, the 5,055th star between 12°S and 13°S counting from 0h right ascension.

On detection in the second survey, the star was found to have changed slightly in brightness, suggesting that it was a new variable star. In accordance with the international standard for designation of variable stars, it was called UY Scuti, denoting it as the 38th variable star of the constellation Scutum.

UY Scuti is located a few degrees north of the A-type star Gamma Scuti and northeast of the Eagle Nebula. It is also near the Scutum OB3 association, which is located between 1.33 and 2.23 kiloparsecs (kpc) away, although it is not considered to be a member. Although the star is very luminous, it is, at its brightest, only 9th magnitude as viewed from Earth, due to its distance and location in the Zone of Avoidance within the Cygnus rift.

== Characteristics ==
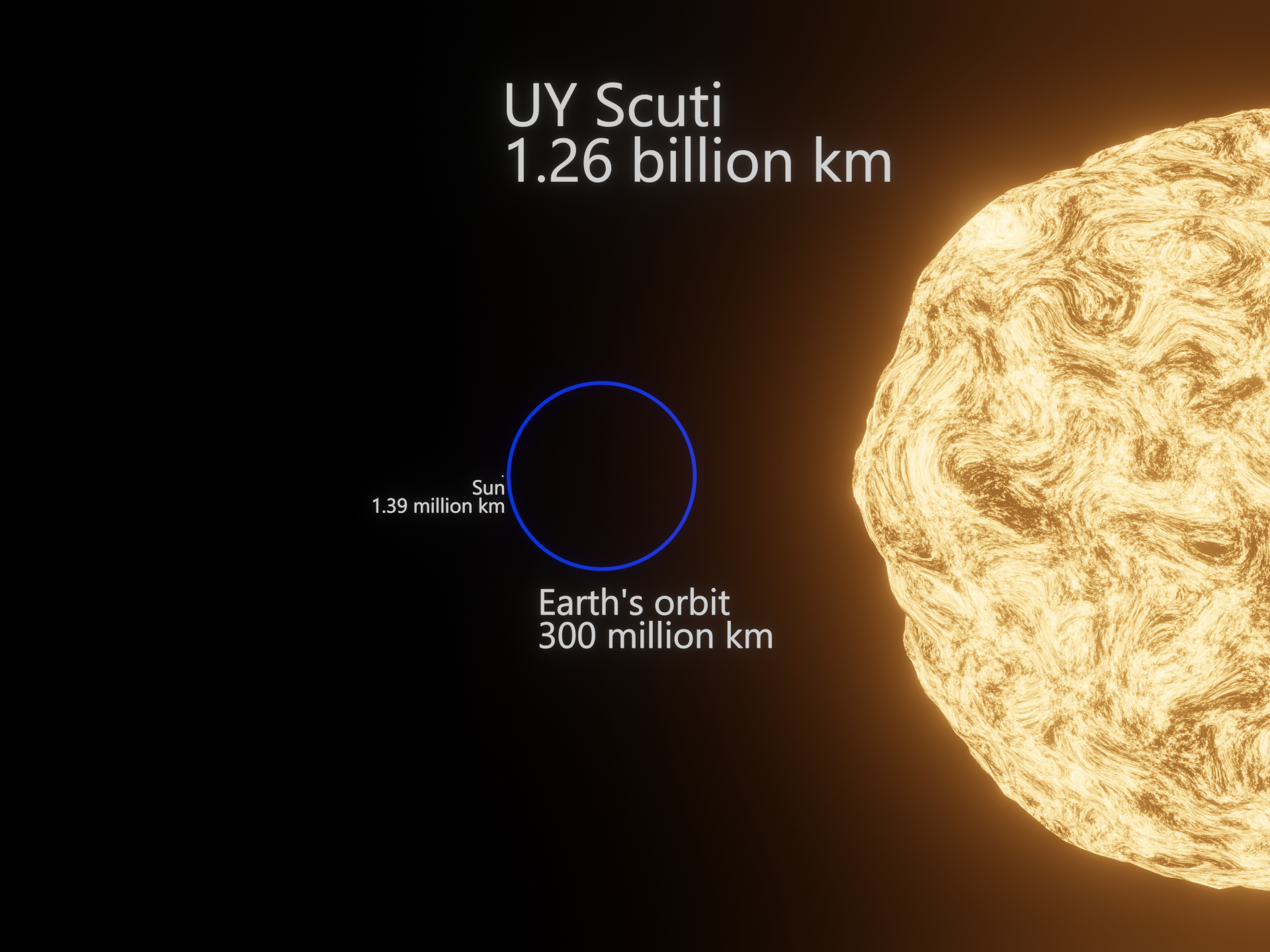
The size of UY Scuti compared to Earth's orbit and the Sun (barely visible)

UY Scuti is a dust-enshrouded bright red supergiant, losing its mass at 5.8×10^{−5} M_{☉} per year, which leads to an extensive and complex circumstellar environment of gas and dust. Sometimes described as an extreme red supergiant or hypergiant, it has been compared to another pulsating but cooler supergiant, S Persei, and is also found to be a maser source of H_{2}O, SiO, and OH masers. However, they are too weak for the star to be considered a true OH/IR supergiant, unlike VY Canis Majoris and IRC +10420. It has some emission-lines and is classified as a semiregular variable with an approximate pulsation period of 740 days. Based on an old radius of 1,708 R_{☉}, this pulsation would be an overtone of the fundamental pulsation period, or it may be a fundamental mode corresponding to a smaller radius.

The distance of UY Scuti is poorly known, but most estimates place it somewhere around 2 kpc. It has no known companion star, and so its mass is also uncertain. However, it is expected on theoretical grounds to be between 7 and 10 M_{☉}.

In mid 2012, AMBER interferometry with the Very Large Telescope (VLT) in the Atacama Desert in Chile was used to measure the parameters of three red supergiants near the Galactic Center region: UY Scuti, AH Scorpii, and KW Sagittarii. They determined that all three stars are over 1,000 times bigger than the Sun and over 100,000 times more luminous than the Sun. The stars' sizes were calculated using the Rosseland radius, the location at which the optical depth is 2/3, with distances adopted from earlier publications. UY Scuti was analyzed to be the largest, the most luminous and the coolest of the three stars measured, at 1,708 ± 192 R_{☉} (1.188×10^{9} ± 134,000,000 km; 7.94 ± 0.89 AU) based on an angular diameter of 5.48±0.10 mas and an assumed distance of 2.9±0.317 kpc (about 9,500±1,030 light-years) which was originally derived in 1970 based on the modelling of the spectrum of UY Scuti. The luminosity is then calculated to be 340,000 L_{☉} at an effective temperature of 3,365±134 K, giving an initial mass of 25 M_{☉} (possibly up to 40 M_{☉} for a non-rotating star). The calculated radius has led UY Sct to be sometimes described as the largest star known. However, potentially larger radius estimates have already been implied and published for other supergiant stars, such as VX Sagittarii, NML Cygni, MY Cephei, and Stephenson 2 DFK 1. In addition, other leading candidates have been suggested, such as frequently both VY Canis Majoris and the extragalactic WOH G64 A, which resides within the Large Magellanic Cloud.

Direct measurements of the parallax of UY Scuti published in the Gaia Data Release 2 give a parallax of 0.6433±0.1059 mas, implying a much closer distance of approximately 1.5 kiloparsecs (4,900 ly), and consequently much lower luminosity and radius values of around 86,300–87,100 L_{☉} and 755 R_{☉} respectively. However, the Gaia parallax might be unreliable due to a very high level of astrometric noise. The distance of UY Scuti has been re-measured by Bailer-Jones et al. in 2021, based on a method that uses the stellar parallax from Gaia EDR3, its color and apparent brightness, giving it a distance of 1,800 pc (5,900 ly). A 2023 measurement using photometry and the Gaia DR3 distance puts the radius at a value of 909 R_{☉}, together with a luminosity of 124,000 L_{☉} assuming an effective temperature of 3,550 K from an adopted spectral class of M3.5.

== Supernova ==
Based on current models of stellar evolution, UY Scuti has begun to fuse helium and continues to fuse hydrogen in a shell around the core. The location of UY Scuti deep within the Milky Way disc suggests that it is a metal-rich star.

After fusing heavy elements, its core will begin to produce iron, disrupting the balance of gravity and radiation in its core and resulting in a core collapse supernova. It is expected that a star like UY Scuti should evolve back to hotter temperatures to become a yellow hypergiant, luminous blue variable, or a Wolf–Rayet star, creating a strong stellar wind that will eject its outer layers and expose the core, before exploding as a type IIb, IIn, or type Ib/Ic supernova.
