= Zeta Cephei =

Star in the constellation Cepheus

- Location of ζ Cephei (circled)

Observation data Epoch J2000 Equinox J2000
- Constellation: Cepheus
- Right ascension: 22^{h} 10^{m} 51.277^{s}
- Declination: +58° 12′ 04.54″
- Apparent magnitude (V): 3.35

Characteristics
- Evolutionary stage: Red supergiant
- Spectral type: K1.5 Ib
- B−V color index: +1.55

Astrometry
Proper motion (μ)	RA: 13.359±0.148 mas/yr Dec.: 5.275±0.183 mas/yr
Parallax (π)	3.2972±0.1456 mas
Distance	992.7+51.2 −46 ly (304.5+15.7 −14.1 pc)
Absolute magnitude (M_{V})	−4.7

Details
Mass	10.1±0.1 M_{☉}
Radius	171.55±7.40 R_{☉}
Luminosity	10,024±1,052 L_{☉}
Surface gravity (log g)	0.75 cgs
Temperature	4,393±58 K
Metallicity [Fe/H]	+0.04 dex
Rotational velocity (v sin i)	10.64 km/s

Other designations
- 21 Cephei, BD+57°2475, FK5 836, HD 210745, HIP 109492, HR 8465, SAO 34137, Gaia DR2 2199493438511811712, Gaia DR3 2199493438511811712

Database references
SIMBAD	data

Zeta Cephei is a red supergiant star in the northern constellation of Cepheus. Its name is a Bayer designation that is Latinized from ζ Cephei, and abbreviated Zeta Cep or ζ Cep. With an apparent visual magnitude of 3.35, it is a third-magnitude star that is visible to the naked eye. Based on parallax measurements, it is located about 1,000 light-years away from the Earth. Zeta Cephei marks the left shoulder of Cepheus, a mythical King of Aethiopia. It is one of the fundamental stars of the MK spectral sequence, defined as type K1.5 Ib.

== Characteristics ==
Zeta Cephei has a spectral classification of K1.5Ib, indicating that it is a lower luminosity red supergiant star. It is about 172 times larger than the Sun and has a surface temperature of 4,393 K. The luminosity of Zeta Cephei is approximately 10,000 times that of the Sun. At a distance of about 840 light-years, Zeta Cephei has an apparent magnitude (m) of 3.4 and an absolute magnitude (M) of -3.7. The star has a metallicity similar to the Sun.

At a mass of 10.1 M_{☉}, Zeta Cephei might end its life in a core-collapse supernova, and has been listed as a likely pre-supernova candidate by a 2022 study. It could also provide observable pre-supernova neutrino signals, just hours before the core collapses.

Hekker et al. (2008) have detected a periodicity of 533 days, hinting at the possible presence of an as yet unseen companion. It is listed as a candidate eclipsing binary with a very small amplitude. However, spectroscopic measurements made from 1993 to 2015 do not support the presence of the companion.
