= RSGC1 =

Massive open cluster with many red supergiants in the constellation Scutum

- Spitzer and 2MASS image of RSGC1

Observation data (J2000 epoch)
- Right ascension: 18^{h} 36^{m} 29^{s}
- Declination: −06° 52′ 48″
- Distance: 22.0±2.9 kly (6.60±0.89 kpc)
- Apparent magnitude (V): not visible
- Apparent dimensions (V): ~1.5 arcminutes

Physical characteristics
- Mass: ~3×10^{4} M_{☉}
- Radius: 1.5±0.3 pc
- Estimated age: 12±2 my

Associations
- Constellation: Scutum

RSGC1 (Red Supergiant Cluster 1) is a young massive open cluster in the Milky Way galaxy. It was discovered in 2006 in the data generated by several infrared surveys, named for the unprecedented number of red supergiant members. The cluster is located in the constellation Scutum at a distance of about 6.6 kpc from the Sun. It is likely situated at the intersection of the northern end of the Long Bar of the Milky Way and the inner portion of the Scutum–Centaurus Arm—one of its two major spiral arms.

The age of RSGC1 is estimated at 10–14 million years. The cluster is heavily obscured and has not been detected in visible light. It lies close to other groupings of red supergiants known as Stephenson 2, RSGC3, Alicante 7, Alicante 8, and Alicante 10. The mass of RSGC1 is estimated at 30 thousand solar masses (M_{☉}), which makes it one of the most massive open clusters in the galaxy.

The observed red supergiants with the mass of about 16–20 solar masses are type II supernova progenitors. Over 200 main sequence stars have been detected with masses over 8 M_{☉}, which allows the distance to be determined from main sequence fitting. Fourteen red supergiant members have been identified. One pulsar is known as well, making it a candidate site where a Thorne–Żytkow object might be found with gravitational waves.

== Members ==
Prominent supergiants
Star	Spectral type (Note: Values per Humphreys et al. (2020) unless otherwise noted.)	Magnitude (K band)	Temperature (K, effective)	Absolute magnitude	Luminosity (L_{☉})	Radius (R_{☉})
F01	M3 / M5	4.962	3,550	−11.75	335,000	1,530+330 −424
F02	M4 / M2	5.029	3,700	−11.92	215,000	1,128
F03	M4 / M5	5.333	3,500	−11.28	120,000	942
F04	M0 / M1	5.342	3,800	−11.24	380,000	1,422
F05	M6 / M4	5.535	3,500	−11.36	190,000	1,185
F06	M5	5.613	3,400	−10.70	230,000	1,382
F07	M2 / M3	5.631	3,600–3,800	−10.81	190,000	1,006
F08	M3	5.654	3,600	−11.33	200,000	1,150
F09	M3 / M6	5.670	3,600	−10.92	150,000	996
F10	M5 / M3	5.709	3,600	−10.86	235,000	1,246
F11	M1 / M4	5.722	3,800	−11.03	200,000	1,032
F12	M0	5.864	3,900	−10.70	190,000	955
F13	M3 / K2	5.957	4,200	−11.39	290,000	1,017
F14	M3 / M1	6.167	3,700	−10.25	74,000	662
F15	G0 / G6	6.682	6,850	−10.07	229,000–620,000	340

=== RSGC1-F01 ===
RSGC1-F01 is a red supergiant with a radius calculated to be between 1,450 and 1,530 times that of the Sun (R_{☉}) (the radii are calculated by applying the Stefan-Boltzmann law), making it one of the largest stars discovered so far. This corresponds to a volume 3.58 billion times bigger than the Sun. If placed at the center of the Solar System, the photosphere would engulf the orbit of Jupiter.

=== RSGC1-F02 ===
RSGC1-F02 is a red supergiant with a radius calculated to be between 1,499 and 1,549 R_{☉}, or 1,128 R_{☉} (the radii are calculated applying the Stefan-Boltzmann law), making it one of the largest stars discovered so far. This corresponds to a volume 3.37 to 3.72 billion times bigger than the Sun. If placed at the center of the Solar System, its photosphere would engulf the orbit of Jupiter.

=== RSGC1-F13 ===
RSGC1-F13 is a peculiar red supergiant or hypergiant that is unusually red compared to the other stars. It is notable for having the highest mass-loss rate in the cluster at (2.7±0.8)×10^{−5} M_{☉}/yr. The star also has detected masers of SiO, H_{2}O, and OH. ALMA detects CO emission in F13 along with four other supergiants in the cluster extending hundreds of stellar radii away from the stars. The CO mass loss rate is estimated to be 4.2×10^{−5} M_{☉}/yr, which is an order of magnitude larger than the predicted value for the other red supergiants in the study. F13 is compared with VY Canis Majoris as a similarly extreme red supergiant, both displaying stronger and possibly eruptive mass loss.

Most studies gave RSGC1-F13 luminosity estimates around 200,000 L_{☉}. Due to its significant reddening and mass-loss rate when compared to other red supergiants within its parent open cluster, those values may be underestimated, leading to a calculated value as large as 550,000 L_{☉}, placing it far above the Humphreys–Davidson limit. Assuming it is correct, this may be due to an evolutionary phase change.

== Gallery ==
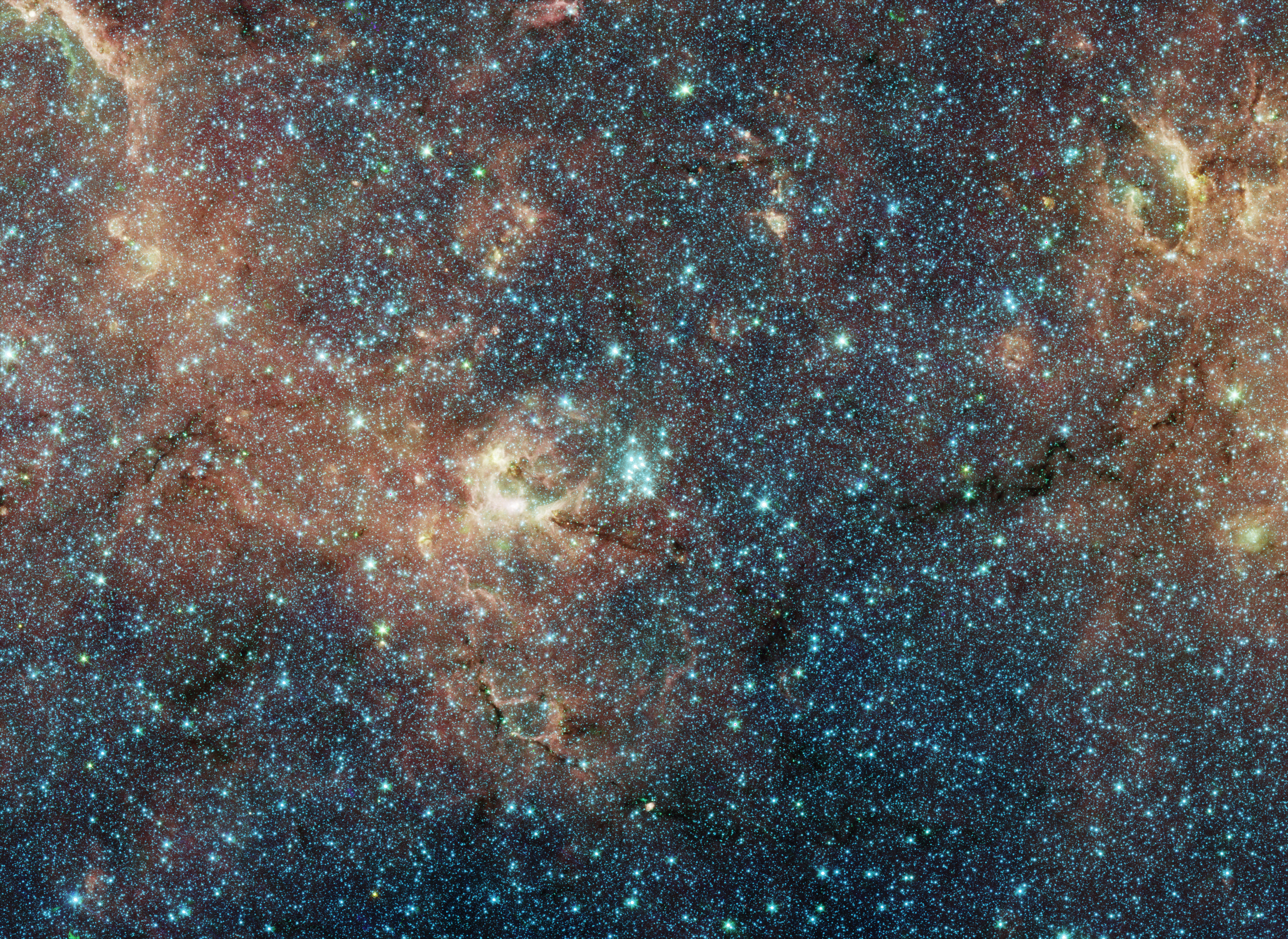
Spitzer wide-field image of surroundings region around RSGC1 cluster

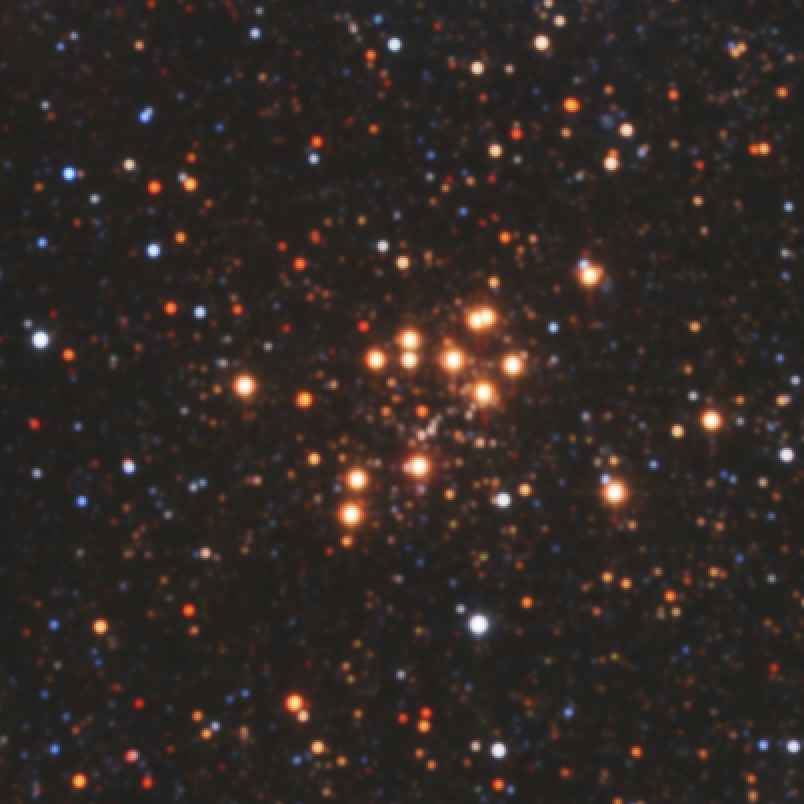
2MASS image of RSGC1 cluster

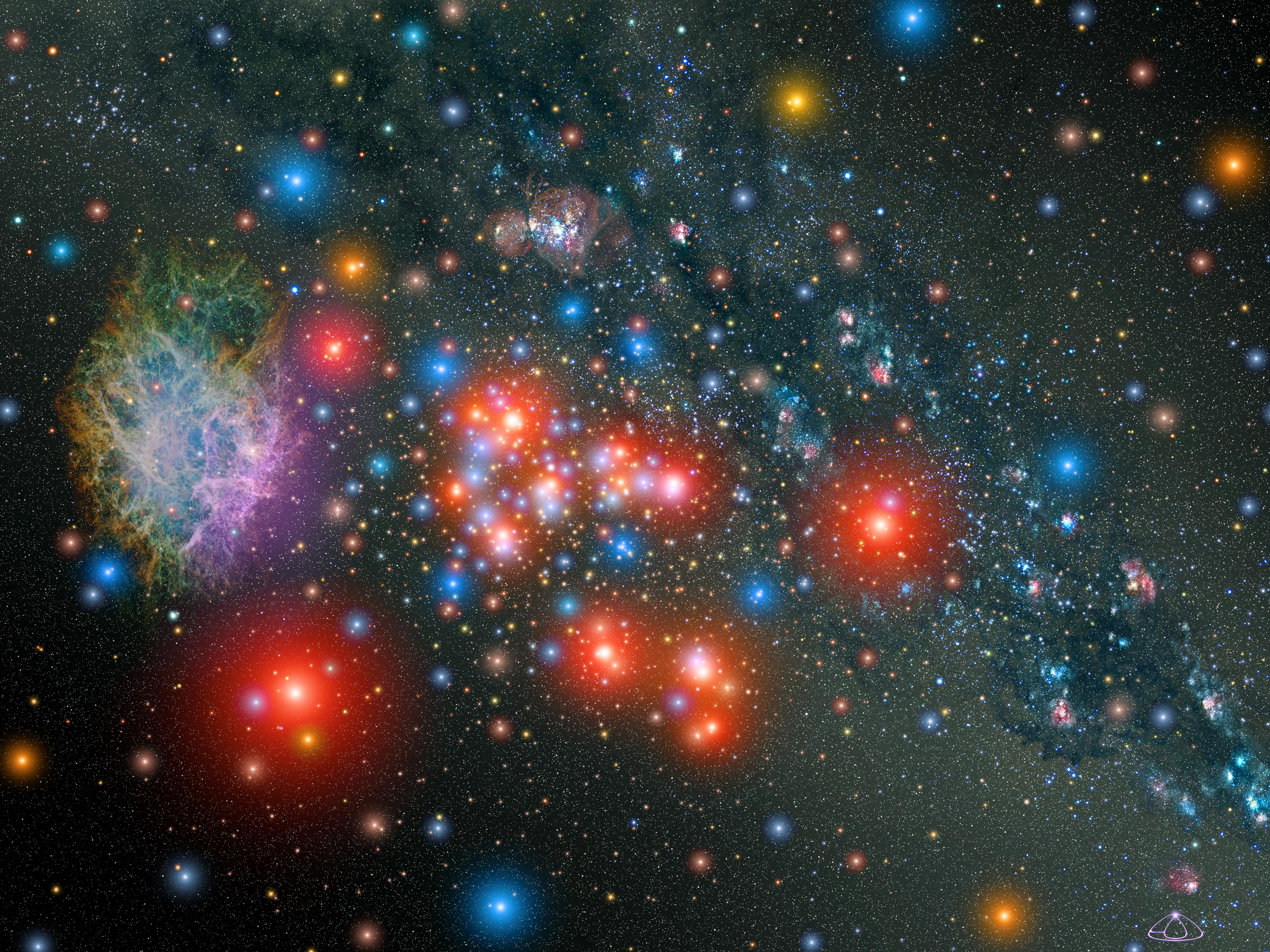
Artistic representation of RSGC1 cluster
