= NML Cygni =

Star in the constellation Cygnus

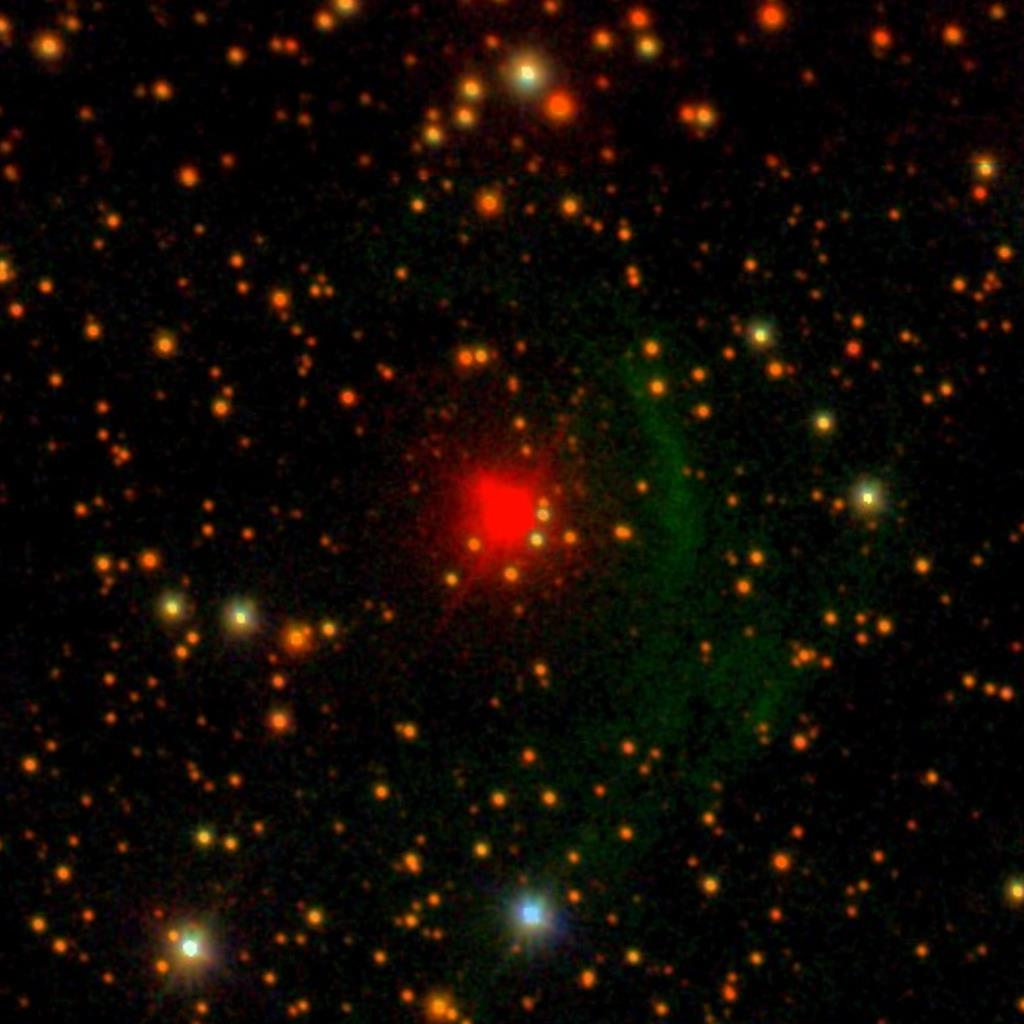
- NML Cygni, seen as the deep red star at the center, from the Sloan Digital Sky Survey DR9. Note the green circumstellar nebula surrounding the star.

Observation data Epoch J2000.0 Equinox J2000.0
- Constellation: Cygnus
- Right ascension: 20^{h} 46^{m} 25.54^{s}
- Declination: +40° 06′ 59.5″
- Apparent magnitude (V): 16.60 (variable)

Characteristics
- Evolutionary stage: OH/IR RHG
- Spectral type: M6Ia
- Apparent magnitude (K): 0.791±0.204
- Apparent magnitude (G): 11.148
- Apparent magnitude (J): 4.877±0.037
- Apparent magnitude (H): 2.389±0.2
- B−V color index: +2.04
- Variable type: SR

Astrometry
Proper motion (μ)	RA: −1.55 mas/yr Dec.: −4.59 mas/yr
Parallax (π)	0.620±0.047 mas
Distance	5,250+420 −360 ly (1,610+130 −110 pc)

Details
Mass	25 (initial) M_{☉}
Radius	1,590±40 (Note: Calculated, using the Stefan-Boltzmann law and the star's effective temperature and luminosity, with respect to the solar nominal effective temperature of 5,772 K: $$\sqrt{\biggl(\frac{5,772}{3,300}\biggr)^4 \cdot (104,000 \cdot 1.61^2) } = 1,590\ R_\odot.$$) R_{☉}
Luminosity	229,000+40,100 −34,100–270,000±13,000 L_{☉}
Temperature	3,300 K
Age	8 Myr

Other designations
- NML Cyg, NML Cygnus, V1489 Cyg, AAVSO 2042+39, IRC +40448, 2MASS J20462554+4006594

Database references
SIMBAD	data

NML Cygni or V1489 Cygni (abbreviated to NML Cyg or V1489 Cyg) is a red hypergiant or red supergiant (RHG or RSG) in the constellation Cygnus. It is one of the largest known stars, and is also one of the most luminous and massive cool hypergiants, as well as one of the most luminous stars in the Milky Way.

The distance of NML Cygni from Earth is estimated to be around 1.6 kpc, about 5,300 light-years. It is a part of the Cygnus OB2 association, one of the closest massive associations to the Sun, spanning nearly 2° on the sky or ~30 pc in radius at the distance of 1.74±0.2 kpc. Based on an estimated luminosity 270,000 L_{☉} and an effective temperature of 3,300 K, NML Cygni's physical radius is estimated to be roughly 1,590 R_{☉}. If placed at the center of the Solar System, its surface would potentially extend past the orbit of Jupiter.

== Observational history ==
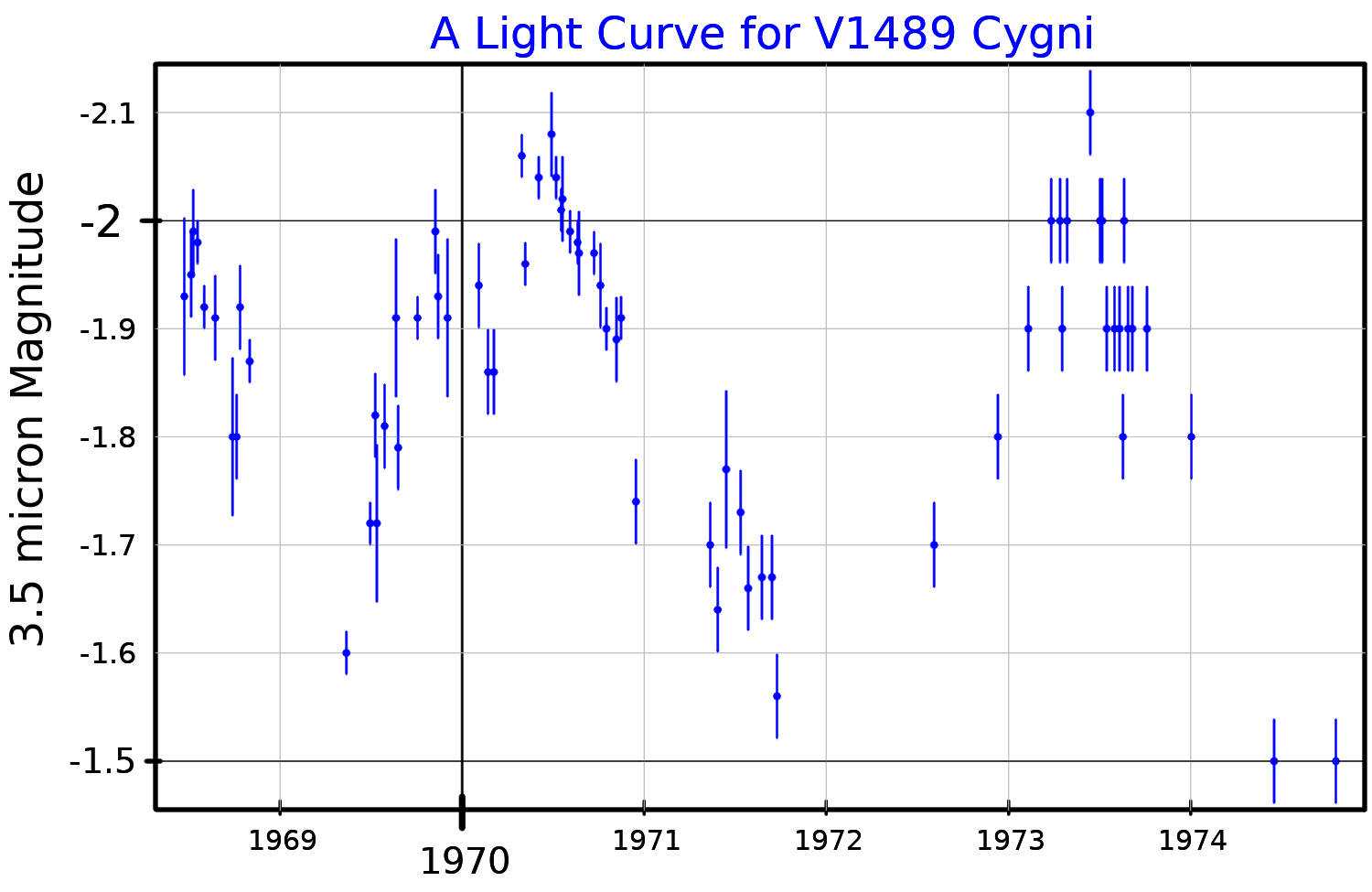
A near infrared (3.5 micron) light curve for V1489 Cygni, plotted from data published by Strecker (1975)

NML Cygni was discovered in 1965 by American astronomers Neugebauer, Martz, and Leighton who described two extremely red luminous stars, their colour being consistent with a black body temperature of 1,000 K. The name NML comes from the names of these three discoverers. The second star was briefly referred to as NML Tauri but is now known as IK Tauri, an M9 Mira variable. Low-dispersion spectra taken later that same year revealed strong molecular bands of TiO and VO, confirming its status as a very late-type star with a spectral type no earlier than M6. NML Cygni has since also been given the designation V1489 Cygni on account of the small semi-regular brightness variations, but is still most commonly referred to as NML Cygni. Its composition began to be revealed with the discovery of OH masers (1612 MHz) in 1968. H_{2}O, SiO, CO, HCN, CS, SO, SO_{2}, and H_{2}S molecules have also been detected.

== Physical characteristics ==
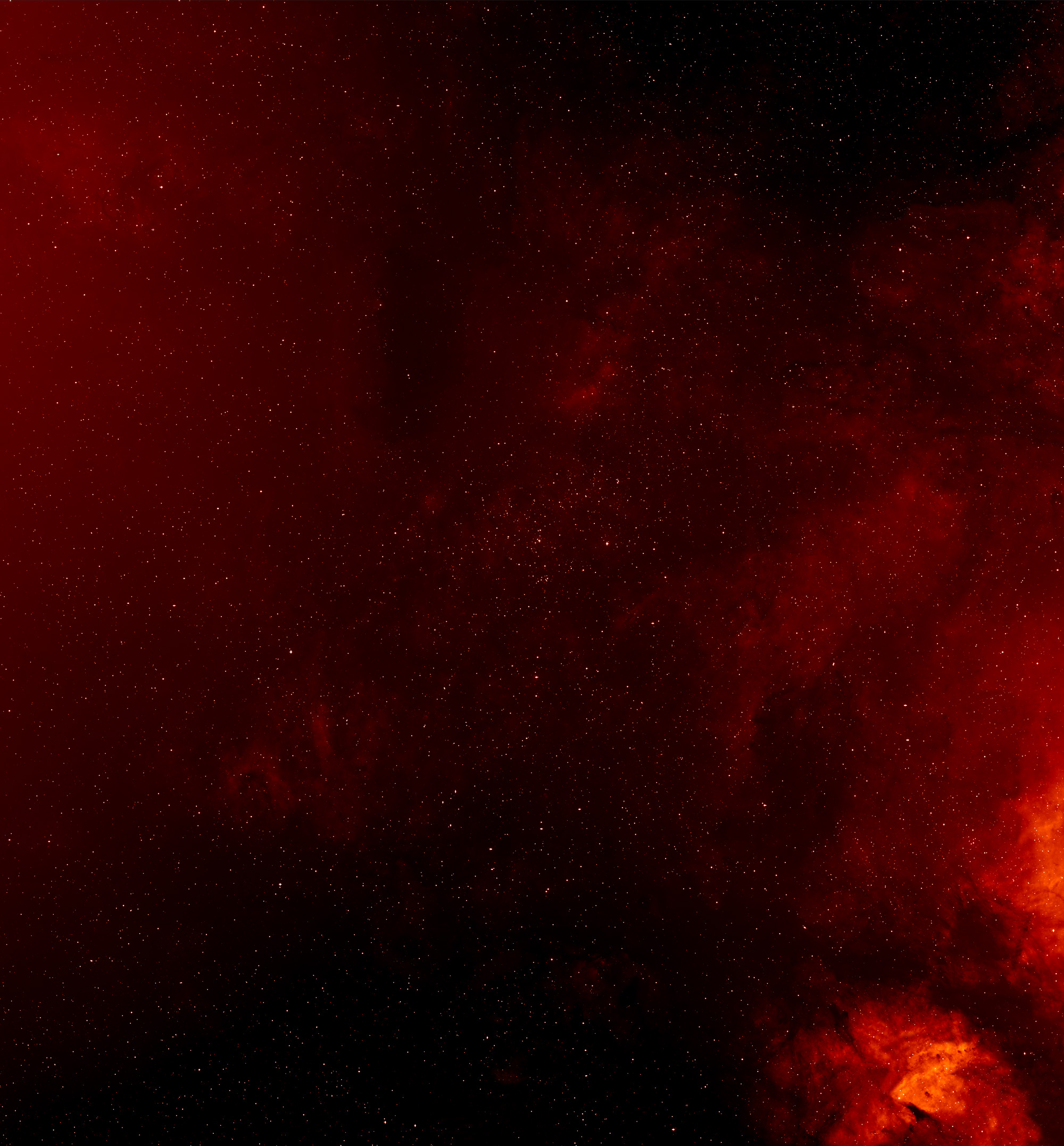
H-alpha light image of Cygnus OB2, the stellar association in which NML Cygni is located

NML Cygni is an extremely large and luminous cool supergiant with parameters similar to that of another notable but more extreme cool hypergiant star, VY Canis Majoris, and is also known as a heavily mass-losing OH/IR supergiant. It is also a semiregular variable star with a period of either 1,280 or 940 days. It occupies the upper-right hand corner of the Hertzsprung–Russell diagram although most of the properties of the star depend directly on its distance.

=== Size, luminosity, and temperature ===
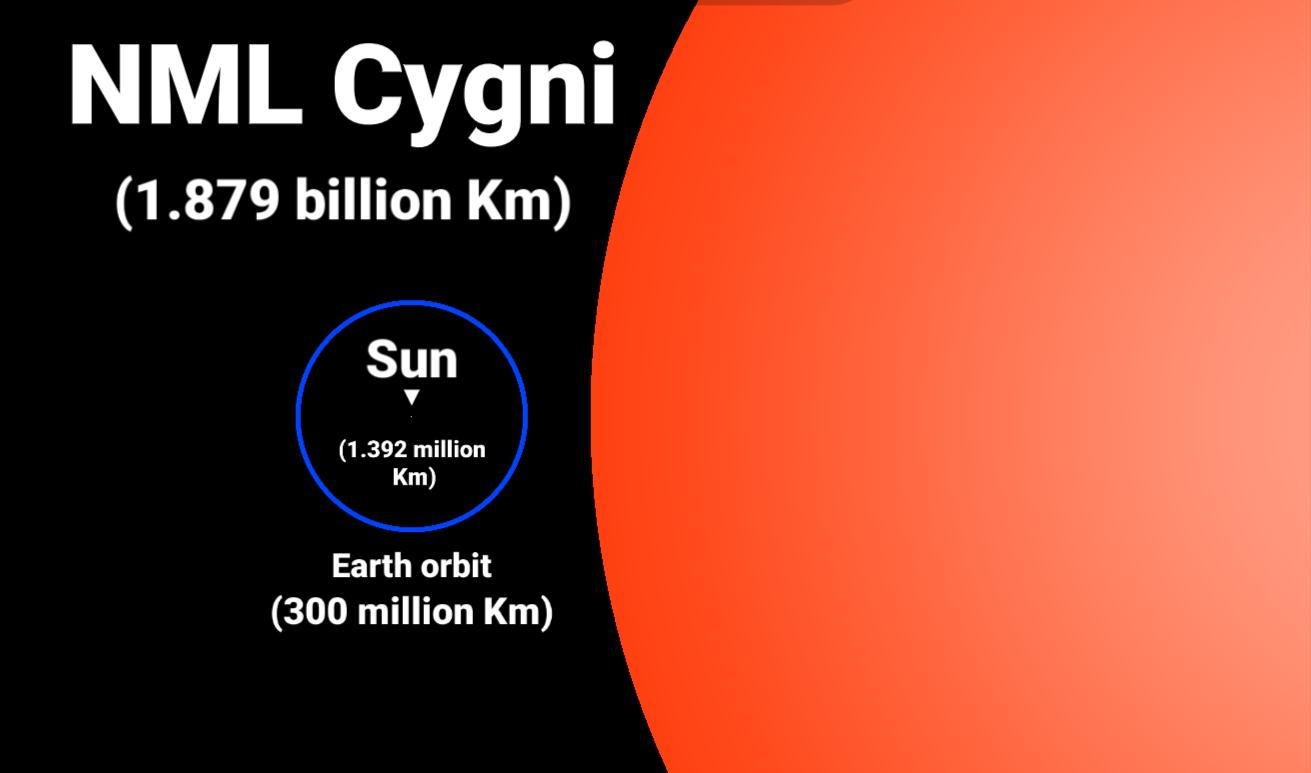
NML Cygni compared to the Sun and Earth's orbit.

The bolometric luminosity (L_{bol}) for NML Cygni was originally calculated to be 500,000 L_{☉} at an assumed distance of 2 kpc and the radius was calculated to be 3,700 R_{☉} based on an 8.6 mas angular radius and distance. A 2006 study, similar to those conducted on VY Canis Majoris, suggests that NML Cygni is a normal red supergiant with consequently much lower luminosity and radius values. A 2010 paper gives a radius of 1,183 R_{☉} based on an assumed effective temperature of 3,834 K and a distance of 1.22 kpc. More modern and accurate measurements give a distance around 1.6 kpc, which gives a luminosity around 230,000 L_{☉}. A radio angular diameter of 44 mas was given based on the distance, suggesting the optical angular diameter may be around 22 mas. This distance and a luminosity of 270,000 L_{☉} were combined with assumptions of the effective temperature of the star, giving a radius of 1,640 R_{☉} for a temperature of 3,250 K or possibly 2,770 R_{☉} for a temperature of 2,500 K. (Note: Applying the Stefan-Boltzmann Law with a nominal solar effective temperature of 5,772 K: $$\sqrt{(5,772/3,250)^4 \times 270,000} = 1638.96\ R_\odot$$ $$\sqrt{(5,772/2,500)^4 \times 270,000} = 2769.84\ R_\odot$$) There is a Gaia Data Release 2 parallax for NML Cygni of 1.5259±0.5677 mas, but the underlying measurements show a considerable level of noise and the parallax is considered unreliable.

Interferometric observations of NML Cygni in the K-band are consistent with a uniform disk with a size of 7.8±0.64 milliarcseconds. The authors emphasize that the relation of this measurement to the true photospheric diameter requires knowledge of the limb darkening and other effects. The exact degree of contribution to the measurement from circumstellar and photospheric emission is also not known, leading to an even higher degree of uncertainty. Assuming the distance measured by Zhang et al. (2012) (1610+130
−110 parsecs), this measure would correspond to a physical radius of 1,350 R_{☉}.

=== Mass and mass loss ===
Comparison of the effective temperature and modern bolometric luminosity estimates of NML Cygni compared to evolutionary tracks for massive stars suggests an initial mass of 25 M_{☉}. The star has an estimated mass loss rate of 4.2 to 4.8×10^{−4} M_{☉} per year, one of the highest known for any star.

== Surroundings ==
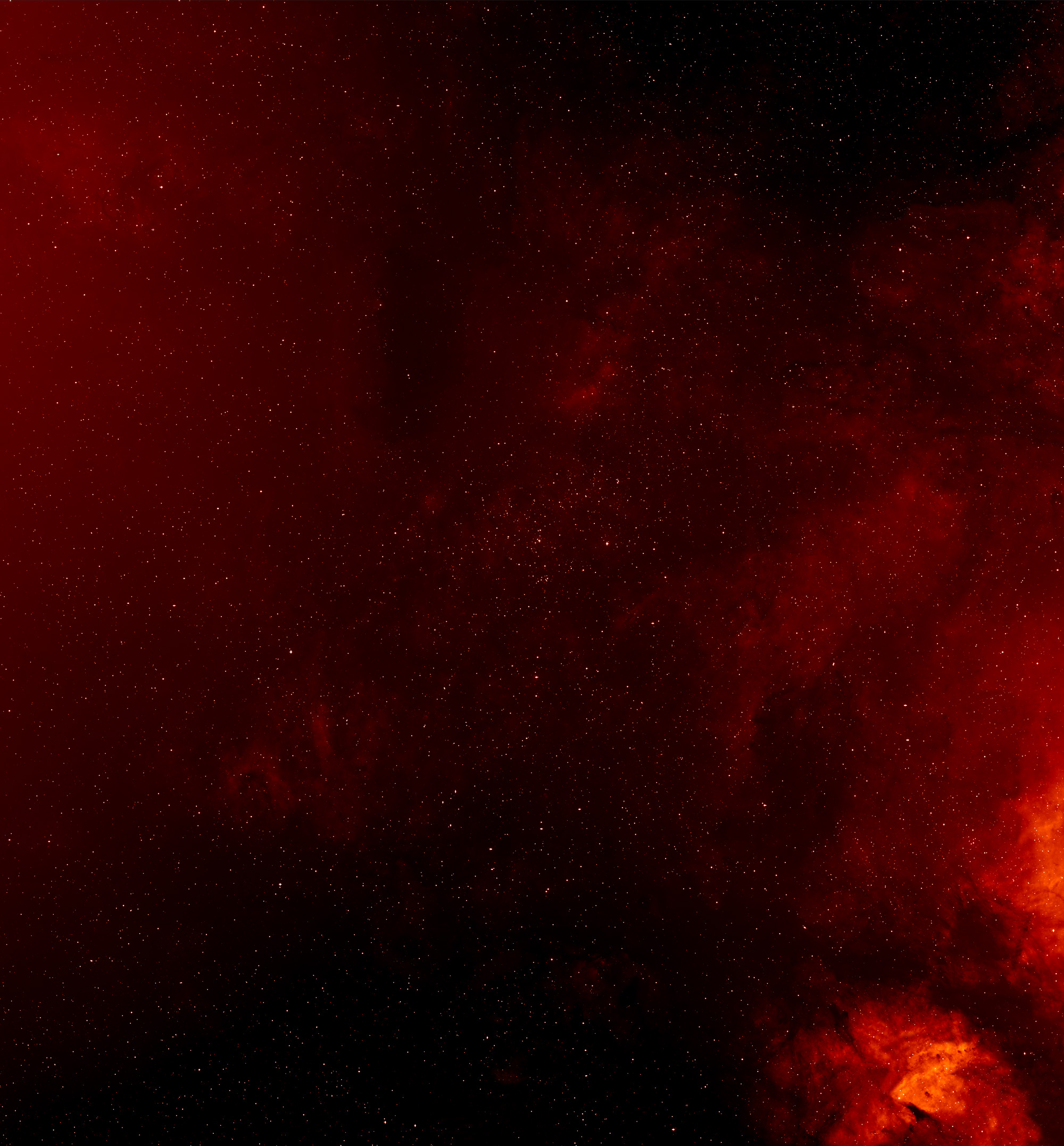
H-alpha light image of Cygnus OB2, the stellar association in which NML Cygni is located

A number of heavy elements and molecules around NML Cygni have been detected in its atmosphere, particularly oxygen, hydroxyl, and water. It is surrounded by dusty material and it exhibits a bean-shaped asymmetric nebula that is coincident with the distribution of its H_{2}O vapor masers.

From the observations, it is estimated that NML Cygni has two discrete optically thick envelopes of dust and molecules. The optical depth of the inner shell is found to be 1.9, whereas that of the outer one is 0.33. These dust envelopes are formed due to the strong post-main-sequence wind, which has a velocity 23 km/s.

Because of the star's position on the outskirts of the massive Cygnus OB2 association, the detectable effects of NML Cygni's radiation on the surrounding dust and gas are limited to the region away from the central hot stars of the association.

=== Possible companion ===
As of 2026, NML Cygni has no confirmed companions. However, a 2025 paper suggests that one might exist based on the asymmetries in NML Cygni's circumstellar environment and simulations run in a 2024 paper.

== Evolutionary stage ==
NML Cygni is highly evolved and lies close to the expected position that a 25 M_{☉} star would evolve to after eight million years. Due to its similarity to VY CMa, NML Cygni has been suggested in 2025 to be a possible candidate for a star in a second red supergiant phase; similar to less massive AGB stars, it may have once evolved blueward into a post-RSG warm hypergiant and then redward into an extreme red supergiant in a very short and final high mass loss state following a blue loop, before eventually exploding into a supernova or directly collapsing to a black hole.

== See also ==
- Stephenson 2 DFK 1
- UY Scuti
- VX Sagittarii
- Westerlund 1 W26
- WOH G64
