= Scutum–Centaurus Arm =

Spiral arm of the Milky Way

Observed structure of the Milky Way's spiral arms

The Scutum–Centaurus Arm, also known as Scutum-Crux arm, is a long, diffuse curving streamer of stars, gas and dust that spirals outward from the proximate end of the Milky Way's central bar. The Milky Way has been posited since the 1950s to have four spiral arms; numerous studies contest or nuance this number. In 2008, observations using the Spitzer Space Telescope failed to show the expected density of red clump giants in the direction of the Carina–Sagittarius Arm and Norma Arm. In January 2014, a 12-year study into the distribution and lifespan of massive stars and a 2013-reporting study of the distribution of masers and open clusters both found corroboratory, though would not state irrefutable, evidence for four principal spiral arms.

The Scutum–Centaurus Arm lies between the minor Carina–Sagittarius Arm and the minor Norma Arm. The Scutum–Centaurus Arm starts near the core as the Scutum Arm, then gradually turns into the Centaurus Arm.

The region where the Scutum–Centaurus Arm connects to the bar of the galaxy is rich in star-forming regions and open clusters. In 2006 a large cluster of new stars containing 14 red supergiant stars was discovered there and named RSGC1. In 2007 a cluster of approximately 50,000 newly formed stars named RSGC2 was located only a few hundred light-years from RSGC1. It is thought to be less than 20 million years old and contains 26 red supergiant stars, the largest grouping of such stars known. Other clusters in this region include RSGC3 and Alicante 8.

== See also ==
- Galactic disc
