= K band (infrared) =

Band of infrared light

In infrared astronomy, the K band is an atmospheric transmission window centered on 2.2 μm (in the near-infrared 136 THz range). HgCdTe-based detectors are typically preferred for observing in this band.

Photometric systems used in astronomy are sets of filters or detectors that have well-defined windows of absorption, based around a central peak detection frequency and where the edges of the detection window are typically reported where sensitivity drops below 50% of peak. Various organizations have defined systems with various peak frequencies and cutoffs in the K band, including K′, and K_{S}, and K_{dark}.

== See also ==
- Absolute magnitude
