= Red supergiant =

Stars with a supergiant luminosity class with a spectral type of K or M

Red supergiants (RSGs) are stars with a supergiant luminosity class (Yerkes class I) and a stellar classification K or M. They are the largest stars in the universe in terms of volume, although they are not the most massive or luminous. Betelgeuse and Antares A are the brightest and best known red supergiants (RSGs), indeed the only first magnitude red supergiant stars.

== Classification ==
Stars are classified as supergiants on the basis of their spectral luminosity class. This system uses certain diagnostic spectral lines to estimate the surface gravity of a star, hence determining its size relative to its mass. Larger stars are more luminous at a given temperature and can now be grouped into bands of differing luminosity.

The luminosity differences between stars are most apparent at low temperatures, where giant stars are much brighter than main-sequence stars. Supergiants have the lowest surface gravities and hence are the largest and brightest at a particular temperature.

The Yerkes or Morgan-Keenan (MK) classification system is almost universal. It groups stars into five main luminosity groups designated by roman numerals:

- I supergiant;
- II bright giant;
- III giant;
- IV subgiant;
- V dwarf (main sequence).

Specific to supergiants, the luminosity class is further divided into normal supergiants of class Ib and brightest supergiants of class Ia. The intermediate class Iab is also used. Exceptionally bright, low surface gravity, stars with strong indications of mass loss may be designated by luminosity class 0 (zero) although this is rarely seen. More often the designation Ia-0 will be used, and more commonly still Ia^{+}. These hypergiant spectral classifications are very rarely applied to red supergiants, although the term red hypergiant is sometimes used for the most extended and unstable red supergiants like VY Canis Majoris and NML Cygni.

The "red" part of "red supergiant" refers to the cool temperature. Red supergiants are the coolest supergiants, M-type, and at least some K-type stars although there is no precise cutoff. K-type supergiants are uncommon compared to M-type because they are a short-lived transition stage and somewhat unstable. The K-type stars, especially early or hotter K types, are sometimes described as orange supergiants (e.g. Zeta Cephei), or even as yellow (e.g. yellow hypergiant HR 5171 Aa).

== Properties ==
Temperature scale for red supergiants
Spectral type	Temperature (K)
K1–1.5	4,100
K2–3	4,015
K5–M0	3,840
M0	3,790
M1	3,745
M1.5	3,710
M2	3,660
M2.5	3,615
M3	3,605
M3.5	3,550
M4–4.5	3,535
M5	3,450

Red supergiants are cool and large. They have spectral types of K and M, hence surface temperatures below 4,100 K. They are typically several hundred to over a thousand times the radius of the Sun, although size is not the primary factor in a star being designated as a supergiant. A bright cool giant star can easily be larger than a hotter supergiant. For example, Alpha Herculis is classified as a giant star with a radius of between 264 and 303 R_{☉} while Epsilon Pegasi is a K2 supergiant of only 185 R_{☉}.

Although red supergiants are much cooler than the Sun, they are so much larger that they are highly luminous, typically tens or hundreds of thousands L_{☉}. There is a theoretical upper limit to the radius of a red supergiant at around 1,500 R_{☉}. In the Hayashi limit, stars above this radius would be too unstable and simply do not form.

Red supergiants have masses between about 10 M_{☉} and 30 or 40 M_{☉}. Main-sequence stars more massive than about 40 M_{☉} do not expand and cool to become red supergiants. Red supergiants at the upper end of the possible mass and luminosity range are the largest known. Their low surface gravities and high luminosities cause extreme mass loss, millions of times higher than the Sun, producing observable nebulae surrounding the star. By the end of their lives red supergiants may have lost a substantial fraction of their initial mass. The more massive supergiants lose mass much more rapidly and all red supergiants appear to reach a similar mass of the order of 10 M_{☉} by the time their cores collapse. The exact value depends on the initial chemical makeup of the star and its rotation rate.

Most red supergiants show some degree of visual variability, but only rarely with a well-defined period or amplitude. Therefore, they are usually classified as irregular or semiregular variables. They even have their own sub-classes, SRC and LC for slow semi-regular and slow irregular supergiant variables respectively. Variations are typically slow and of small amplitude, but amplitudes up to four magnitudes are known.

Statistical analysis of many known variable red supergiants shows a number of likely causes for variation: just a few stars show large amplitudes and strong noise indicating variability at many frequencies, thought to indicate powerful stellar winds that occur towards the end of the life of a red supergiant; more common are simultaneous radial mode variations over a few hundred days and probably non-radial mode variations over a few thousand days; only a few stars appear to be truly irregular, with small amplitudes, likely due to photospheric granulation. Red supergiant photospheres contain a relatively small number of very large convection cells compared to stars like the Sun. This causes variations in surface brightness that can lead to visible brightness variations as the star rotates.

The spectra of red supergiants are similar to other cool stars, dominated by a forest of absorption lines of metals and molecular bands. Some of these features are used to determine the luminosity class, for example certain near-infrared cyanogen band strengths and the Ca II triplet.

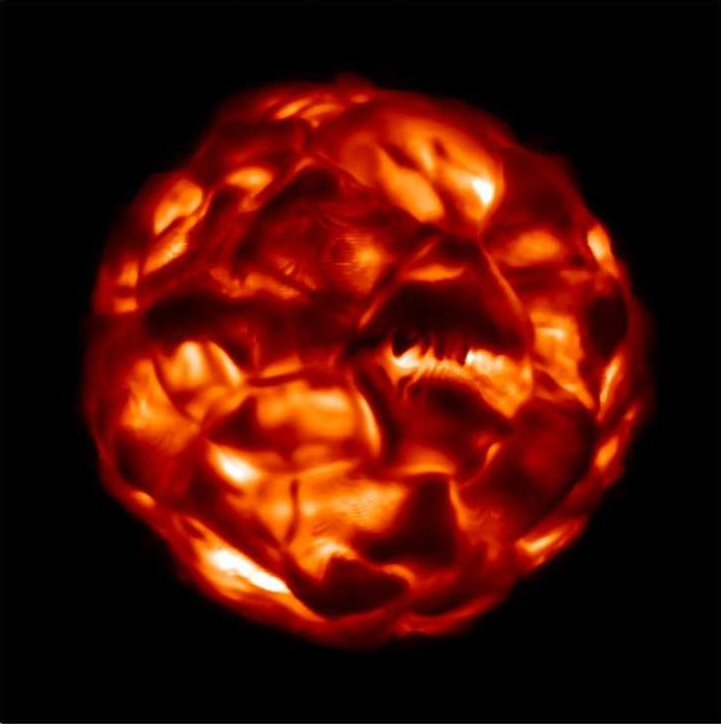
Fluid dynamics simulations of a red supergiant, with giant convection cells and puffy surface

Maser emission is common from the circumstellar material around red supergiants. Most commonly this arises from H_{2}O and SiO, but hydroxyl (OH) emission also occurs from narrow regions. In addition to high resolution mapping of the circumstellar material around red supergiants, VLBI or VLBA observations of masers can be used to derive accurate parallaxes and distances to their sources. Currently this has been applied mainly to individual objects, but it may become useful for analysis of galactic structure and discovery of otherwise obscured red supergiant stars.

Surface abundances of red supergiants are dominated by hydrogen even though hydrogen at the core has been completely consumed. In the latest stages of mass loss, before a star explodes, surface helium may become enriched to levels comparable with hydrogen. In theoretical extreme mass loss models, sufficient hydrogen may be lost that helium becomes the most abundant element at the surface. When pre-red supergiant stars leave the main sequence, oxygen is more abundant than carbon at the surface, and nitrogen is less abundant than either, reflecting abundances from the formation of the star. Carbon and oxygen are quickly depleted and nitrogen enhanced as a result of the dredge-up of CNO-processed material from the fusion layers.

Red supergiants are observed to rotate slowly or very slowly. Models indicate that even rapidly rotating main-sequence stars should be braked by their mass loss so that red supergiants hardly rotate at all. Those red supergiants such as Betelgeuse that do have modest rates of rotation may have acquired it after reaching the red supergiant stage, perhaps through binary interaction. The cores of red supergiants are still rotating and the differential rotation rate can be very large.

== Definition ==
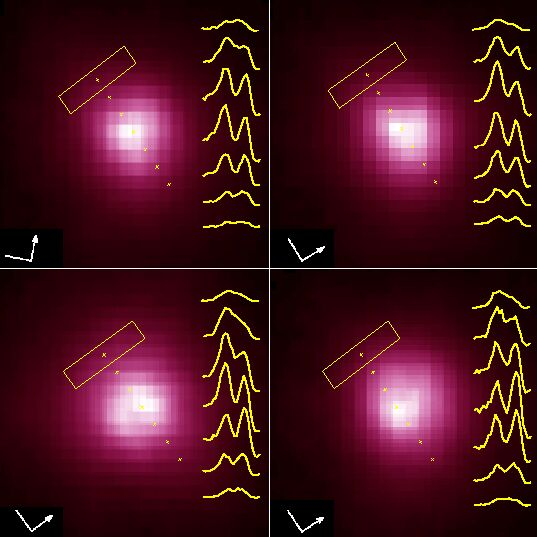
Betelgeuse pulsating and showing spectral line profile changes (HST UV images)

Supergiant luminosity classes are easy to determine and apply to large numbers of stars, but they group several very different types of stars into a single category. An evolutionary definition restricts the term supergiant to those massive stars which start core helium fusion without developing a degenerate helium core and without undergoing a helium flash. They will universally go on to burn heavier elements and undergo core-collapse resulting in a supernova.

Less massive stars may develop a supergiant spectral luminosity class at relatively low luminosity, around 1,000 L_{☉} when they are on the asymptotic giant branch (AGB) undergoing helium shell burning. Researchers now prefer to categorize these as AGB stars distinct from supergiants because they are less massive, have different chemical compositions at the surface, undergo different types of pulsation and variability, and will evolve differently, usually producing a planetary nebula and white dwarf. Most AGB stars will not become supernovae although there is interest in a class of super-AGB stars, those almost massive enough to undergo full carbon fusion, which may produce peculiar supernovae although without ever developing an iron core. One notable group of low mass high luminosity stars are the RV Tauri variables, AGB or post-AGB stars lying on the instability strip and showing distinctive semi-regular variations.

== Evolution ==
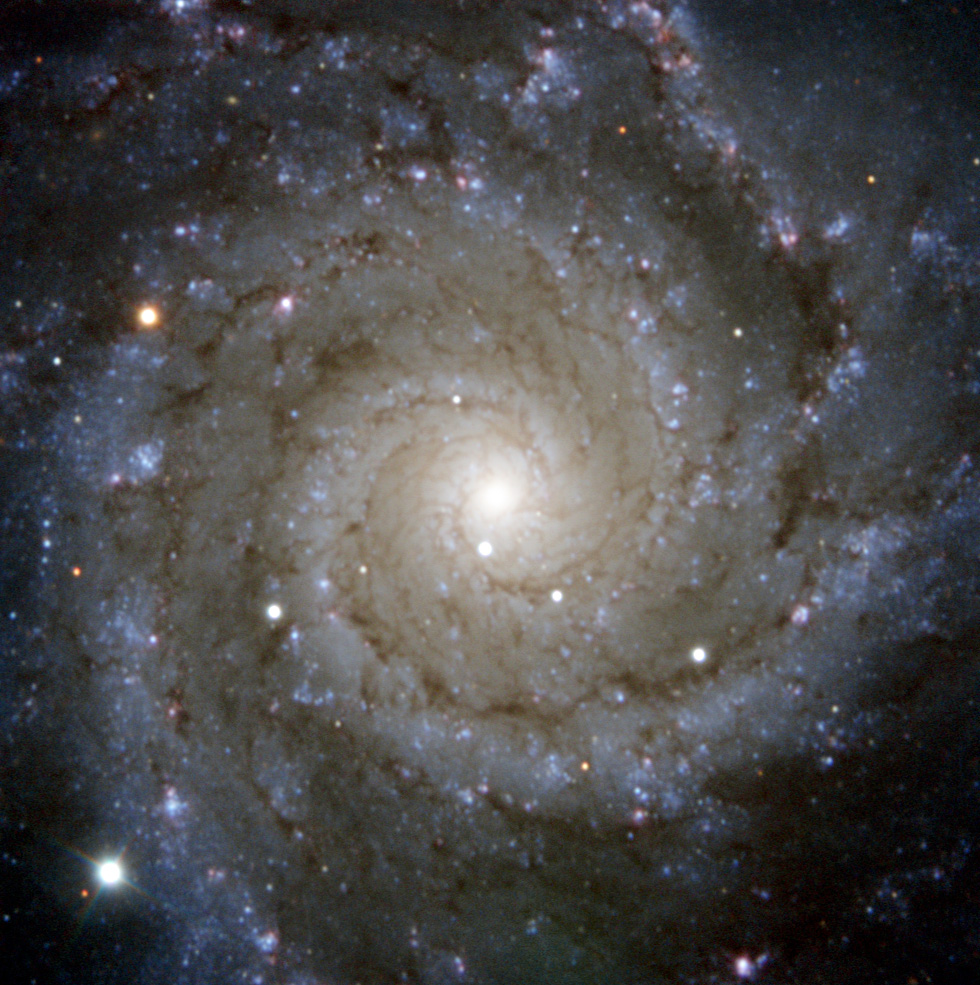
Most red supergiants end their lives as a Type II supernova, such as SN2013ej at bottom left in a spiral arm of M74.

Red supergiants develop from main-sequence stars with masses between about 8 M_{☉} and 30 or 40 M_{☉}. Higher-mass stars never cool sufficiently to become red supergiants. Lower-mass stars develop a degenerate helium core during a red giant phase, undergo a helium flash before fusing helium on the horizontal branch, evolve along the AGB while burning helium in a shell around a degenerate carbon-oxygen core, then rapidly lose their outer layers to become a white dwarf with a planetary nebula. AGB stars may develop spectra with a supergiant luminosity class as they expand to extreme dimensions relative to their small mass, and they may reach luminosities tens of thousands times the sun's. Intermediate "super-AGB" stars, around 7–9 M_{☉}, can undergo carbon fusion and may produce an electron capture supernova through the collapse of an oxygen–neon core.

Main-sequence stars, burning hydrogen in their cores, with masses between 10 and 30 or 40 M_{☉} will have temperatures between about 25,000K and 32,000K and spectral types of early B, possibly very late O. They are already very luminous stars of 10,000–100,000 L_{☉} due to rapid CNO cycle fusion of hydrogen and they have fully convective cores. In contrast to the Sun, the outer layers of these hot main-sequence stars are not convective.

These pre-red supergiant main-sequence stars exhaust the hydrogen in their cores after 5–20 million years. They then start to burn a shell of hydrogen around the now-predominantly helium core, and this causes them to expand and cool into supergiants. Their luminosity increases by a factor of about three. The surface abundance of helium is now up to 40% but there is little enrichment of heavier elements.

The supergiants continue to cool and most will rapidly pass through the Cepheid instability strip, although the most massive will spend a brief period as yellow hypergiants. They will reach late K or M class and become a red supergiant. Helium fusion in the core begins smoothly either while the star is expanding or once it is already a red supergiant, but this produces little immediate change at the surface. Red supergiants develop deep convection zones reaching from the surface over halfway to the core and these cause strong enrichment of nitrogen at the surface, with some enrichment of heavier elements.

Some red supergiants undergo blue loops where they temporarily increase in temperature before returning to the red supergiant state. This depends on the mass, rate of rotation, and chemical makeup of the star. While many red supergiants will not experience a blue loop, some can have several. Temperatures can reach 10,000K at the peak of the blue loop. The exact reasons for blue loops vary in different stars, but they are always related to the helium core increasing as a proportion of the mass of the star and forcing higher mass-loss rates from the outer layers.

All red supergiants will exhaust the helium in their cores within one or two million years and then start to burn carbon. This continues with fusion of heavier elements until an iron core builds up, which then inevitably collapses to produce a supernova. The time from the onset of carbon fusion until the core collapse is no more than a few thousand years. In most cases, core-collapse occurs while the star is still a red supergiant, the large remaining hydrogen-rich atmosphere is ejected, and this produces a Type II supernova spectrum. The opacity of this ejected hydrogen decreases as it cools and this causes an extended delay to the drop in brightness after the initial supernova peak, the characteristic of a Type II-P supernova.

The most luminous red supergiants, at near solar metallicity, are expected to lose most of their outer layers before their cores collapse, hence they evolve back to yellow hypergiants and luminous blue variables. Such stars can explode as Type II-L supernovae, still with hydrogen in their spectra but not with sufficient hydrogen to cause an extended brightness plateau in their light curves. Stars with even less hydrogen remaining may produce the uncommon Type IIb supernova, where there is so little hydrogen remaining that the hydrogen lines in the initial Type II spectrum fade to the appearance of a Type Ib supernova.

The observed progenitors of Type II-P supernovae all have temperatures between 3,500K and 4,400K and luminosities between 10,000 L_{☉} and 300,000 L_{☉}. This matches the expected parameters of lower mass red supergiants. A small number of progenitors of Type II-L and Type IIb supernovae have been observed, all having luminosities around 100,000 L_{☉} and somewhat higher temperatures up to 6,000K. These are a good match for slightly higher mass red supergiants with high mass-loss rates. There are no known supernova progenitors corresponding to the most luminous red supergiants, and it is expected that these evolve to Wolf Rayet stars before exploding.

== Clusters ==
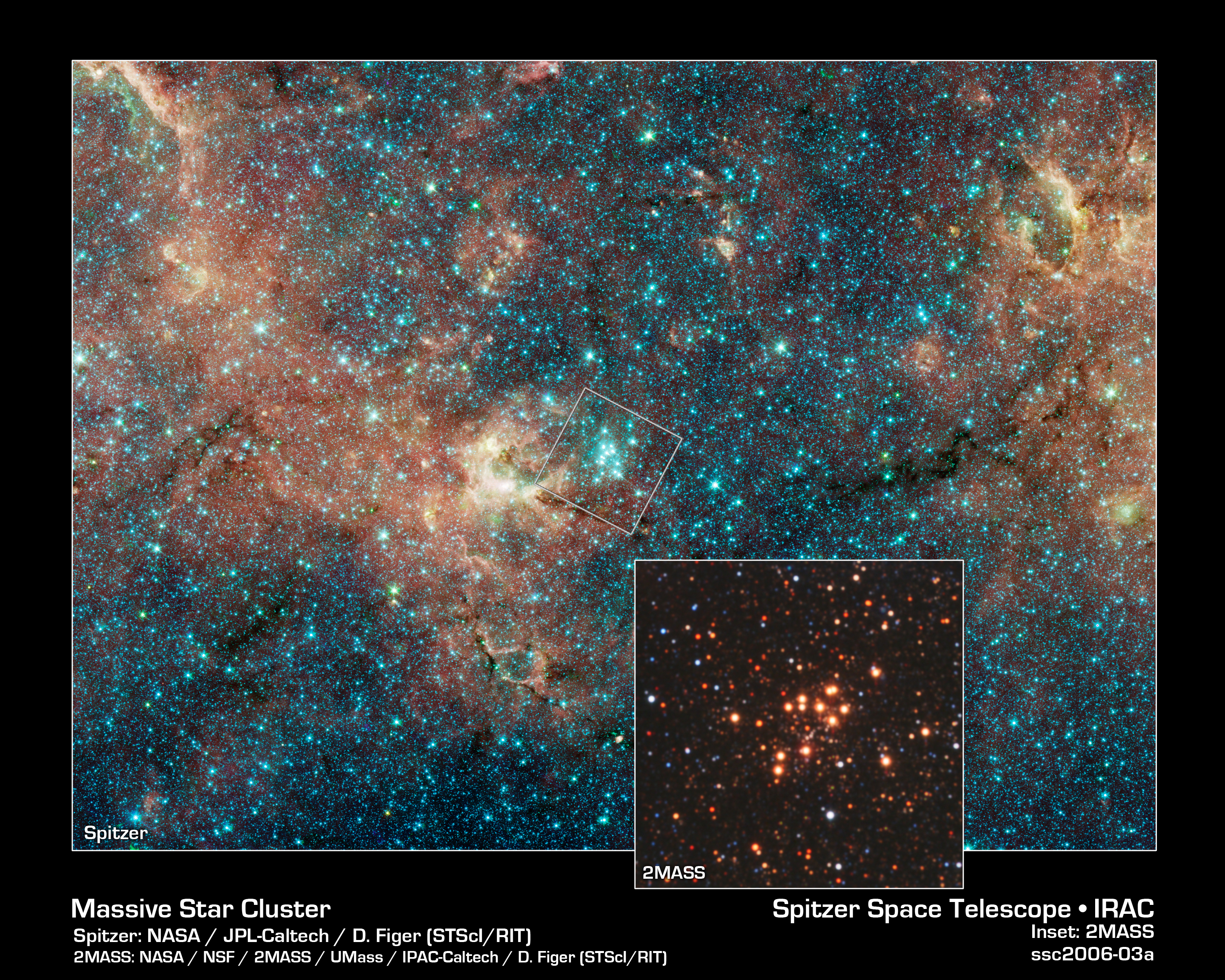
RSGC1, the first of several massive clusters found to contain multiple red supergiants.

Red supergiants are necessarily no more than about 25 million years old and such massive stars are expected to form only in relatively large clusters of stars, so they are expected to be found mostly near prominent clusters. However they are fairly short-lived compared to other phases in the life of a star and only form from relatively uncommon massive stars, so there will generally only be small numbers of red supergiants in each cluster at any one time. The massive Hodge 301 cluster in the Tarantula Nebula contains three. Until the 21st century the largest number of red supergiants known in a single cluster was five in NGC 7419. Most red supergiants are found singly, for example Betelgeuse in the Orion OB1 association and Antares in the Scorpius–Centaurus association.

Since 2006, a series of massive clusters have been identified near the base of the Crux-Scutum Arm of the galaxy, each containing multiple red supergiants. RSGC1 contains at least 12 red supergiants, RSGC2 (also known as Stephenson 2) contains at least 26, RSGC3 contains at least 8, and RSGC4 (also known as Alicante 8) also contains at least 8. A total of 80 confirmed red supergiants have been identified within a small area of the sky in the direction of these clusters. These four clusters appear to be part of a massive burst of star formation 10–20 million years ago at the near end of the bar at the centre of the galaxy. Similar massive clusters have been found near the far end of the galactic bar, but not such large numbers of red supergiants.

== Examples ==
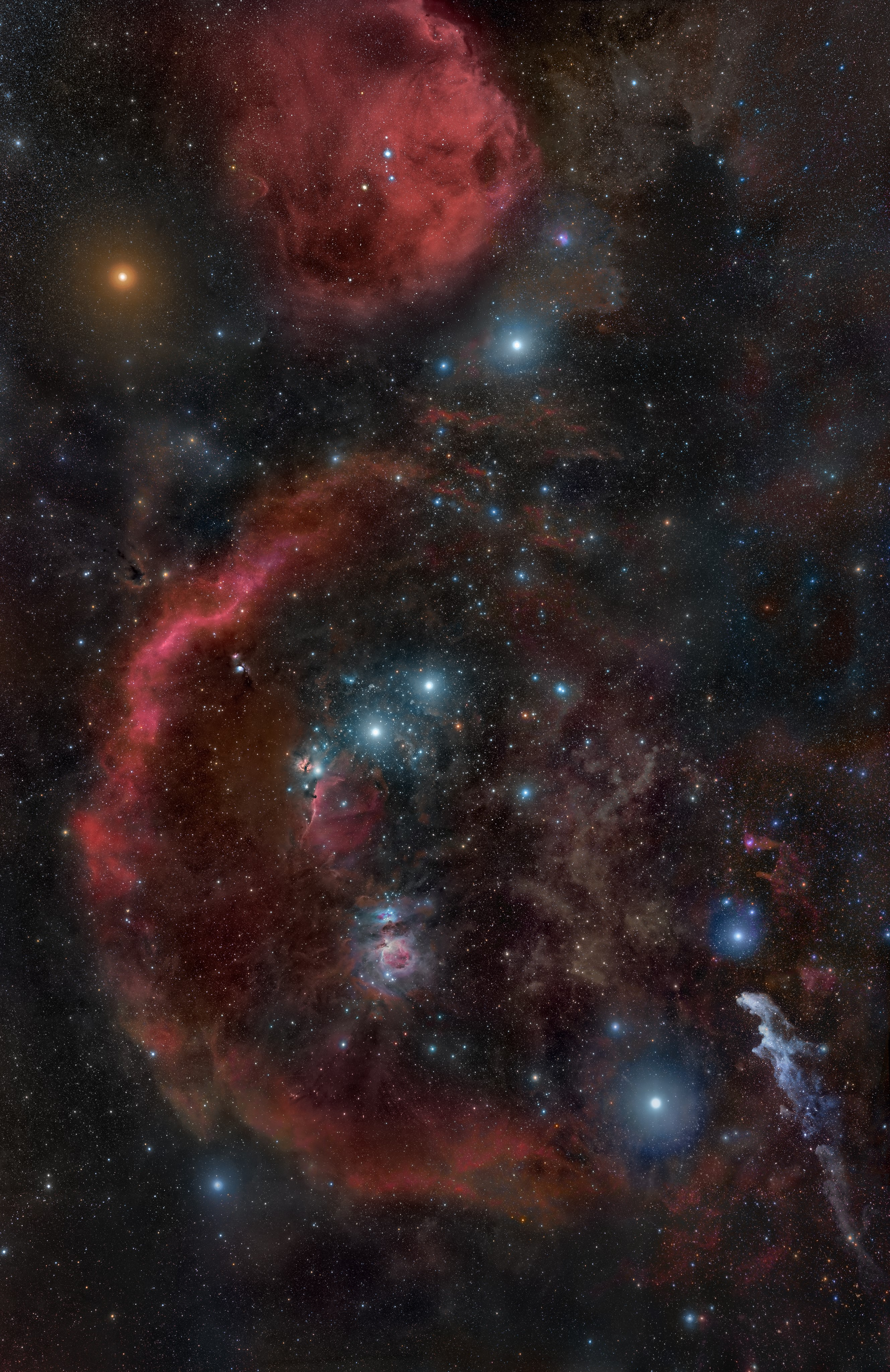
The Orion region showing the red supergiant Betelgeuse

Red supergiants are rare stars, but they are visible at great distance and are often variable so there are a number of well-known naked-eye examples:

- Antares A
- Betelgeuse
- Epsilon Pegasi
- Zeta Cephei
- Lambda Velorum
- Eta Persei
- 31 and 32 Cygni
- Psi^{1} Aurigae
- 119 Tauri

Mira was historically thought to be a red supergiant star, but is now widely accepted to be an asymptotic giant branch star.

Some red supergiants are larger and more luminous, with radii exceeding over a thousand times that of the Sun. These are hence also referred to as red hypergiants:

- Stephenson 2 DFK 1
- Mu Cephei
- VV Cephei A
- NML Cygni
- S Persei
- UY Scuti
- VY Canis Majoris
- Westerlund 1 W26
- WOH G64 A
- KY Cygni
- BI Cygni
- VX Sagittarii

A survey expected to capture virtually all Magellanic Cloud red supergiants detected around a dozen M class stars M_{v}−7 and brighter, around a quarter of a million times more luminous than the Sun, and from about 1,000 times the radius of the Sun upwards.

== See also ==
- List of supernovae
- Red dwarf
