= List of nearest hypergiants =

This is a list of the nearest hypergiant stars to Earth, located at a distance of up to 10,000 light-years (3,100 parsecs) from Earth.

While hypergiants are typically defined as stars with luminosity classes 0, Ia-0 or Ia+, other definitions exist, such as those based on stellar evolution. Therefore, stars with other luminosity classes can sometimes be considered hypergiants.

== List ==
Name	Distance (ly)	Spectral type	Stellar radius (R_{☉})	Stellar mass (M_{☉})	Stellar luminosity (L_{☉})	Apparent magnitude (V)	Notes and References
VV Cephei A	3319 – 4900	M2 Iab (M1p 0)	1050	2.5 or 18.2	72880±16300	4.91	
VY Canis Majoris	3820+260 −230	M3-M4.5 (M2.5-M5Iae)	1420±120	17±8	270000±40000	6.5-9.6	
HD 183143 (HT Sagittae)	4990±550	B6-8 Ia-0	109±15	24.2±1.4	288000+83000 −65000	6.71-6.95	
HD 168625 (V4030 Sagittarii)	5000±200	B6Ia+ (B2-B8)	105		380000	8.30-8.41	
VX Sagittarii	5100+360 −330	M4eIa-M10eIa	1456–1556	20–40	275000+114000 −52000	6.5-14.0	
HD 168607 (V4029 Sagittarii)	5100±500	B9Ia+	187		240000	8.12-8.29	
NML Cygni	5250+420 −360	M4.5–M7.9 Ia–III	1350+195 −229 (Note: Using an angular diameter of 7.8±0.64 milliarcseconds and a distance of 1610+130 −110 parsecs.)	25	229000+40000 −41000, 270000±50000	16.60	
RW Cygni	5,282 ± 130	M3-4Ia-Iab	1103+251 −177	20 M_{☉}	126,000	8.05 - 9.70	
P Cygni	5300±590	B1-2Ia-0ep (B1 lapeq)	76	37	610000	4.82	
Cygnus OB2-12	5300±590	B3-4Ia+	264	110	1660000	11.702	
V915 Scorpii	5600+570 −370	K0Ia-0	685.6	14.7	74100 – 185200	6.22 - 6.64	
Zeta¹ Scorpii	6000	B1.5Ia+	103 – 125.5	36 – 53	850000	4.705	
V382 Carinae	6000	G0-4-Ia+	485 ± 56	24±5.1	212000±12300	3.83	
HD 160529	6100	LBV	150 – 330	13	290,000	6.66	
HD 316285	6,200	B0Ieq	75	18.6	275,000	9.6	
V602 Carinae	7000	M3 Ia-Iab	1015	17.7 – 20	126000	8.39	
Eta Carinae A	7500	LBV	128 – 742	~100	4 000 000	–1 to 7.6	
S Persei	7900±300	M3 Iae–M7	1298+64 −57 – 1364±6	20	123000 – 186000	9.23	
6 Cassiopeiae	8000	A2.5Ia+	193	22.0	200000	5.34-5.45	
Rho Cassiopeiae	8150±1630	G2 0 (F8pIa-K0pIa-0)	700	40	300000 – 530000	4.1 to 6.2	
BP Crucis	9900	B1 Ia+	70	43	470000	10.83	

== See also ==
- Lists of stars
- List of nearest supergiants
- List of nearest giant stars
- Lists of astronomical objects
- List of nearest stars
