= Hypergiant =

Rare star with tremendous luminosity and high rates of mass loss by stellar winds

A hypergiant (luminosity class 0, Ia-0 or Ia^{+}) is a very rare type of star that has an extremely high luminosity, mass, size and mass loss because of its extreme stellar winds. The term hypergiant is defined as luminosity class 0 (zero) in the MKK system. However, this is rarely seen in literature or in published spectral classifications, except for specific well-defined groups such as the yellow hypergiants, RSG (red supergiants), or blue B(e) supergiants with emission spectra. More commonly, hypergiants are classed as Ia-0 or Ia^{+}, but red supergiants are rarely assigned these spectral classifications. Astronomers are interested in these stars because they relate to understanding stellar evolution, especially star formation, stability, and their expected demise as supernovae or hypernovae (For hypergiants 30–40 solar masses). Notable examples of hypergiants include the Pistol Star, a blue hypergiant located close to the Galactic Center and one of the most luminous stars known; Rho Cassiopeiae, a yellow hypergiant that is one of the brightest to the naked eye; and Mu Cephei (Garnet Star), one of the largest and brightest stars known.

== Origin and definition ==
In 1956, the astronomers Feast and Thackeray used the term super-supergiant (later changed into hypergiant) for stars with an absolute magnitude brighter than M_{V} = −7 (M_{Bol} will be larger for very cool and very hot stars, for example at least −9.7 for a B0 hypergiant). In 1971, Keenan suggested that the term would be used only for supergiants showing at least one broad emission component in Hα, indicating an extended stellar atmosphere or a relatively large mass loss rate. The Keenan criterion is the one most commonly used by scientists today; hence it is possible for a supergiant star to have a higher luminosity than a hypergiant of the same spectral class.

Hypergiants are expected to have a characteristic broadening and red-shifting of their spectral lines, producing a distinctive spectral shape known as a P Cygni profile. The use of hydrogen emission lines is not helpful for defining the coolest hypergiants, and these are largely classified by luminosity since mass loss is almost inevitable for the class.

== Formation ==
Comparison of (from left to right) the Pistol Star, Rho Cassiopeiae, Betelgeuse, and VY Canis Majoris superimposed on an outline of the Solar System. The blue half-ring centered near the left edge represents the orbit of Neptune, the outermost planet of the Solar System.

Stars with an initial mass above about 25 M_{☉} quickly move away from the main sequence and increase somewhat in luminosity to become blue supergiants. They cool and enlarge at approximately constant luminosity to become a red supergiant, then contract and increase in temperature as the outer layers are blown away. They may "bounce" backwards and forwards executing one or more "blue loops", still at a fairly steady luminosity, until they explode as a supernova, hypernova or completely shed their outer layers to become a Wolf–Rayet star. Stars with an initial mass above about 40 M_{☉} are simply too luminous to develop a stable extended atmosphere, and so they never cool sufficiently to become red supergiants. The most massive stars, especially rapidly rotating stars with enhanced convection and mixing, may skip these steps and move directly to the Wolf–Rayet stage.

This means that stars at the top of the Hertzsprung–Russell diagram where hypergiants are found may be newly evolved from the main sequence and still with high mass, or much more evolved post-red supergiant stars that have lost a significant fraction of their initial mass, and these objects cannot be distinguished simply on the basis of their luminosity and temperature. High-mass stars with a high proportion of remaining hydrogen are more stable, while older stars with lower masses and a higher proportion of heavy elements have less stable atmospheres due to increased radiation pressure and decreased gravitational attraction. These are thought to be the hypergiants, near the Eddington limit and rapidly losing mass.

The yellow hypergiants are thought to be generally post-red supergiant stars that have already lost most of their atmospheres and hydrogen. A few more stable high mass yellow supergiants with approximately the same luminosity are known and thought to be evolving towards the red supergiant phase, but these are rare as this is expected to be a rapid transition. Because yellow hypergiants are post-red supergiant stars, there is a fairly hard upper limit to their luminosity at around 500,000–750,000 L_{☉}, but blue hypergiants can be much more luminous, sometimes several million L_{☉}.

Almost all hypergiants exhibit variations in luminosity over time due to instabilities within their interiors, but these are small except for two distinct instability regions where luminous blue variables (LBVs) and yellow hypergiants are found. Because of their high masses, the lifetime of a hypergiant is very short in astronomical timescales: only a few million years compared to around 10 billion years for stars like the Sun. Hypergiants are only created in the largest and densest areas of star formation and because of their short lives, only a small number are known despite their extreme luminosity that allows them to be identified even in neighbouring galaxies. The time spent in some phases such as LBVs can be as short as a few thousand years.

== Stability ==
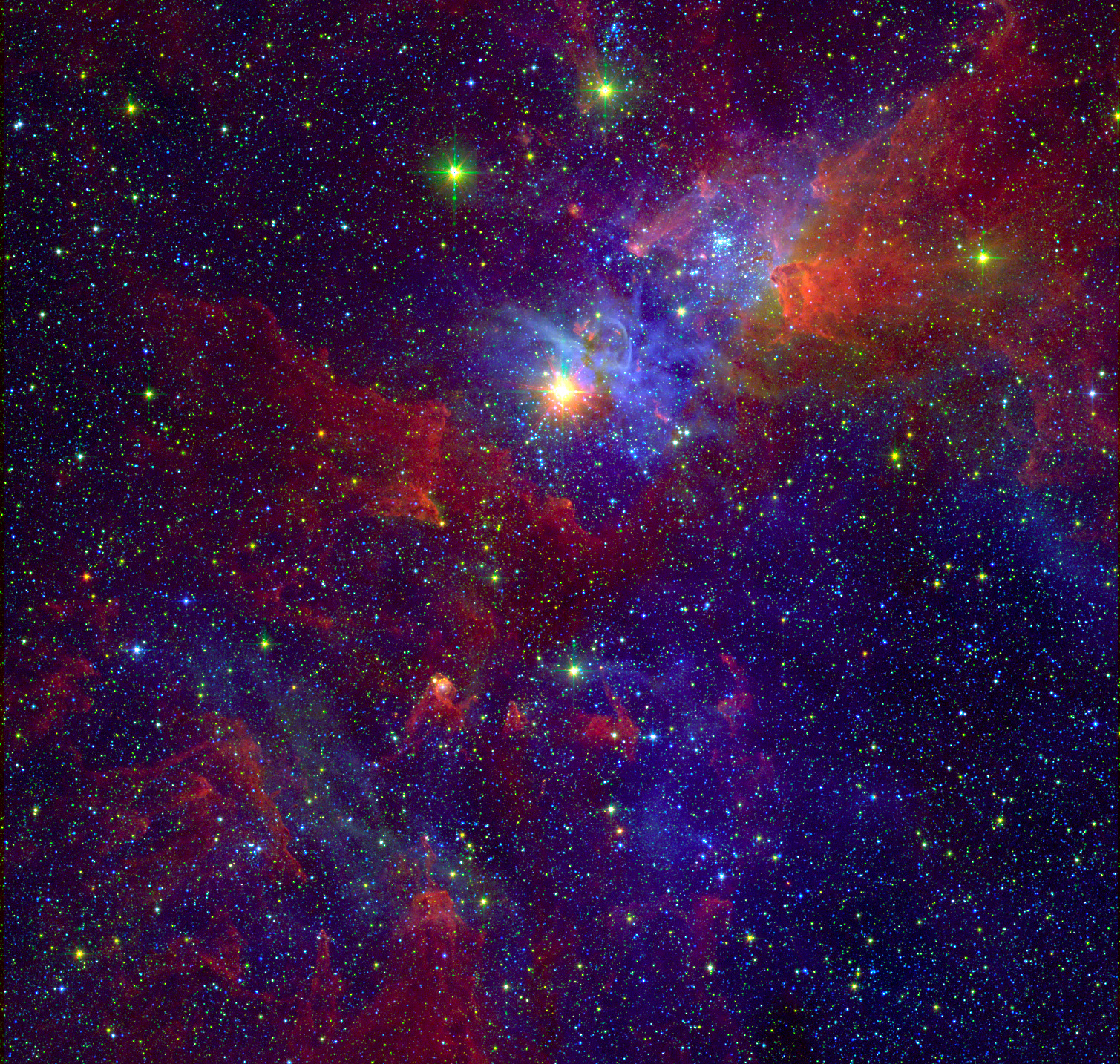
Great nebula in Carina, surrounding Eta Carinae

As the luminosity of stars increases greatly with mass, the luminosity of hypergiants often lies very close to the Eddington limit, which is the luminosity at which the radiation pressure expanding the star outward equals the force of the star's gravity collapsing the star inward. This means that the radiative flux passing through the photosphere of a hypergiant may be nearly strong enough to lift off the photosphere. Above the Eddington limit, the star would generate so much radiation that parts of its outer layers would be thrown off in massive outbursts; this would effectively restrict the star from shining at higher luminosities for longer periods.

A good candidate for hosting a continuum-driven wind is Eta Carinae, one of the most massive stars ever observed. With an estimated mass of around 130 solar masses and a luminosity four million times that of the Sun, astrophysicists speculate that Eta Carinae may occasionally exceed the Eddington limit. The last time might have been a series of outbursts observed in 1840–1860, reaching mass loss rates much higher than our current understanding of what stellar winds would allow.

As opposed to line-driven stellar winds (that is, ones driven by absorbing light from the star in huge numbers of narrow spectral lines), continuum driving does not require the presence of "metallic" atoms — atoms other than hydrogen and helium, which have few such lines — in the photosphere. This is important, since most massive stars also are very metal-poor, which means that the effect must work independently of the metallicity. In the same line of reasoning, the continuum driving may also contribute to an upper mass limit even for the first generation of stars right after the Big Bang, which did not contain any metals at all.

Another hypothesis to explain the massive outbursts of, for example, Eta Carinae is the idea of a deeply situated hydrodynamic explosion, blasting off parts of the star's outer layers. The idea is that the star, even at luminosities below the Eddington limit, would have insufficient heat convection in the inner layers, resulting in a density inversion potentially leading to a massive explosion. The hypothesis has, however, not been explored very much, and it is uncertain whether this really can happen.

Another hypothesis associated with hypergiant stars is the potential to form a pseudo-photosphere, that is a spherical optically dense surface that is actually formed by the stellar wind rather than being the true surface of the star. Such a pseudo-photosphere would be significantly cooler than the deeper surface below the outward-moving dense wind. This has been hypothesized to account for the "missing" intermediate-luminosity LBVs and the presence of yellow hypergiants at approximately the same luminosity and cooler temperatures. The yellow hypergiants are actually the LBVs having formed a pseudo-photosphere and so apparently having a lower temperature.

== Relationships with Ofpe, WNL, LBV, and other supergiant stars ==
Hypergiants are evolved, high luminosity, high-mass stars that occur in the same or similar regions of the Hertzsprung–Russell diagram as some stars with different classifications. It is not always clear whether the different classifications represent stars with different initial conditions, stars at different stages of an evolutionary track, or is just an artifact of our observations. Astrophysical models explaining the phenomena show many areas of agreement. Yet there are some distinctions that are not necessarily helpful in establishing relationships between different types of stars.

Although most supergiant stars are less luminous than hypergiants of similar temperature, a few fall within the same luminosity range. Ordinary supergiants compared to hypergiants often lack the strong hydrogen emissions whose broadened spectral lines indicate significant mass loss. Evolved lower mass supergiants do not return from the red supergiant phase, either exploding as supernovae or leaving behind a white dwarf.

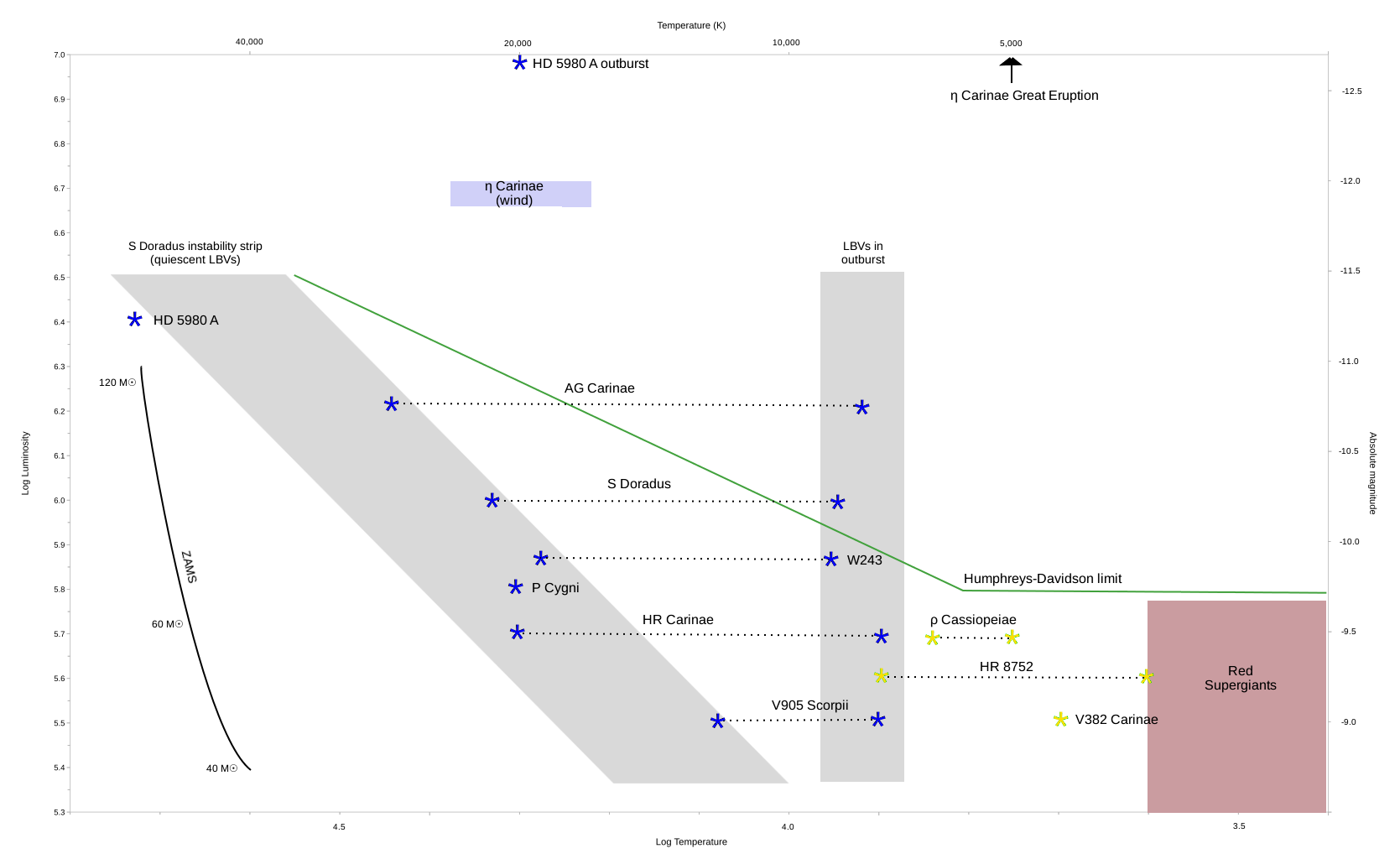
Upper portion of H-R Diagram showing the location of the S Doradus instability strip and the location of LBV outbursts. Main sequence is the thin sloping line on the lower left.

Luminous blue variables are a class of highly luminous hot stars that display characteristic spectral variation. They often lie in a "quiescent" zone with hotter stars generally being more luminous, but periodically undergo large surface eruptions and move to a narrow zone where stars of all luminosities have approximately the same temperature, around 8,000 K (13,940 °F; 7,730 °C). This "active" zone is near the hot edge of the unstable "void" where yellow hypergiants are found, with some overlap. It is not clear whether yellow hypergiants ever manage to get past the instability void to become LBVs or explode as a supernova.

Blue hypergiants are found in the same parts of the HR diagram as LBVs but do not necessarily show the LBV variations. Some but not all LBVs show the characteristics of hypergiant spectra at least some of the time, but many authors would exclude all LBVs from the hypergiant class and treat them separately. Blue hypergiants that do not show LBV characteristics may be progenitors of LBVs, or vice versa, or both. Lower mass LBVs may be a transitional stage to or from cool hypergiants or are different type of object.

Wolf–Rayet stars are extremely hot stars that have lost much or all of their outer layers. WNL is a term used for late stage (i.e. cooler) Wolf–Rayet stars with spectra dominated by nitrogen. Although these are generally thought to be the stage reached by hypergiant stars after sufficient mass loss, it is possible that a small group of hydrogen-rich WNL stars are actually progenitors of blue hypergiants or LBVs. These are the closely related Ofpe (O-type spectra plus H, He, and N emission lines, and other peculiarities) and WN9 (the coolest nitrogen Wolf–Rayet stars) which may be a brief intermediate stage between high mass main-sequence stars and hypergiants or LBVs. Quiescent LBVs have been observed with WNL spectra and apparent Ofpe/WNL stars have changed to show blue hypergiant spectra. High rotation rates cause massive stars to shed their atmospheres quickly and prevent the passage from main sequence to supergiant, so these directly become Wolf–Rayet stars. Wolf Rayet stars, slash stars, cool slash stars (aka WN10/11), Ofpe, Of^{+}, and Of^{*} stars are not considered hypergiants. Although they are luminous and often have strong emission lines, they have characteristic spectra of their own.

== Known hypergiants ==
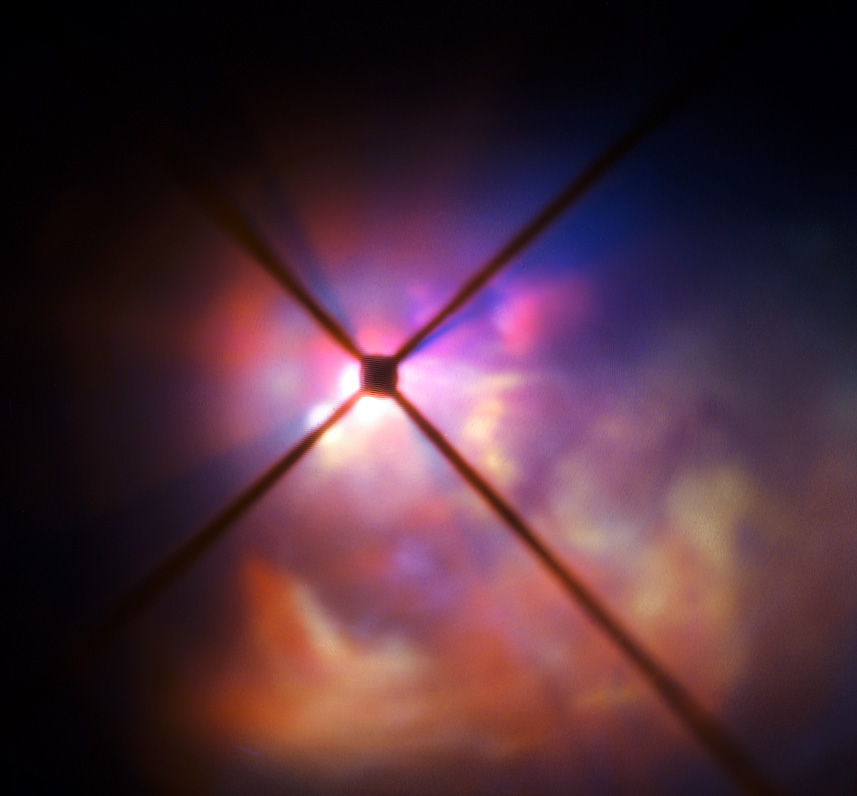
Very Large Telescope image of the surroundings of VY Canis Majoris

Hypergiants are difficult to study due to their rarity. Many hypergiants have highly variable spectra, but they are grouped here into broad spectral classes.

=== Luminous blue variables ===
Some luminous blue variables are classified as hypergiants, during at least part of their cycle of variation:

- AG Carinae, a massive Luminous blue variable and a part of the constellation Carina, which is transitioning from an O-type star to a Wolf-Rayet star.
- Eta Carinae, inside the Carina Nebula (NGC 3372) in the southern constellation of Carina. Eta Carinae is extremely massive, possibly as much as 120 to 150 times the mass of the Sun, and is four to five million times as luminous. Possibly a different type of object from the LBVs, or extreme for a LBV.
- HD 6884, (R40 in SMC)
- HD 269700, (R116 in the LMC)
- LBV 1806-20 in the 1806-20 cluster on the other side of the Milky Way.
- P Cygni, in the northern constellation of Cygnus. Prototype for the general characteristics of LBV spectral lines.
- Pistol Star (V4647 Sgr), near the center of the Milky Way, in the constellation of Sagittarius. The Pistol Star is over 25 times more massive than the Sun, and is about 1.7 million times more luminous. Considered a candidate LBV, but variability has not been confirmed.
- S Doradus, in the Large Magellanic Cloud, in the southern constellation of Dorado. Prototype variable, LBVs are still sometimes called S Doradus variables.
- V4029 Sagittarii
- V905 Scorpii

=== Blue hypergiants ===
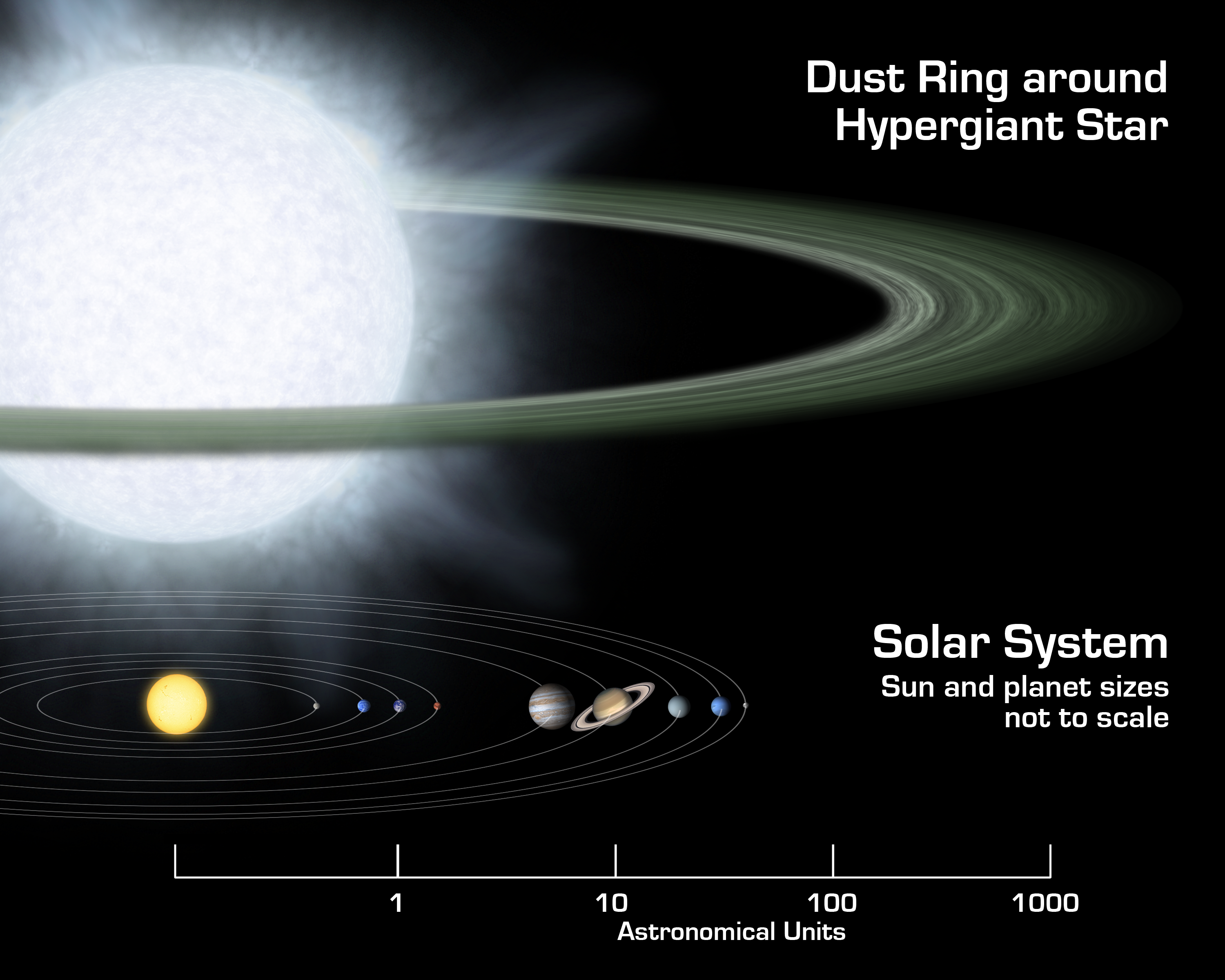
A hypergiant star and its proplyd proto-planetary disk compared to the size of the Solar System

Usually B-class, occasionally late O or early A:

- 2dFS 3235
- 6 Cassiopeiae
- AzV 2
- AzV 65
- AzV 76
- AzV 78
- AzV 367
- Barbá 2-2
- BP Crucis (Wray 977 or GX 301-2), binary with a pulsar companion.
- Cygnus OB2-12 (Note: Some authors consider Cygnus OB2-12 an LBV because of its extreme luminosity, although it has not shown the characteristic variability.)
- HD 5291 (Sk 56)
- HD 32034 (R62 in LMC)
- HD 37974 (R126 in LMC)
- HD 80077, LBV candidate
- HD 268835 (R66 in LMC)
- HD 269781 (in LMC)
- HD 269661 (R111 in LMC)
- HD 269604 (in LMC)
- HD 269896
- HDE 269128 (R81 in LMC), LBV candidate, eclipsing binary system.
- HT Sagittae
- M33 OB21 108
- MAC 1-277
- V430 Scuti
- V452 Scuti, LBV candidate
- V1429 Aquilae (= MWC 314), LBV candidate with a supergiant companion.
- V1768 Cygni
- V2140 Cygni
- V4030 Sagittarii
- Zeta¹ Scorpii (Note: Brightest star of the OB association Scorpius OB1 and a LBV candidate.)

In Galactic Center Region:

- Star 13, type O, LBV candidate
- Star 18, type O, LBV candidate

In Westerlund 1:

- W5 (possible Wolf–Rayet)
- W7
- W13 (binary?)
- W16a
- W27
- W30
- W33
- W42a

=== Yellow hypergiants ===
Yellow hypergiants typically have late A to G spectra. However, A-type hypergiants can also be called white hypergiants.

- AX Sagittarii (Note: May be instead a K-type or red supergiant.)
- HD 7583 (R45 in SMC)
- HD 33579 (in LMC)
- HD 74180
- HD 268757 (R59 in LMC)
- IRAS 17163-3907
- IRAS 18357-0604
- IRC+10420 (V1302 Aql)
- Omicron1 Centauri
- Phi Cassiopeiae
- R Puppis
- Rho Cassiopeiae
- RSGC1-F15
- V382 Carinae
- V399 Carinae
- V509 Cassiopeiae
- V810 Centauri A
- V1427 Aquilae (Note: May just be a closer post-AGB star.)
- Variable A (in M33)

In Westerlund 1:

- W4
- W8a
- W12a
- W16a
- W32
- W265

In the Sextans galaxy:

- Sextans A7

In the LS1 galaxy/globular cluster:

- Mothra

=== Orange hypergiants ===
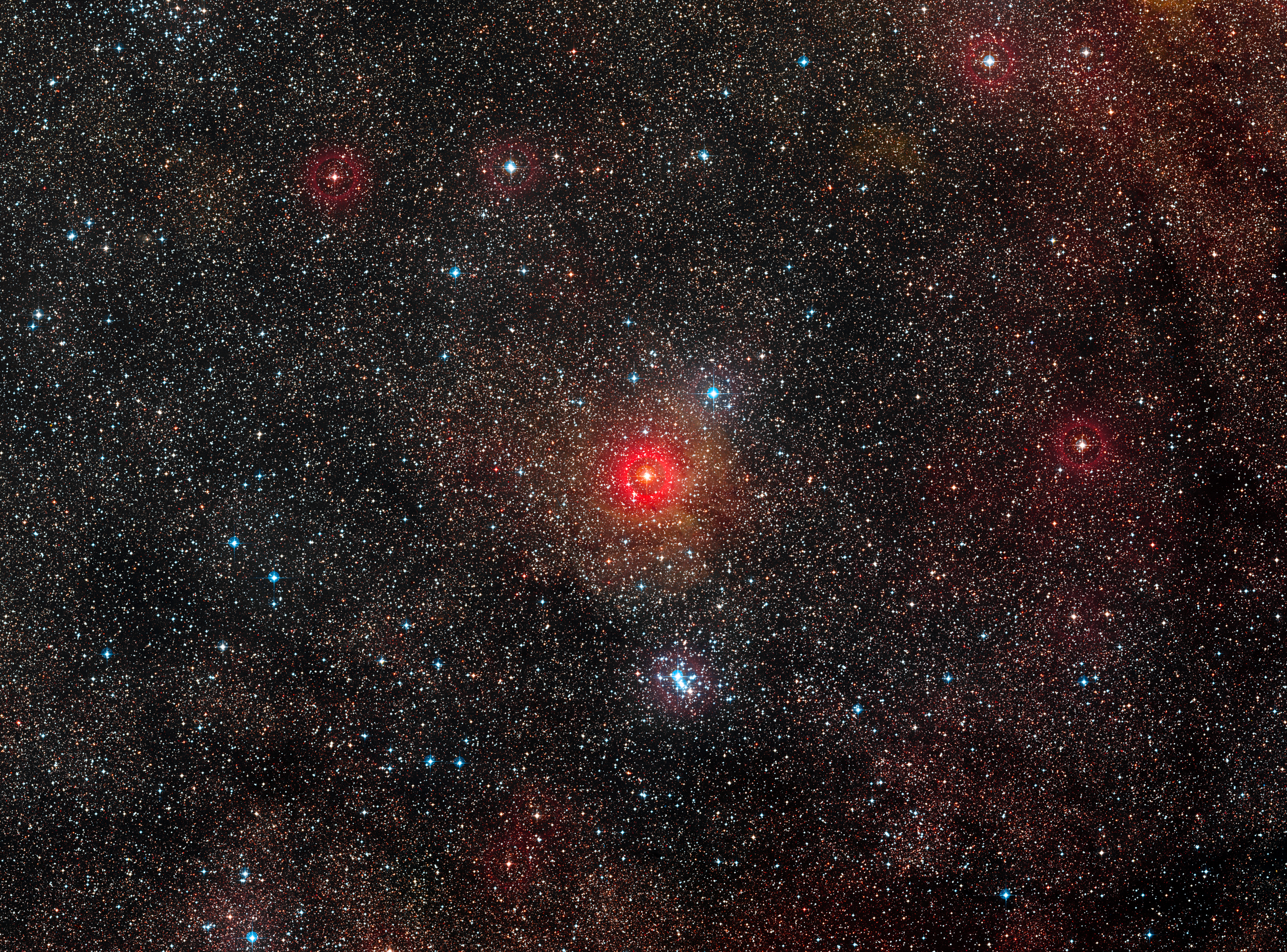
Field surrounding the orange hypergiant star HR 5171 A

Orange hypergiants are hypergiants with a spectral class of K. They can be classified as the cooler end of yellow hypergiant stars.

- HR 5171 A (V766 Cen A)
- MG 73-59 (in LMC)
- RSGC1-F13
- RW Cephei
- Sk-69-148 (in LMC)
- Stephenson 2 DFK 49
- V915 Scorpii

=== Red hypergiants ===
Size comparison between the diameter of the Sun and VY Canis Majoris, a hypergiant which is among the largest known stars (possibly the largest in the Milky Way).

M-type spectra, the largest known stars by radius. Hypergiant luminosity classes are rarely applied to red supergiants. However, the term red hypergiant is sometimes used for the most extended and unstable red supergiants, with radii on the order of 1,000 to 2,000 R_{☉}.

- AH Scorpii
- BC Cygni
- BI Cygni
- CK Carinae
- HD 143183
- KY Cygni
- KW Sagittarii
- Mu Cephei
- MY Cephei
- NML Cygni
- NR Vulpeculae
- PZ Cassiopeiae
- RT Carinae
- RW Cygni
- S Persei
- Stephenson 2 DFK 1 (Note: Maybe a foreground star or a field red supergiant unrelated to Stephenson 2.)
- UY Scuti
- V602 Carinae
- V1749 Cygni
- VV Cephei A
- VX Sagittarii
- VY Canis Majoris - potentially the largest star known in the Milky Way
- Westerlund 1 W26
- WOH G64 A (in LMC) - potentially the largest star known in the Large Magellanic Cloud and possibly the largest known overall

== See also ==
- Lists of astronomical objects
- Hypernova
- List of nearest hypergiants
