= List of nearest giant stars =

This is a list of the nearest giant stars to Earth, located at a distance of up to 100 light-years (31 parsecs) from Earth.

== List ==
Name	Distance (ly)	Spectral type	Stellar radius (R_{☉})	Stellar mass (M_{☉})	Apparent magnitude (V)	Notes
Pollux	33.78±0.09	K0 III	8.97±0.03	1.91±0.09	1.14	17th brightest star in the night sky and the nearest red giant
Arcturus	36.7±0.2	K1.5 III Fe−0.5	25.4±0.2	1.08±0.06	-0.05	Fourth-brightest star in the night sky, and the nearest red-giant branch star to Earth.
Capella A	42.919±0.049	G8III	11.98 ± 0.57	2.569±0.007	0.03	The nearest yellow giant, together with Capella A. With a magnitude of 0.08, the Capella star system is the 6th-brightest star in the night sky.
Capella B	42.919±0.049	G0III	8.83 ± 0.33	2.483±0.007	0.16	The nearest yellow giant, together with Capella B.
Errai (Gamma Cephei A)	44.98±0.09	K1III-IVCN1	4.74+0.03 −0.08	1.27+0.05 −0.07	3.21	
Caph (Beta Cassiopeiae)	54.7±0.3	F2 III	3.69 × 3.43	1.91 ± 0.02	2.28 (2.25–2.31)	The nearest F-type giant.
Chi Eridani	57.3±0.2	G8IIIb CNIV	4.0±0.03	1.58	3.70	
Menkent (Theta Centauri)	58.8±0.2	K0 III	10.77±0.45	1.27	2.06	
Epsilon Reticuli	60.1±0.1	K2III-IV	3.18±0.08	1.46±0.01	4.44	
Eta Serpentis	60.5±0.2	K0III-IV	5.897 ± 0.028	1.7±0.3	3.26	
Mothallah (Alpha Trianguli)	63.3±0.3	F5III	3.22	1.7	3.42	
Tureis (Rho Puppis)	63.5±0.2	F5IIkF2IImF5II	3.52±0.07	1.5±0.1	2.78 (2.68 – 2.87)	The nearest bright giant.
Larawag (Epsilon Scorpii)	63.7±0.3	K1 III	12.6 (Note: Calculated using an angular diameter of 5.99 mas.)	1.24	2.31 (2.24 – 2.35)	
Nu^{2} Canis Majoris	64.4±0.3	K1.5III-IVFe1	5.198±0.060	1.439±0.047	3.96	
Aldebaran	65.3±1	K5+III	45.1 ± 0.1	1.16 ± 0.07	0.86 (0.75 – 0.95)	14th brightest star in the night sky.
Hamal	65.8±0.3	K2-IIIbCa-1	15.19±0.10	1.5±0.2	2.00	49th brightest star in the night sky.
Unukalhai (Alpha Serpentis)	74.0±0.3	K2IIIbCN1	12.19	1.61	2.623	
Aljanah (Epsilon Cygni)	72.7±0.2	K0III	11.18	1.103±0.042	2.48	
Kaus Borealis (Lambda Sagittarii)	78.2±0.3	K1IIIb	12.692±0.181	1.79±0.20	2.82	
Cebalrai (Beta Ophiuchi)	81.8±0.3	K2IIICN0.5	12.17±0.06	1.75±0.14	2.749	
Alioth	82.6±0.4	A1III-IVpkB9	4.29+0.19 −0.21	2.91	1.77	33rd brightest star in the night sky.
Ankaa (Alpha Phoenicis)	85	K0.5IIIb	14.7 (Note: Calculated using an angular diameter of 5.25 mas.)	2.79 ± 0.14	2.377	
Seginus (Gamma Boötis)	86.8±0.3	A7 III or A7 IV+(n)	4.65	2.1	3.03 (3.02 – 3.07)	
Wazn (Beta Columbae)	87.2±0.3	K1III_CN+1	11.5 (Note: Calculated using an angular diameter of 3.99 mas.)	1.1±0.2	3.105	
Gacrux	88.6±0.4	M3.5III	73	1.5±0.3	1.64	The nearest M-type red giant, and the 25th brightest star in the night sky.
36 G. Doradus	89.1±0.2	K2III-IV	4.76±0.14	1.28±0.03	4.66	
Cursa (Beta Eridani)	90±0.9	A3 III var or A3 IV	3.14±0.18	2.55	2.796	
Delta Muscae	91±1	K2 III	8.6	1.5	3.61	
Kappa Ophiuchi	91.5±0.5	K2III	11	1.19 ± 0.14	3.20	
Athebyne (Eta Draconis)	92.1±0.2	G8 III	10.46–10.53	2.55±0.26	2.73	
37 Librae	94.3±0.6	K1III-IV	5.133±0.043	1.38±0.1	4.62	
Praecipua (46 Leonis Minoris)	94.9±0.6	K0+III-IV	8.21±0.05	1.09±0.04	3.83 (3.79 – 3.84)	
Diphda (Beta Ceti)	96.3±0.5	K0 III	17.5±0.9	3.5	2.02	
Altais (Delta Draconis)	97.4±0.3	G9III	10.52±0.24	1.70±0.18	3.07	
Alpha Indi	99.1±0.7	K0III-IV	9.89±0.21	2.15±0.13	3.11	

== See also ==
- Lists of stars
- List of nearest supergiants
- List of nearest hypergiants
