= R62 =

R62 may refer to:

- R62 (New York City Subway car)
- R62 (South Africa), a road
- HD 32034, a star
- HMS Cassandra (R62), a destroyer of the Royal Navy
- HMS Glory (R62), an aircraft carrier of the Royal Navy
- R62: Possible risk of impaired fertility, a risk phrase in chemistry
