= HR 5171 =

Star in the constellation Centaurus

V766 Centauri
- Location of HR 5171 (circled)

Observation data Epoch J2000.0 Equinox ICRS
- Constellation: Centaurus
- A
- Right ascension: 13^{h} 47^{m} 10.864^{s}
- Declination: −62° 35′ 22.95″
- Apparent magnitude (V): 6.1 – 7.5
- B
- Right ascension: 13^{h} 47^{m} 09.953^{s}
- Declination: −62° 35′ 15.99″
- Apparent magnitude (V): 9.83

Characteristics

A
- Spectral type: K0 0-Ia
- B−V color index: +2.499
- Variable type: EB + SDOR?

B
- Spectral type: B0 Ibp
- B−V color index: +0.39

Astrometry
Radial velocity (R_{v})	−38.20 km/s
Distance	9,630+300 −310 ly (2,953+92 −96 pc)

A
Proper motion (μ)	RA: −5.648 mas/yr Dec.: −1.797 mas/yr
Parallax (π)	0.2459±0.0514 mas
Distance	approx. 13,000 ly (approx. 4,100 pc)
Absolute magnitude (M_{V})	−9.2

B
Proper motion (μ)	RA: −5.715 mas/yr Dec.: −2.143 mas/yr
Parallax (π)	0.3257±0.0126 mas
Distance	10,000 ± 400 ly (3,100 ± 100 pc)
Absolute magnitude (M_{V})	−5.8

Orbit
Primary	Aa
Secondary	Ab (disputed)
Period (P)	1,304±6 days
Semi-major axis (a)	2,028 - 2,195 R_{☉}
Eccentricity (e)	0
Inclination (i)	>60°

Details

Aa
Mass	27 – 36 M_{☉}
Radius	1,315 – 1,575 R_{☉}
Luminosity	630,000+60,000 −55,000 L_{☉}
Surface gravity (log g)	−0.5±0.6 cgs
Temperature	4,290±760 K
Age	3.5 Myr

Ab (disputed)
Mass	5+15 −3 M_{☉}
Radius	312 – 401, 650±150 R_{☉}
Temperature	4,800 – 5,200 K

B
Radius	20 R_{☉}
Luminosity	160,000 L_{☉}
Surface gravity (log g)	3.0 – 3.5 cgs
Temperature	26,000 K
Age	4 Myr

Other designations
- V766 Cen, AAVSO 1340-62, CD−61°3988, HD 119796, HIP 67261, HR 5171, SAO 252448, WDS J13472-6235

Database references
SIMBAD	data

HR 5171, also known as V766 Centauri, is a multiple star system in the constellation Centaurus. The primary star is said to be either an extreme red supergiant (RSG) or recent post-red supergiant (Post-RSG) yellow hypergiant (YHG), both of which suggest it is one of the largest known stars. The star's diameter is uncertain but likely to be between 1,300 and 1,600 times that of the Sun. It is around 3 kiloparsecs (10,000 light-years) from Earth. It is a variable star, and when it is near its maximum brightness, magnitude 6.1, it is faintly visible to the naked eye under excellent observing conditions.

A 2014 publication hypothesized the star to be a contact binary, sharing a common envelope of material with a smaller yellow supergiant and secondary star, the two orbiting each other every 1,304±6 d. However, a 2019 publication ruled out this hypothesis.

An optical companion, HR 5171B, may or may not be at the same distance as the yellow hypergiant.

== System ==
Interferometric images showing the passage of the supposed companion in front of the primary

The HR 5171 system contains at least two stars, although they might not be associated. However, the primary A was thought an eclipsing binary (components Aa and Ab, or A and C in the Catalog of Components of Double and Multiple Stars) with two yellow stars in contact and orbiting in 1,304 days, although this might not be the case. The supposed companion has been detected directly by optical interferometry, and is approximately one third the size of the hypergiant primary. If the companion exists, the two stars are in the common envelope phase where material surrounding both stars rotates synchronously with the stars themselves.

Component B, located 9.4 arcseconds away from the primary, is a blue supergiant with the spectral type B0. It is a highly luminous massive star in itself, but visually three magnitudes fainter than the yellow hypergiant. The projected separation between the hypergiant primary and the blue supergiant is 35,000 AU, although their actual separation could be larger.

== Observational history ==
HR 5171 was named by inclusion in the Harvard Revised catalogue, later published as the Bright Star Catalogue. It was the 5171st entry in the catalogue, listed with a visual magnitude of 6.23 and K-type spectral type. HR 5171 was catalogued as a double star in 1927.

In 1956, HR 5171 was recorded at magnitude 6.4, spectral type G5p, and profoundly reddened. In 1966, Corben recorded it as magnitude 6.51 and spectral type G5p, and noted it as being variable. A 1969 catalogue records a visual magnitude of 5.85 and a spectral type of A7V, presumably a case of mistaken identity. In 1971, HR 5171 A was identified as a G8 hypergiant, reddened by over three magnitudes of interstellar extinction and also by half a magnitude of extinction from circumstellar material. In 1979, it was confirmed as one of the brightest known stars with an absolute visual magnitude (M_{V}) of −9.2. The G8 spectral type was later adjusted to K0 0-Ia in the revised MK system, meeting the criteria of highly luminous supergiants.

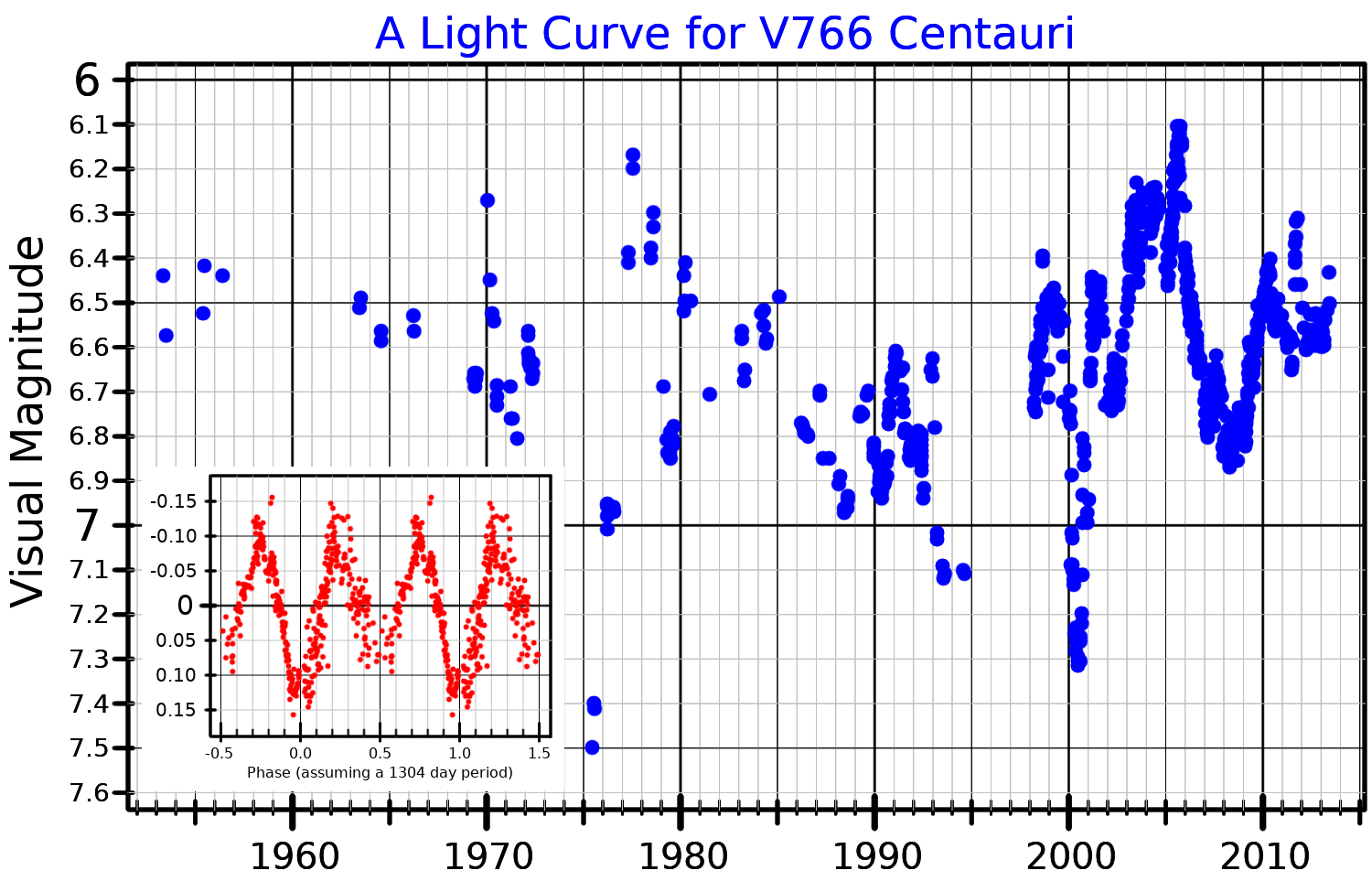
A visual band light curve for V766 Centauri. The main plot shows the long-term variability, and the inset plot shows the variation during the orbital period. Adapted from Chesneau et al. (2014)

In 1973 HR 5171 was formally recognised as variable star V766 Centauri, based on Corben's 1966 catalogue. At the time, it was considered a "cool S Doradus variable", a class including stars such as Rho Cassiopeiae that are now known as the yellow hypergiants. These variables are usually classified as semi-regular (SRd) due to variations that are sometimes well-defined, at other times nearly constant, and may show unpredictable fading. A detailed study showed variability in both brightness and spectral type with possible periods developing from 430 days to 494 days. Surface temperature was calculated to vary from nearly 5,000K to below 4,000K.

In a 2014 paper, VLTI observations directly determined an unexpectedly large size for HR 5171. The observations show the star has an asymmetrical shape, which was attributed to a secondary star in a contact binary system. A shell of material around the star has also been directly imaged. In 2016, VLTI observations showed an even larger radius and an unexpectedly cool temperature for a K0 hypergiant. Further interferometry imaged the secondary star transiting the primary. In 2019, a study cast severe doubt in the nature of the system as a contact binary; they suggest the irregular shape of HR 5171A is due to pulsations and the extremely low surface gravity of the star.

== Distance ==
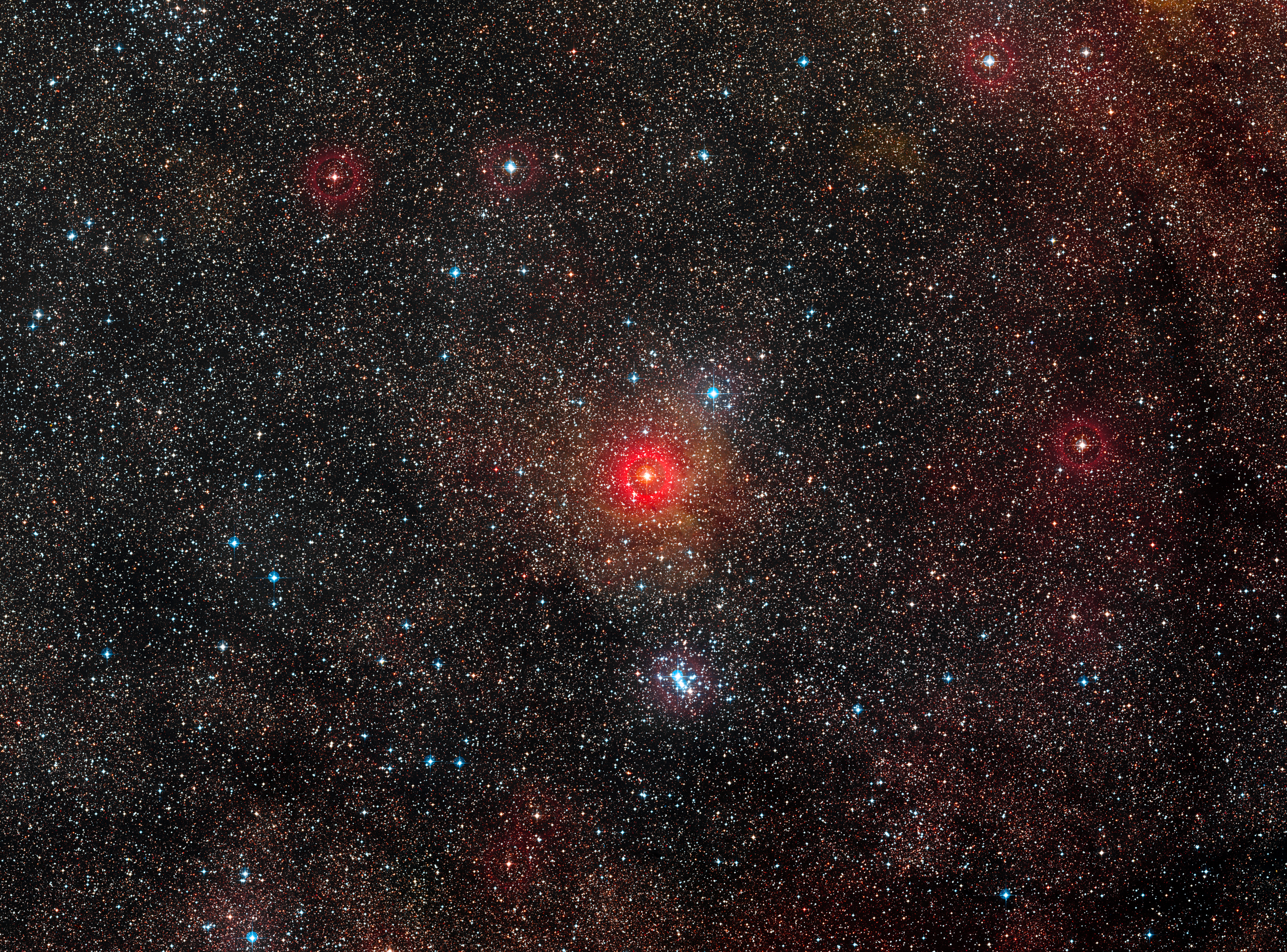
Combined optical and infrared image of HR 5171 (ESO/Digitized Sky Survey 2)

HR 5171 appears near the centre of the HII Region Gum 48d, a ring of material ionised most likely by one or both of the visible HR 5171 stars. The stars and the nebulosity all show similar space motions that would place them in the Centaurus spiral arm about 4,000 parsecs (4 kpc) away from Earth. It is apparently part of an extensive molecular cloud complex with a distance between 3.2 and 5.5 kpc from Earth. Gum 48d would require one or two O-type stars to be ionised, presumably one or both of the HR 5171 stars a few million years ago. Its age is calculated to be 3.5 million years, one of the oldest known HII regions.

Early calculations based on the assumed luminosity of HR 5171B gave a distance of 3.2 kpc and 3.2 magnitudes of interstellar extinction. Comparison of HR 5171A with similar stars in the Magellanic Clouds imply a distance of 3.7 kpc. An average distance based on all these calculations is 3.6 kpc, which is still the widely accepted distance although there are reasons to think it could be closer. One study argues that V766 Centauri Aa may be located at just 1.5±0.5 kpc from Earth, but the Gaia DR3 parallax is still consistent with Gum 48d membership, at around 4 kpc. Gaia parallaxes of neighbouring stars with similar proper motions are consistent with a distance of 2.95+0.09
−0.10 kpc, and as of 2026 the distance is considered to be between 2.9 and 3.6 kpc based on a variety of methods.

Gum 48d is also catalogued as RCW 80, although the designation RCW 80 is sometimes used for the more distant supernova remnant G309.2-00.6 which overlaps it. The open cluster NGC 5281 lies 19' from HR 5171, projected against the supernova remnant but only about 1,200 parsecs from Earth.

== Spectrum ==
The spectrum of HR 5171 is easily separated into a luminous yellow star and a hot blue supergiant. The third component, HR 5171Ab, is not resolved and its spectral type is uncertain. Both stars show 3-4 magnitudes of reddening due to dust extinction.

The yellow star has been defined as the spectral standard for K0 0-Ia stars. It shows the general features of a late G or early K supergiant, but with a number of peculiarities. High luminosity is indicated by the strength of the 421.5 nm CN break and the existence of the infrared oxygen triplet. It also shows a large infrared excess and exceptionally strong silicate absorption, both caused by a dust shell condensed out of material ejected from the star. An unusual blue excess near 383.8 nm may be due to polycyclic aromatic hydrocarbon (PAH) luminescence. The spectrum is strongly influenced by the extended atmosphere of the star, with strong emission lines formed in the stellar wind and the continuum forming in an extended region rather than at the sharp surface of a photosphere. The star effectively has a pseudo-photosphere hiding the true surface of the star.

The blue companion has been classified as B0 Ibp, a hot supergiant of normal luminosity, with some uncertainty. The spectral peculiarity code indicates that its absorption lines are less sharp than normal for a star of its type.

== Variability ==
HR 5171 shows erratic changes in brightness and colour. HR 5171B is apparently stable, with the changes being due to physical changes in the hypergiant star, variations in the envelope, and eclipses between the two close companions.

The primary and secondary minima have depths of 0.21 and 0.14 magnitudes respectively at visual wavelengths. The light curve shows almost continuous variation due to the contact nature of the system, but there is a distinct flat bottom to the secondary minimum where the secondary passes in front of the primary. The shape of the eclipse light curve suggests that the orbit is almost edge on to Earth, and that the secondary is slightly hotter than the primary.

The eclipses occur against a background of intrinsic variations. Statistically, the system has a mean magnitude of 6.54 and average variations of 0.23 magnitude over a period from the middle of the 20th century until 2013, but within this there are decades with relatively little variation and others which are much more active. Three deep minima have been observed, in 1975, 1993, and 2000, with the brightness dropping below 7th magnitude each time for around a year. Colour changes at these minima suggest a transfer of luminosity from the visual to the infrared, either as a result of cooling or recycling by the surrounding envelope. Following the deep minima, smaller brightness peaks are observed. Overall, the variability in brightness has been much stronger since 2000.

The variations in infrared brightness compared to visual brightness correspond quite well to the light curve, suggesting that brightness changes are related to colour or extinction changes, but there has been a secular trend in the B-V colour index. From 1942 until 1982, B-V steadily increased from around 1.8 to 2.6. Since then it has been approximately constant. This does not appear to be related to reddening as it is independent of the visual magnitude, so it suggests a change in the star itself. The most likely change is that the hypergiant has been cooling and increasing in size.

The variations are erratic, but a strong 657-day periodicity was noticed in Hipparcos photometry of HR 5171. More recent variations showed the strongest periodicity at around 3,300 days, but also showed other periods including one at 648 days. This persistent periodicity through all other variations is due to the eclipses twice every 1,304 days.

It is classified in the General Catalogue of Variable Stars as a possible S Doradus variable, as well as an eclipsing variable.

== Properties ==
The angular diameter of HR 5171A has been published three times using measurements from the Very Large Telescope, twice with the AMBER interferometer and once with the PIONIER interferometer. In all cases, an unexpectedly large diameter was found, between about 3.3 and 4.1 mas, well over 1,000 R_{☉} at the accepted distance of 3.6 kpc.

The earliest AMBER interferometry was at a range of infrared wavelengths in March 2012. The best-fit model was a sharply defined uniform disk with a small bright spot towards its edge, all surrounded by a fainter extended envelope. The uniform disk, taken to be the photosphere of the larger star, was 3.39 mas across, corresponding to a radius of 1,315 ± 260 solar radii (915,000,000 ± 181,000,000 km; 6.12 ± 1.21 au). The size of the smaller disk, assumed to be the secondary star, was not well-defined. The second set of AMBER observations were made in the K-band in April 2014. The best fits for a uniform disk and the Rosseland radius of a model atmosphere were almost identical at 3.87 mas and 3.86 mas respectively, corresponding to a radius of 1,492 ± 540 R_{☉} (6.94 ± 2.51 au). The PIONIER observations were made across six different infrared wavelengths during 2016 and 2017. Aperture synthesis was used to produce an image of HR 5171 at three different phases of the orbit. In two of the images, the secondary star is visible in front of the primary, and in the third it is expected to be behind the primary and was not visible. Modelled as a Rosseland stellar atmosphere surrounded by an extended uniform disk, the photosphere was found to be between 3.3 mas and 4.8 mas. Overall, the radius of the primary was calculated to be 1,575 ± 400 R_{☉} (7.32 ± 1.86 au) and 650 ± 150 R_{☉} (450,000,000 ± 100,000,000 km) for the secondary. The radii are statistically consistent with each other, but more representative of an extreme red supergiant rather than a yellow hypergiant. It is unclear whether this is due to binary interaction or misinterpretation of the unusual and highly reddened spectrum.

The luminosity has been calculated from spectral energy distribution (SED) fitting to be 630,000 L_{☉}, assuming a distance of 3.7 kpc and 3.2 magnitudes of interstellar extinction. This is considerably more luminous than expected for any red supergiant and extreme even for a yellow hypergiant. The effective temperature derived from matching infrared spectra is 5,000 K, while the temperature calculated from a radius of 1,490 R_{☉} and luminosity of 630,000 L_{☉} is 4,290±760 K.

The close secondary HR 5171 Ab is a luminous yellow star with a radius about a third that of the primary star and an almost identical temperature. From the shape of the eclipse light curve, it is 12% as luminous as the primary and slightly hotter. It is much less massive, estimated at only a tenth of the mass of the primary. Its exact properties can only be predicted from models since it is barely resolved from its larger companion and its spectrum cannot be distinguished.

The hot companion HR 5171 B is a B0 supergiant, 316,000 times as luminous as the Sun according to a 1992 paper. Although it is about half the bolometric luminosity of HR 5171A, it is three magnitudes fainter as much of its radiation is in the ultraviolet. Its distance of 3.6 kpc is well-determined and it is associated with the nebula and cluster Gum 48d, but it is uncertain whether HR 5171A is at the same distance or much closer.

== Evolution ==
The evolutionary history of HR 5171A is complicated by its uncertain and unusual physical properties and binary companion. As a single star with a temperature of 4,290 K, its properties correspond to a non-rotating star with an initial mass of 32 - 40 M_{☉}, or possibly a rotating star of initial mass 25 M_{☉}, which is several million years old and near its coolest temperature and largest size. Such stars are too massive to produce type II-P supernovae at the red supergiant stage and will evolve to higher temperatures, likely producing a different type of supernova explosion. With a temperature of 5,000 K, it would be a slightly more evolved star, having left the red supergiant phase. The primary star is probably undergoing wind roche lobe overflow (WRLOF) with a portion of the material being transferred to the secondary. This is a possible evolutionary path to a stripped-envelope Wolf-Rayet binary system. The interaction between the pair should spin up the primary to synchronous rotation, which is a possible path to fast-spinning luminous blue variables or B[e] stars.
