= NR Vulpeculae =

Star in the constellation Vulpecula

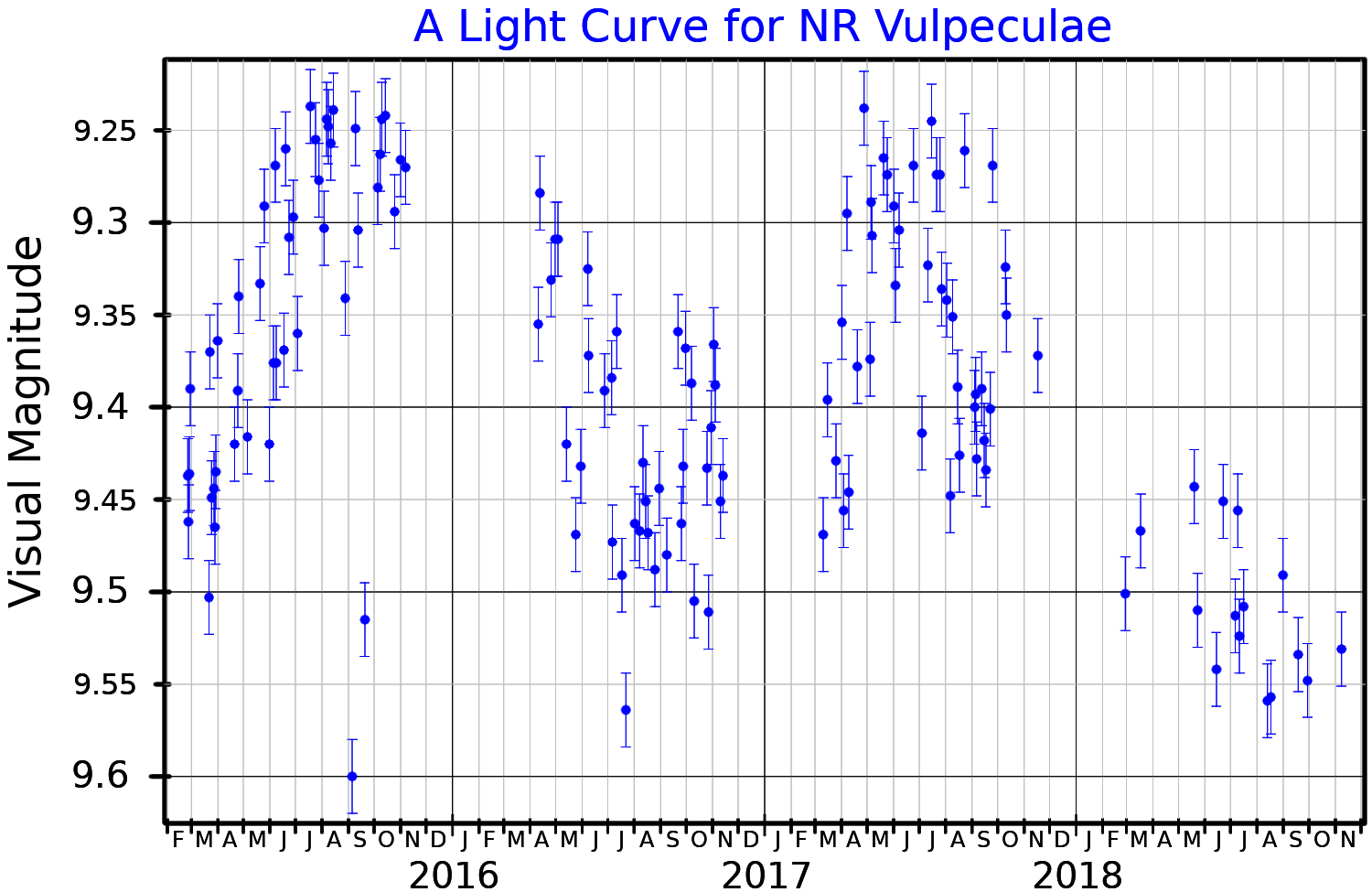
- The visual band light curve for NR Vulpeculae, plotted from ASAS-SN data

Observation data Epoch J2000 Equinox J2000
- Constellation: Vulpecula
- Right ascension: 19^{h} 50^{m} 11.928^{s}
- Declination: +24° 55′ 24.18″
- Apparent magnitude (V): 9.13 - 9.61

Characteristics
- Evolutionary stage: Red supergiant or hypergiant
- Spectral type: M1Ia or K3I
- Variable type: LC

Astrometry
Radial velocity (R_{v})	11.58±0.33 km/s
Proper motion (μ)	RA: −2.023±0.016 mas/yr Dec.: −6.024±0.023 mas/yr
Parallax (π)	0.3225±0.0251 mas
Distance	8,844+711 −538 ly (2,713+218 −165 pc)

Details
Mass	23 (Note: Calculated using the star's absolute bolometric magnitude of −8.63 in the following equation: log(M) = 0.50−0.1 • M_{bol}. This results in a mass logarithm of 1.363, and 10^{1.363} is equal to 23 solar masses.) M_{☉}
Radius	923+62 −50 R_{☉}
Luminosity	197,000 L_{☉}
Surface gravity (log g)	−0.20 cgs
Temperature	3,986 K
Metallicity [Fe/H]	+0.093 dex

Other designations
- NR Vulpeculae, TYC 2144-1244-1, GSC 02144-01244, IRC+20438, 2MASS J19501193+2455240, IRAS 19480+2447, AAVSO 1946+24, BD+24 3902, HD 339034, RAFGL 2462, UCAC2 40577951

Database references
SIMBAD	data

NR Vulpeculae is a red supergiant or hypergiant in the constellation Vulpecula. It is an irregular variable star with an apparent magnitude varying between 9.13 and 9.61, which is too faint to be seen to the naked eye.

== Characteristics ==
It has an spectral classification of M1Ia, meaning that it is a supergiant star of higher luminosity and spectral type M. Levesque et al. (2005) published a different spectral type of K3I, meaning that it is a K-type supergiant star. NR Vulpeculae has expanded to 920 times the Sun's size and is currently emitting 200,000 times its luminosity. If placed in the Solar System, its photosphere would reach beyond Mars' orbit. It has a cool surface temperature of around 4,000 K, giving it the typical orange color of a K-type star.

NR Vulpeculae is also a slow irregular variable, with an apparent magnitude ranging from 9.13 to 9.61.

It is considered a likely member of the Vulpecula OB1 stellar association.
