= HD 143183 =

Star in the constellation Norma

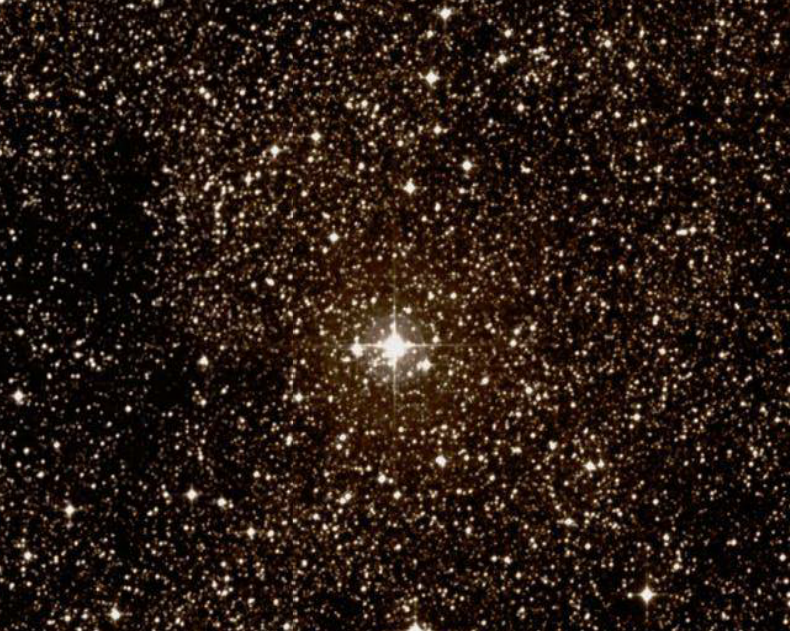
- HD 143183 (brightest star in the image) as seen from the Rutherfurd Observatory.

Observation data Epoch J2000 Equinox ICRS
- Constellation: Norma
- Right ascension: 16^{h} 01^{m} 22.2226^{s}
- Declination: −54° 08′ 35.607″
- Apparent magnitude (V): 7.3 - 8.6

Characteristics
- Evolutionary stage: Red supergiant or hypergiant
- Spectral type: M3 Ia or K2
- U−B color index: +0.75
- B−V color index: +2.10
- Variable type: LB

Astrometry
Radial velocity (R_{v})	−39.67±0.66 km/s
Proper motion (μ)	RA: −1.1 mas/yr Dec.: +13.1 mas/yr
Parallax (π)	0.5559±0.1021 mas
Distance	6,850±650 ly (2,100±200 pc)
Absolute magnitude (M_{V})	−7.5

Details
Mass	20 M_{☉}
Radius	1,261 R_{☉}
Luminosity	254,000 L_{☉}
Surface gravity (log g)	−0.6 cgs
Temperature	3,443 – 3,605 K

Other designations
- V558 Nor, CD−53 6947, HD 143183, IRAS 15576−5400, 2MASS J16013621−5408356

Database references
SIMBAD	data

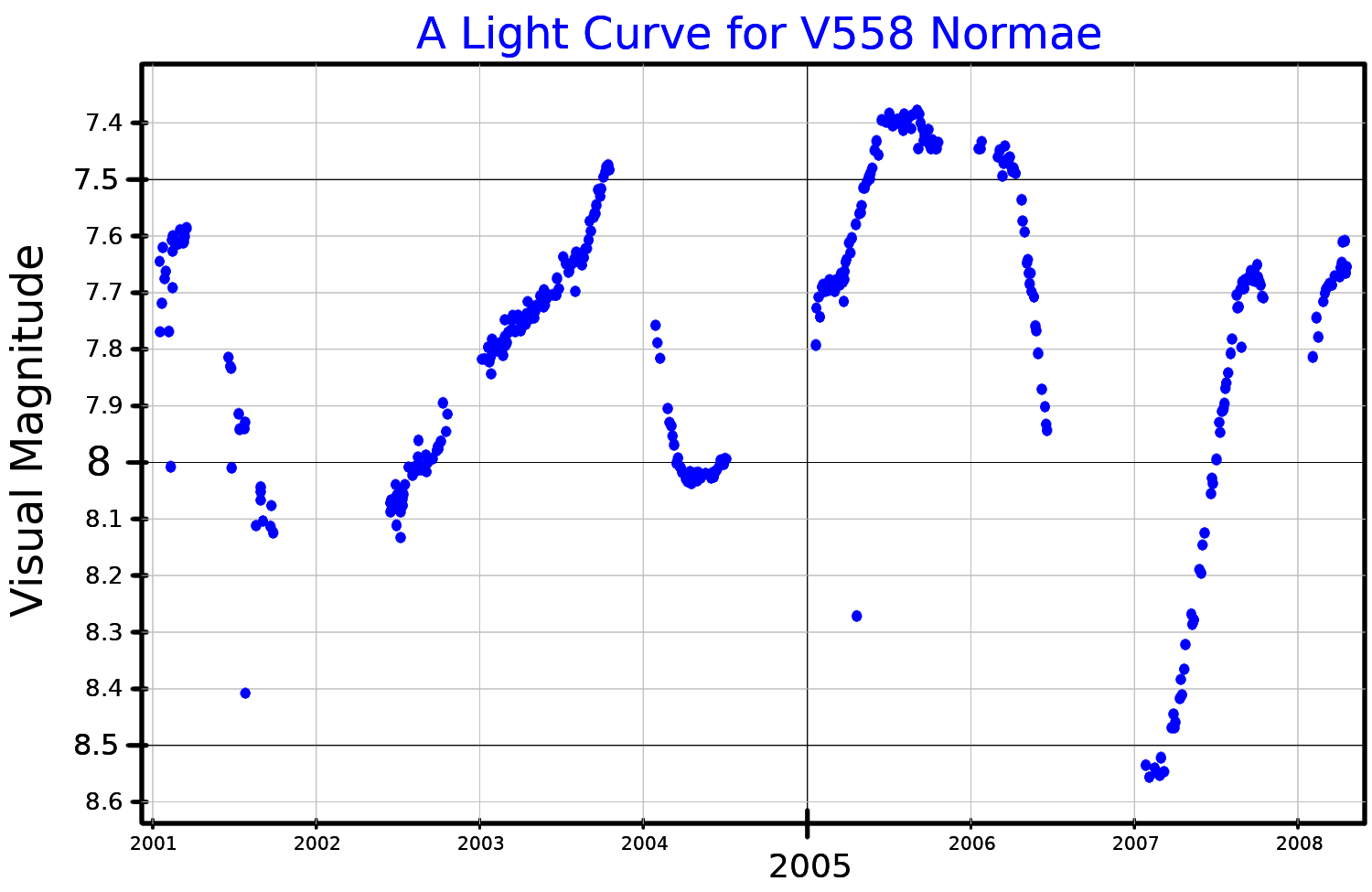
A visual band light curve for V558 Normae, plotted from ASAS data

HD 143183 is a red supergiant variable star of spectral type M3Ia or K2 in the constellation Norma. It is a member of the Norma OB1 association, at a distance of about 2 kiloparsecs. It is one of the most luminous red supergiants with a luminosity over 250,000 times greater than the Sun (L_{☉}), and is as well one of the largest stars with a radius more than a thousand times that of the Sun (R_{☉}). Older studies frequently calculated higher luminosities, which would correspond to larger radii. It has an estimated mass loss rate of 5×10^{−5} M_{☉} per year and has been once described as a cool hypergiant. It is surrounded by a dozen early-type stars and a circumstellar nebula which extends 0.12 parsecs (0.39 ly).

HD 143183 is catalogued with the variable star designation V558 Normae as its brightness varies irregularly between apparent magnitudes 7.3 and 8.6.

It is possible that HD 143183 is a spectroscopic binary with an OB+ companion, but this is considered doubtful. HD 143183 lies approximately 1' from the 10th-magnitude O-class bright giant CD−53 6363, the second-brightest star in the cluster.
