= BP Crucis =

Star in the constellation Crux

Observation data Epoch J2000.0 Equinox J2000.0 (ICRS)
- Constellation: Crux
- Right ascension: 12^{h} 26^{m} 37.561^{s}
- Declination: −62° 46′ 13.16″
- Apparent magnitude (V): 10.83

Characteristics
- Spectral type: B1 Ia^{+}
- U−B color index: +0.42
- B−V color index: +1.76
- Variable type: Ellipsoidal + X-ray

Astrometry
Parallax (π)	0.34±0.75 mas
Distance	3,040 pc
Absolute magnitude (M_{V})	−7.47

Orbit
Period (P)	41.498 days
Semi-major axis (a)	0.00029" (191.7 R_{☉})
Eccentricity (e)	0.462
Inclination (i)	60°

Details
Mass	43 M_{☉}
Radius	82 (Note: Calculated, using the Stefan-Boltzmann law and the star's effective temperature and luminosity, with respect to the solar nominal effective temperature of 5,772 K: $$\sqrt{\biggl(\frac{5,772}{18,100}\biggr)^4 \cdot 10^{5.81}} = 82\ R_\odot.$$) R_{☉}
Luminosity	646,000 L_{☉}
Surface gravity (log g)	2.38 cgs
Temperature	18,100 K
Rotational velocity (v sin i)	55 km/s

Other designations
- BP Cru, Hen 3-788, Wray 15-977, 2MASS J12263756−6246132, GX 301−2, AAVSO 1221-62

Database references
SIMBAD	data

BP Crucis (x-ray source GX 3012) is an X-ray binary system containing a blue hypergiant and a pulsar.

== System ==
BP Crucis is considered as the optical counterpart to the X-ray source GX 301−2. The system consists of a massive hypergiant star and a neutron star in an eccentric 41.5 day orbit. The distance is likely to be between three and four thousand parsecs. It is heavily reddened and has a K-band infrared magnitude of 5.72.−

There is a mass transfer from the hypergiant to the pulsar which occurs via a dense accretion disc. This produces a cyclotron effect with electron energies of 37 and 48 keV.

== Variability ==
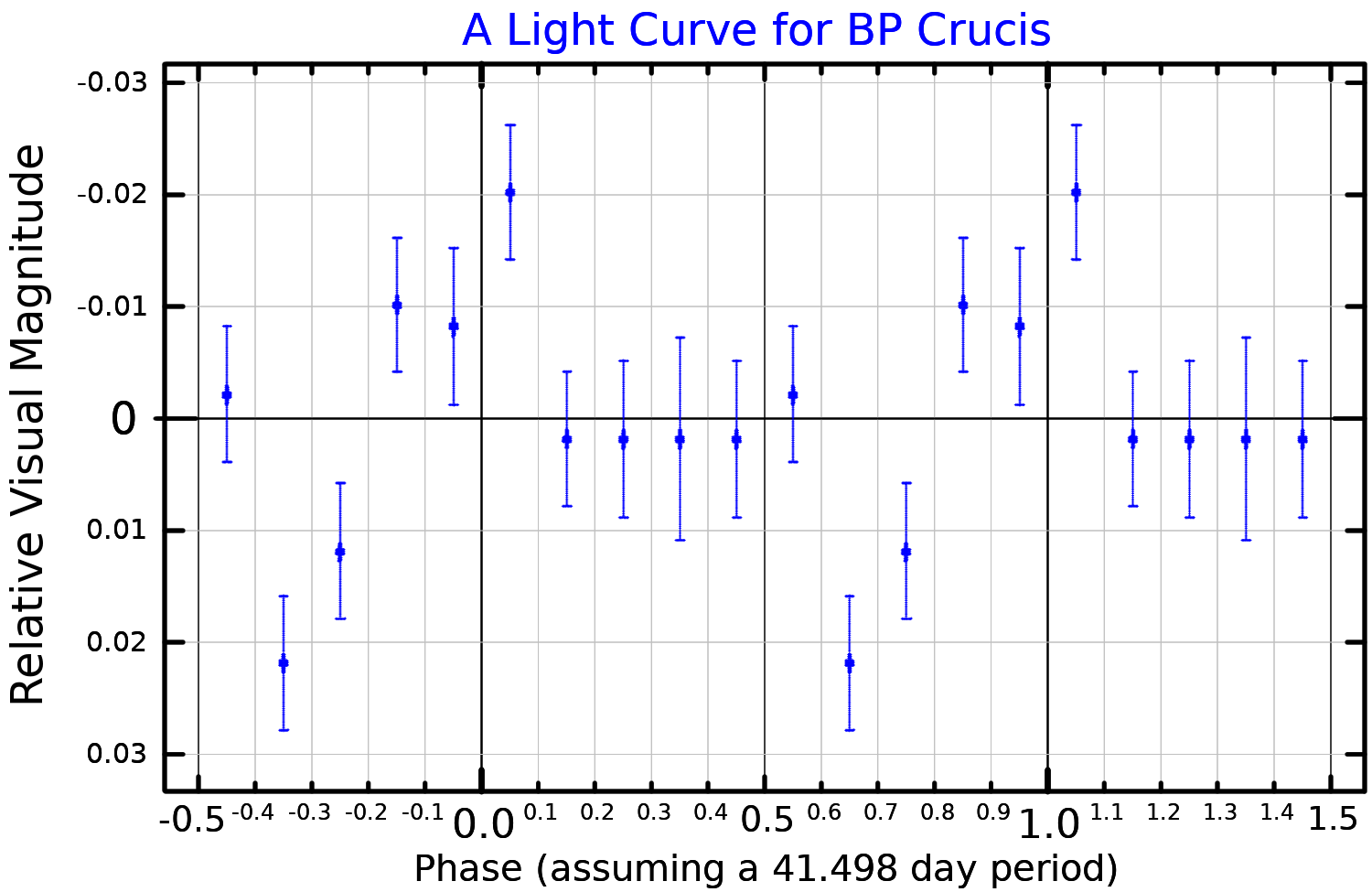
Visual V band light curve, 41.498 period

The system shows both optical and x-ray variability. Although no eclipses are observed, the x-ray luminosity varies during the orbit with large x-ray flares being observed during periastron passages. The system is an optical variable showing brightness changes of up to 0.08 magnitudes at visible wavelengths. These have been attributed to ellipsoidal variations as the hypergiant rotates and to α Cygni variability. There is an intrinsic pseudo-period of 11.9 days as well as small variations corresponding to the orbital period. That X-ray emission comes not from the neutron star itself, but rather represent a radiation re-emitted by optically thick accretion shell.

== Properties ==
BP Crucis is around 43 times as massive as the Sun, and has an estimated bolometric luminosity of around 676,000 times that of the Sun and a radius 82 times that of the Sun.

The neutron star appears to belong to the "high mass" variety being at least 1.85 M_{☉}. It is very likely to have a mass less than 2.5 M_{☉} as the theoretical maximum mass based on the equation of state for a neutron star. The pulsar has a spin period of 685 seconds, but shows relatively large spindown rates thought to be due to its strong magnetic field, and also occasional spinups due to interaction with the accretion disk. It is calculated that a slowly spinning neutron star could be spun up to the current rotation rate by accretion in only ten years.
