= V915 Scorpii =

Variable star in the constellation Scorpius

- Position of V915 Scorpii (circled)

Observation data Epoch J2000.0 Equinox ICRS
- Constellation: Scorpius
- Right ascension: 17^{h} 14^{m} 27.65508^{s}
- Declination: −39° 45′ 59.9378″
- Apparent magnitude (V): 6.22 - 6.64

Characteristics
- Evolutionary stage: K-type hypergiant
- Spectral type: K0Ia-0
- U−B color index: 2.48
- B−V color index: 2.21
- Variable type: SRd

Astrometry
Radial velocity (R_{v})	46.00 km/s
Proper motion (μ)	RA: −0.758 mas/yr Dec.: −1.466 mas/yr
Parallax (π)	0.5485±0.0525 mas
Distance	5600+570 −370 ly (1718+175 −115 pc)

Details
Mass	14.7 M_{☉}
Radius	685.6 R_{☉}
Luminosity	74,100 – 185,200 L_{☉}
Surface gravity (log g)	0.003 cgs
Temperature	4,573 K
Metallicity [Fe/H]	0.3491 dex

Other designations
- HR 6392, HD 155603, HIP 84332, CD−39°11212, IRAS 17109−3942, 2MASS J17142765−3945599, WDS J17145−3946

Database references
SIMBAD	data

V915 Scorpii (HR 6392, HD 155603) is a hypergiant and semiregular variable star, located 1,718 parsecs (5,600 ly) away in the constellation Scorpius. Its apparent magnitude varies between 6.22 and 6.64, being heavily diminished by 2.93 magnitudes due to interstellar extinction. When it is at its brightest, it is very faintly visible to the naked eye under excellent observing conditions.

== Surroundings ==
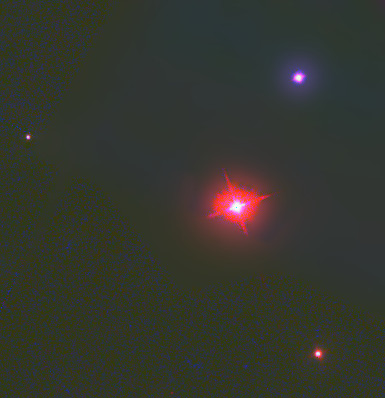
V915 Scorpii and its companions resolved by the Hubble Space Telescope

V915 Scorpii is surrounded by the sparse OB association Moffat 2. It is also surrounded by an envelope of dust and gas, producing a significant infrared excess.

V915 Scorpii has been classified as a triple star. 15" away is the Wolf-Rayet star WR 85, one of the most luminous stars known, but still visually four magnitudes fainter than V915 Scorpii. Component C is a 10th magnitude K class star 17" away. There is also a 14th magnitude star 22" away. Photometry and space motions suggest that only V915 Scorpii and WR 85 lie at the same distance, while the other two stars are foreground objects. Assumptions about the brightness of each star suggest a distance of 2,600 pc, and a projected separation of 0.2 pc.

Four arc minutes distant are two other assumed members of the association, a 10th magnitude B0 giant and an 11th magnitude OB star. Fitting the association members to a main sequence gives a highly uncertain distance of 1.8 kpc. A kinematical distance has been calculated for the bubble around WR 85 at 2.8 kpc. The distance to V915 Scorpii derived assuming minimal interstellar extinction is 7,300 pc. However, the star is considerably reddened and this results in a distance of 2,630 pc. Analysis of WR 85 as a luminous hydrogen-rich star gives a distance of 6,600 pc. Bailer-Jones et al. 2018 estimates a distance of 1,720 pc. The parallax for WR 85 is considerably reliable and suggests a distance of around 2,400 pc.

== Variability ==
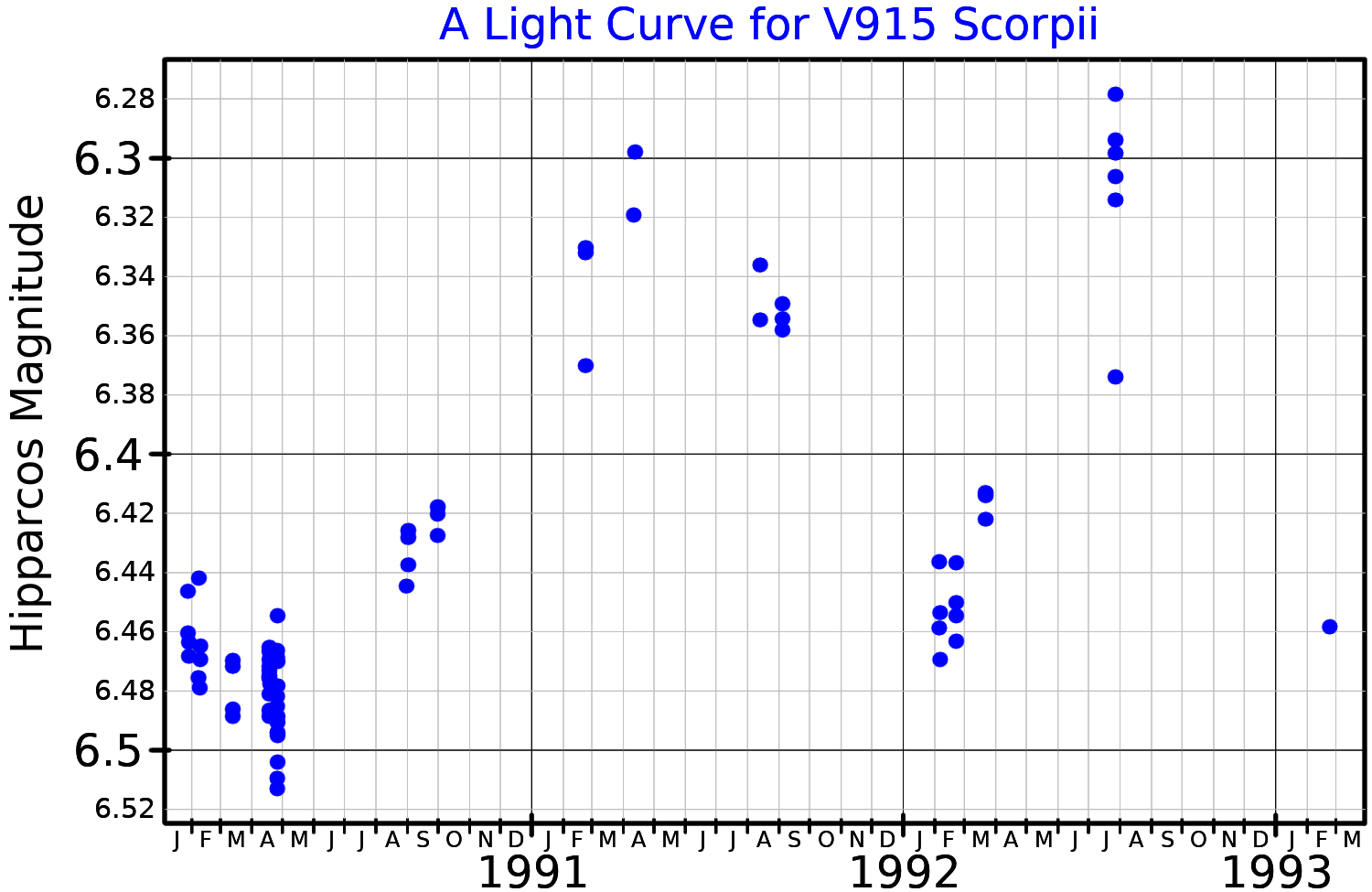
A light curve for V915 Scorpii, plotted from Hipparcos data

V915 Scorpii is classified as a semiregular variable, with an apparent magnitude that varies between 6.22 and 6.64. Any period associated with the variation is longer than 600 days.

The variability of V915 Scorpii was first announced by the Konkoly Observatory in 1979. It was given the variable-star designation V915 Scorpii in 1978.

== Properties ==
V915 Scorpii has a spectral classification of K0 Ia-0, meaning that it is a massive, hypergiant star. It has a mass estimated at 8.5 or 14.7 times the mass of the Sun, while its radius is of 690 R_{☉}, thus giving a volume equivalent to about 330 million times that of the Sun. V915 Scorpii is radiating a luminosity equivalent to 74,000 or 185,000 times the solar luminosity and has a surface effective temperature of 4,600 K, giving it the typical orange color of a K-type star.

The spectral type of V915 Scorpii was determined to be G5Ia in 1954, G5Ia-0 in 1973, G8Ia in 1977, K0Ia in 1982, and K0Ia-0 in 1989, all indicative of a luminous supergiant or hypergiant.

== See also ==
- List of largest stars
