= List of nearest supergiants =

This is a list of the nearest supergiant stars to Earth, located at a distance of up to 1,100 light-years (340 parsecs). Some of the brightest stars in the night sky, such as Rigel and Antares, are in the list.

While supergiants are typically defined as stars with luminosity classes Ia, Iab or Ib, other definitions exist, such as those based on stellar evolution. Therefore, stars with other luminosity classes can sometimes be considered supergiants.

== List ==
Name	Distance (ly)	Spectral type	Stellar radius (R_{☉})	Stellar mass (M_{☉})	Stellar luminosity (L_{☉})	Apparent magnitude (V)	Notes
Canopus	309	A9II	73.3±5.2	9.81±1.83	16,600+700 −680	−0.74	While it is frequently described as a yellow supergiant, especially in evolutionary terms, it is classified as a bright giant based on spectrum.
Rasalgethi (α Herculis Aa)	360	M5 Ib-II	284±60	2.5	7,244–9,433	3.35	In evolutionary terms, it is an asymptotic giant branch star.
Rastaban (β Draconis)	380±4	G2Ib-IIa	41.4 ± 2.4 or 46.5 ± 2.7 (Note: Applying the Stefan–Boltzmann law with a nominal solar effective temperature of 5,772 K: $\sqrt{\biggl(\frac{5,772}{5,250}\biggr)^4 \cdot 10^{3.07}} = 41.4\ R_\odot$$\sqrt{\biggl(\frac{5,772}{5,250}\biggr)^4 \cdot 10^{3.17}} = 46.4\ R_\odot$.)	6±0.2	1,170–1,480	2.79	
Betelgeuse	408–548+90 −49	M1-M2Ia-ab	640 – 764+116 −62	14 – 19	87,100+20,500 −11,200	0.5 (0.0 – 1.6)	The nearest non-disputed (uncontroversial) red supergiant, and the 10th brightest star in the night sky.
Atria (α Trianguli Australis)	420±32	K2Ib-IIa	143 (Note: Applying the Stefan–Boltzmann law with a nominal solar effective temperature of 5,772 K: $$\sqrt{(5772/4,150)^4 * 5,500} = 143.46\ R\odot$$)	7	5,500	1.91	
ζ Capricorni	442±16	G4Ib: Ba2	31±2	4.5+0.3 −0.2	561+180 −143	3.77	
Polaris	447±1	F7Ib-F8Ib	46.27±0.42	5.13±0.28	1,260	1.98 (1.86 – 2.13)	
Mirfak (α Persei)	510±10	F5Ib	51.1±1.3	6–7	4,018±53	1.806	35th brightest star in the night sky.
Sadalsuud (β Aquarii)	542+18 −16	G0Ib	47.88+1.68 −1.81	6.4±0.3	2,046±180	2.87	
Suhail (λ Velorum)	545±10	K4Ib	211±6	7.0+1.5 −1.1	8,300	2.21 (2.14 – 2.30)	Likely an AGB star.
Antares	554±94	M1.5Iab-Ib	680	11 – 16	75,900+53,000 −31,200	0.6 – 1.6	15th brightest star in the night sky.
κ Pavonis	590±30	F5-G5 I-II	22.8±1.1	0.56±0.08	565	4.35 (3.91 - 4.78)	
Saiph	650±30	B0.5Ia	14	15.5±1.25	60,300+10,500 −9,000	2.09	The closest blue supergiant.
Enif (ε Pegasi)	690±20	K2Ib-II	183+6 −7	11 – 12	8,508±596	2.399 (2.37 – 2.45)	
Sadalmelik (α Aquarii)	691+38 −56	G2Ib	70 (Note: Using Alpha Aquarii's measured angular diameter at 3.066±0.036 milliarcseconds (mas), together with its distance to Earth of 211.9 parsecs (or 691 light-years), its physical size can be calculated. It is divided by 0.0046491 to convert to AU from 2 R_{☉}, and the given value is divided by 2 to convert to the Sun's radius.)	6.5±0.3	3,000	2.942	
β Arae	714+39 −34	K3Ib-II	141.4±6.6	8.21	5,774±535	2.84	
ζ Persei	750±30 to 1,300±200	B1Ib	16.7 (Note: Applying the Stefan–Boltzmann law with a nominal solar effective temperature of 5,772 K: $$\sqrt{\biggl(\frac{5,772}{20,800}\biggr)^4 \cdot 47,039} = 16.7\ R_\odot$$.) to 26.1	14.5±1.9	47,000	2.86	
Aspidiske (ι Carinae)	770±20	A7Ib	46.4–50.1	6.9	4,900	2.21	
Ahadi (π Puppis)	810±70	K3Ib	235	11.7	11,380	2.733	
Rigel	848±65	B8Ia	74.1+6.1 −7.3	21±3	120,000+25,000 −21,000	0.13 (0.05 – 0.18)	7th brightest star in the night sky.
χ Aquilae	854±114	G8Ib	23.3		443	5.8	
Saclateni A (ζ Aurigae)	860±10	K5Ib	148±3	5.8±0.2	4,786	3.751 (3.70 – 3.97)	Sometimes considered a red supergiant; possible bright giant
Mebsuta (ε Geminorum)	861+52 −39	G8Ib	130.2+5.5 −6	8.2±0.8	6,980	3.06	
β Camelopardalis	870±50	G1Ib–IIa	58±13	6.5±0.4	1,530+300 −250	4.02	
η Aquilae A (Pagru)	885.8+41.7 −45.0, 1010±33	F6Ib–G4Ib	59±2	5.7	3,368±195	3.48 – 4.33	
δ Cephei A	887±26	F5Ib-G1Ib	46.07+1.9 −2.1	5.26+1.26 −1.40	1,949±107	3.48 – 4.37	Prototype of the Classical Cepheid variable stars.
ζ Cephei	993+51 −46	K1.5Ib	172.7+7.5 −8.3	10.1±0.1	10,024±1,052	3.35	
Miram (η Persei)	1,000±60	K3Ib	173.1+9.69 −10.8	8±0.4	7,508±864	3.79	
β Doradus	1,040±50 – 1,140±13	F4-G4Ia-II	67.8±0.7	7.7±0.2	3,200	3.46 – 4.08	
Naos (ζ Puppis)	1,080±40	O4If(n)p	13.5±0.2	25.3±5.3	446,700+66,200 −57,600	2.24 – 2.26	

== See also ==
- Lists of stars
- List of nearest hypergiants
