= NGC 5281 =

Open cluster in the constellation Centaurus

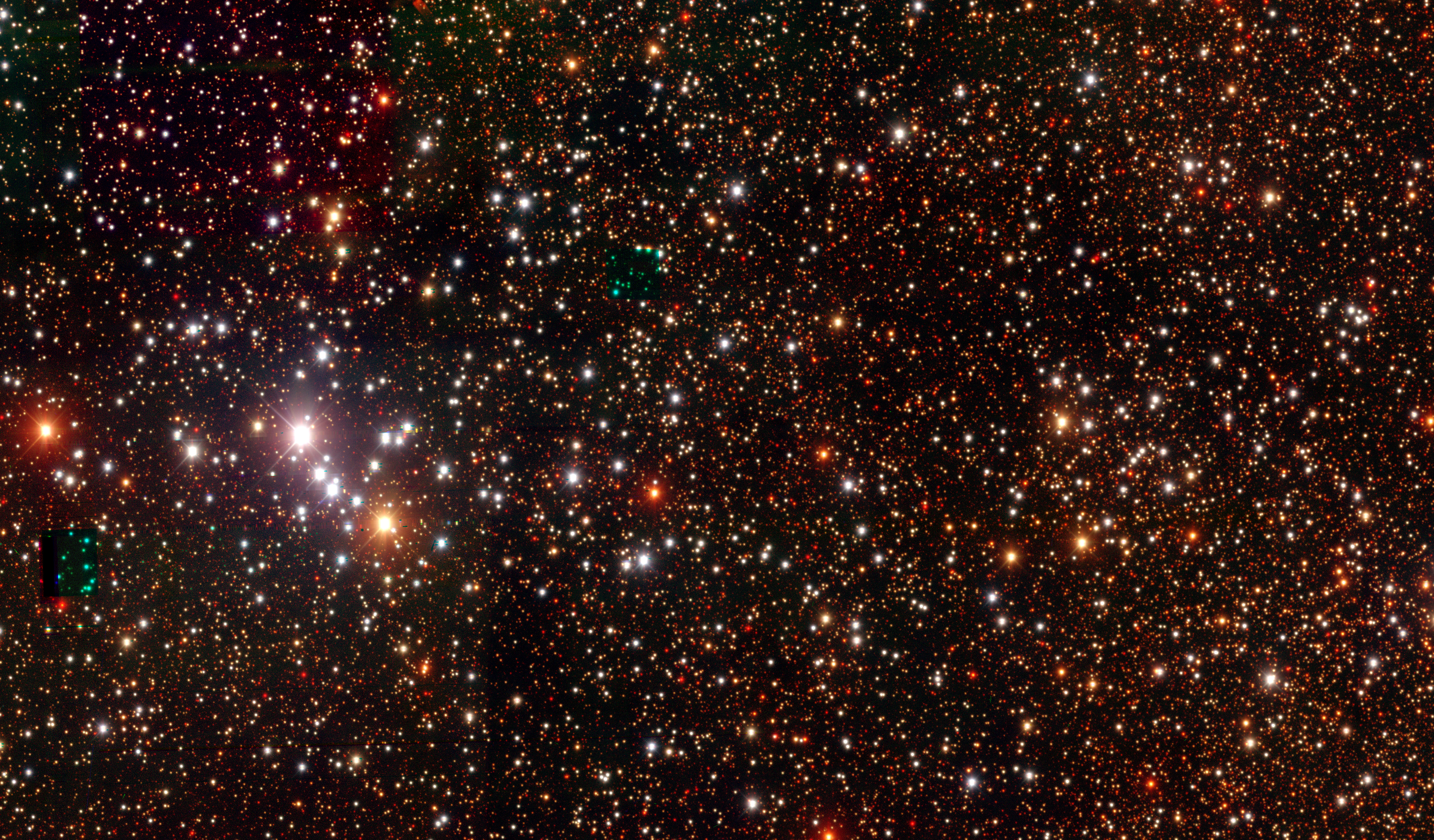
- NGC 5269 (right) and NGC 5281 (left); Credit: legacy surveys

Observation data (J2000 epoch)
- Right ascension: 13^{h} 46^{m} 35^{s}
- Declination: −62° 55′ 00″
- Distance: 4,200 ly (1,300 pc)
- Apparent magnitude (V): 5.9
- Apparent dimensions (V): 7'

Physical characteristics
- Estimated age: 45 million years
- Other designations: vdBH 152, Collinder 276, Melotte 120

Associations
- Constellation: Centaurus

NGC 5281 is an open cluster in the constellation Centaurus. It was discovered by Nicolas Louis de Lacaille in 1751-1752 from South Africa, and catalogued it as Lacaille I.7. NGC 5281 is located three and a quarter degrees southwest of Beta Centauri. Under dark skies, it is bright enough to be spotted with naked eye, appearing as a 6th magnitude star.

== Characteristics ==
The four bright stars of the cluster form a striking line as seen from Earth, however the cluster is sparsely populated. The brightest member of the cluster is of mag 6.61. The next two brighter stars have evolved away from main sequence. The turn-off mass of the cluster is estimated to be at 5.6 M_{☉}. Based on the colour magnitude diagram, the age of the cluster is estimated to be 45 myrs. The tidal radius of the cluster is 5.5 - 8.4 parsecs (18 - 27 light years) and represents the average outer limit of NGC 5281, beyond which a star is unlikely to remain gravitationally bound to the cluster core. The radius of the core of the cluster is about 4.3 light years, nearly the same as the distance between the Sun and the closest star system, Alpha Centauri. Within the angular radius of the cluster there are 371 probable members.

One of the members of the cluster is HD 119682 (mag. 7.97, spectral type B0.5V), a Be star notable for its X-rays emission. It has been categorised by Moffat & Vogt (1973), Mermilliod (1982), and Safi-Harb (2007), as a blue straggler, and it has also been categorised as a gamma Cassiopeiae analog. HD 119682 has been identified as the visual counterpart of the X-ray source 1WGA J1346.5-6255, found within the radio lobes of the supernova remnant G309.2-00.6, located 4 ± 2 kpc away, with which it is unrelated. The light curve of the star in X-rays shows significant brightness variations within hours, however, the spectral distribution appears rather stable. The spectrum obtained by the High Energy Transmission Gratings on board Chandra X-ray Observatory seems to lack strong emission lines, including Fe Kα fluorescence.
