= VV Cephei =

Binary star in the constellation Cepheus

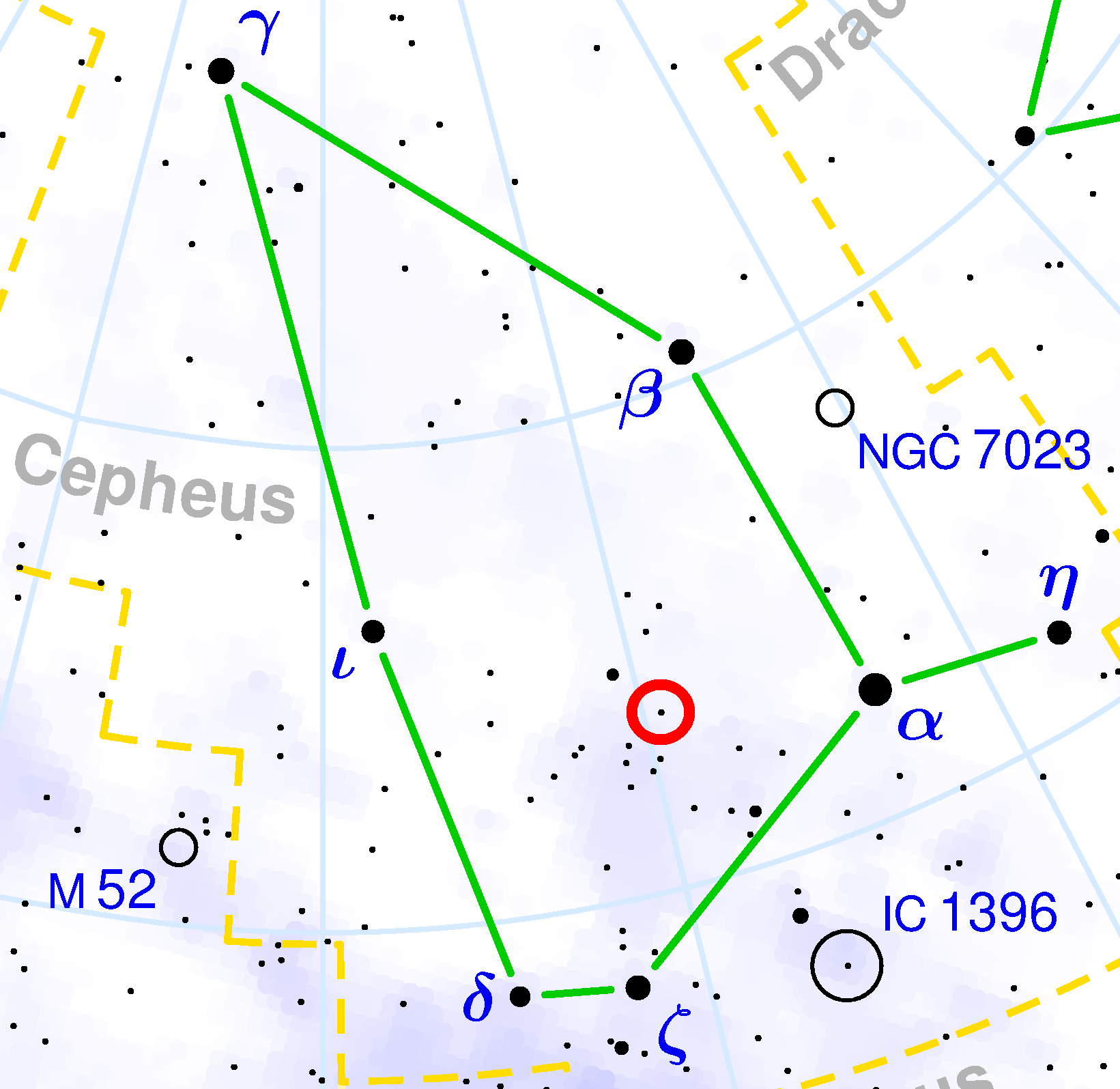
- Location of VV Cephei in Cepheus constellation

Observation data Epoch J2000 Equinox ICRS
- Constellation: Cepheus
- Right ascension: 21^{h} 56^{m} 39.14385^{s}
- Declination: +63° 37′ 32.0174″
- Apparent magnitude (V): 4.91 (4.80 - 5.36)

Characteristics
- U−B color index: +0.43
- B−V color index: +1.73
- Variable type: EA + SRc

A
- Evolutionary stage: Red supergiant
- Spectral type: M2 Iab (M1p 0)
- U−B color index: +2.07
- B−V color index: +1.82

B
- Evolutionary stage: main sequence
- Spectral type: B0-2 V
- U−B color index: −0.52
- B−V color index: +0.36

Astrometry
Proper motion (μ)	RA: −1.066 mas/yr Dec.: −0.425 mas/yr
Parallax (π)	1.0033±0.1073 mas
Distance	3,319 – 4900 ly (1,018+142 −99 – 1500±400 pc)
Absolute magnitude (M_{V})	−6.93

Orbit
Period (P)	7,430.5 days
Semi-major axis (a)	16.2 ± 3.7" (24.8 AU)
Eccentricity (e)	0.346 ± 0.01
Inclination (i)	84°
Semi-amplitude (K_{1}) (primary)	19.43 ± 0.33 km/s
Semi-amplitude (K_{2}) (secondary)	19.14 ± 0.68 km/s

Details

A
Mass	2.5 or 18.2 M_{☉}
Radius	660, 1,050 R_{☉}
Luminosity	72,880±16,300 L_{☉}
Surface gravity (log g)	–0.26 cgs
Temperature	3,660 – 3,826 K
Metallicity [Fe/H]	−0.06 dex
Age	25±0.1 Myr

B
Mass	8 or 18.6 M_{☉}
Radius	13 or 25 R_{☉}
Metallicity [Fe/H]	−0.14 dex
Age	25±0.1 Myr

Other designations
- VV Cep, HR 8383, HIP 108317, HD 208816, BD+62°2007, WDS J21567+6338, 2MASS J21563917+6337319, IRAS 21552+6323, AAVSO 2153+63, Gaia DR3 2216536246703152256, Gaia DR2 2216536246703152256

Database references
SIMBAD	data

VV Cephei, also known as HD 208816, is an eclipsing binary star system located in the constellation Cepheus. It is both a B[e] star and shell star. As a 5th magnitude star, it is visible to the naked eye under good observing conditions.

VV Cephei is an eclipsing binary with the third longest known period. A red supergiant fills its Roche lobe when closest to a companion blue star, the latter appearing to be on the main sequence. Matter flows from the red supergiant onto the blue companion for at least part of the orbit and the hot star is obscured by a large disk of material. The supergiant primary, known as VV Cephei A, is currently recognised as one of the largest stars in the galaxy although its size is not certain. Estimates range from 660 R_{☉} to over 1,000 R_{☉}.

== Variability ==
The fact that VV Cephei is an eclipsing binary system was discovered by American astronomer Dean McLaughlin in 1936. VV Cephei experiences both primary and secondary eclipses during a 20.3 year orbit. The primary eclipses totally obscure the hot secondary star and last for nearly 18 months. Secondary eclipses are so shallow that they have not been detected photometrically since the secondary obscures such a small proportion of the large cool primary star. The timing and duration of the eclipses is variable, although the exact onset is difficult to measure because it is gradual. Only ε Aurigae (period = 27.08 years), and AS Leonis Minoris (period = 69.1 years) have longer periods.

VV Cephei also shows semiregular variations of a few tenths of a magnitude. Visual and infrared variations appear unrelated to variations at ultraviolet wavelengths. A period of 58 days has been reported in UV, while the dominant period for longer wavelengths is 118.5 days. The short wavelength variations are thought to be caused by the disc around the hot secondary, while pulsation of the red supergiant primary caused the other variations. It has been predicted that the disc surrounding the secondary would produce such brightness variability.

== Spectrum ==
The spectrum of VV Cep can be resolved into two main components, originating from a cool supergiant and a hot small star surrounded by a disk. The material surrounding the hot secondary produces emission lines, including [Fe_{II}] forbidden lines, the B[e] phenomenon known from other stars surrounded by circumstellar disks. The hydrogen emission lines are double-peaked, caused by a narrow central absorption component. This is caused by seeing the disk almost edge on where it intercepts continuum radiation from the star. This is characteristic of shell stars.

Forbidden lines, mainly of Fe_{II} but also of Cu_{II} and Ni_{II}, are mostly constant in radial velocity and during eclipses, so they are thought to originate in distant circumbinary material.

The spectrum varies dramatically during the primary eclipses, particularly at the ultraviolet wavelengths produced most strongly by the hot companion and its disc. The typical B spectrum with some emission is replaced by a spectrum dominated by thousands of emission lines as portions of the disc are seen with the continuum from the star blocked. During ingress and egress, the emission line profiles change as one side or the other of the disc close to the star becomes visible while the other is still eclipsed. The colour of the system as a whole is also changed during eclipse, with much of the blue light from the companion blocked.

Out of eclipses, certain spectral lines vary strongly and erratically in both strength and shape, as well as the continuum. Rapid random variations in the short wavelength (i.e. hot) continuum appear to arise from the disc around the B component. Shell absorption lines show variable radial velocities, possibly due to variations in accretion from the disk. Emission from Fe_{II} and Mg_{II} strengthens around periastron or secondary eclipses, which occur at about the same time, but the emission lines also vary randomly throughout the orbit.

In the optical spectrum, the H_{α} is the only clear emission feature. Its strength varies randomly and rapidly out of eclipse, but it becomes much weaker and relatively constant during the primary eclipses.

== Distance ==
The distance to VV Cephei is uncertain. The star is often considered a member of the Cepheus OB2 association, which contains another large supergiant star, Mu Cephei. The Hipparcos and Gaia Data Release 2 parallax measurements imply distances of 0.752 and 0.6 kiloparsecs respectively, while an analysis by Bailer-Jones et al. using the Gaia Data Release 3 parallax provide a photogeometric distance of 1.02 kpc. Although consistent with the distance estimates of Cepheus OB2 and the star’s possible membership, these parallaxes are subject to inaccuracies, as changes in VV Cephei A's brightness can cause a measurable astrometric shift and therefore affect the parallax measurement. Assuming the Gaia DR3 distance, its K_{S} band absolute magnitude would be gauged at −10.2.

A 2004 study gives a higher distance of 1.5±0.4 kpc based on comparisons of linear and angular orbits, although the authors had noted it to be likely hardly reliable. An older analysis from 1977 applied the Barnes-Evans relation to give a distance of 1.28 kpc.

== Properties ==
=== Mass ===
It should be possible to calculate the masses of eclipsing binary stars with some accuracy, but in this case mass loss, changes in the orbital parameters, a disk obscuring the hot secondary, and doubt about the distance of the system have led to wildly varying estimates. The traditional model, from the spectroscopically derived orbit, has the masses of both stars around 20 M_{☉}, which is typical for a luminous red supergiant and an early B main sequence star. However, another model has been proposed based on the unexpected timing of the 1997 eclipse. Assuming that the change is due to mass transfer altering the orbit, dramatically lower mass values are required. In this model, the primary is a 2.5 M_{☉} AGB star and the secondary is an 8 M_{☉} B star. The spectroscopic radial velocities showing the secondary with equal mass to the primary is explained as being of a portion of the disc rather than the star itself.

=== Radius ===
Radius estimates of VV Cephei vary widely. Early estimates of the radius of the primary range from 1,200 to 1,600 solar radii, with an upper limit of 1,900 R_{☉}. Based on the two high end estimates, VV Cephei A was once considered one of the two largest known stars, along with Mu Cephei at 1,450–1,650 R_{☉}. The Roche lobe is calculated to be about 1,800 R_{☉}, thus the radius cannot be larger than this.

Infrared and near-infrared photometry, together with the spectral energy distribution of an M2 supergiant give an angular diameter of 6.38 milliarcseconds. This give a physical radius of either 694 R_{☉} (Note: Calculated using R = 107.5 • 𝜃 • D, where 𝜃 is the angular diameter in arcseconds, and D the distance in parsecs.) or 1,050 R_{☉}, adopting distances of 1,018 and 1,500 parsecs respectively. The angular diameter has later been measured in 2021 at 7.251 mas, giving a radius of 779 R_{☉} at the adopted Gaia DR3 distance of 1 kpc. However, this measurement might have been affected by the binarity of VV Cephei. A 2024 study give a radius of 660 R_{☉} adopting the Gaia DR3 distance.

The size of the secondary is even more uncertain, since it is physically and photometrically obscured by a much larger disc several hundred R_{☉} across. The secondary is certainly much smaller than either the primary or the disc, and has been calculated at 13 R_{☉} to 25 R_{☉} from the orbital solution.

=== Effective temperature ===
The temperature of the VV Cephei stars is again uncertain, partly because there simply isn't a single temperature that can be assigned to a significantly non-spherical diffuse star orbiting a hot companion. The effective temperature generally quoted for stars is the temperature of a spherical blackbody that approximates the electromagnetic radiation output of the actual star, accounting for emission and absorption in the spectrum. VV Cephei A is fairly clearly identified as an M2 supergiant, and as such, it is given a temperature around 3,800 K. The secondary star is heavily obscured by a disk of material from the primary, and its spectrum is almost undetectable against the disc emission. Detection of some ultraviolet absorption lines narrow down the spectral type to early B and it is apparently a main-sequence star, but likely to be abnormal in several respects due to mass transfer from the supergiant.

VV Cephei A has some emission lines, but these are produced from the accretion disc around the hot secondary.

== See also ==
- NML Cygni – One of the largest known stars
- Epsilon Aurigae – An eclipsing binary star containing a companion formerly considered the largest known star, along with VV Cephei A
- HR 5171 – A multiple star system containing an extremely large yellow hypergiant star
- R136a1 – One of the most massive and luminous stars known
- Stephenson 2 DFK 1 – One of the largest known stars
- VY Canis Majoris – One of the largest known stars
- WOH G64 – One of the largest known stars
