= 36 G. Doradus =

Astrometric binary star system in the constellation Dorado

- Location of 36 G. Doradus (circled in red)

Observation data Epoch J2000 Equinox ICRS
- Constellation: Dorado
- Right ascension: 05^{h} 54^{m} 06.05459^{s}
- Declination: −63° 05′ 23.2090″
- Apparent magnitude (V): 4.65

Characteristics
- Spectral type: K2 III
- B−V color index: 1.022±0.045

Astrometry
Radial velocity (R_{v})	+25.1±0.8 km/s
Proper motion (μ)	RA: +148.129 mas/yr Dec.: +550.143 mas/yr
Parallax (π)	36.5981±0.0924 mas
Distance	89.1 ± 0.2 ly (27.32 ± 0.07 pc)
Absolute magnitude (M_{V})	2.56

Details
Mass	1.28±0.03 M_{☉}
Radius	4.76±0.14 R_{☉}
Luminosity	9.68±0.40 L_{☉}
Surface gravity (log g)	3.020±0.155 cgs
Temperature	4,807±62 K
Metallicity [Fe/H]	+0.141±0.035 dex
Age	7.91 Gyr

Other designations
- CD−63°218, FK5 2452, GJ 224.1, GJ 9194, HD 40409, HIP 27890, HR 2102, SAO 249390

Database references
SIMBAD	data

36 G. Doradus (HD 40409) is a suspected astrometric binary star system in the southern constellation of Dorado. It is a faint system but visible to the naked eye with an apparent visual magnitude of 4.65. Based upon an annual parallax shift of 36.60 mas, it is located 89 light years away from the Sun. It is moving further away with a heliocentric radial velocity of +25 km/s. The system has a relatively high proper motion, traversing the celestial sphere at the rate of 0.57 arcseconds per year along a position angle of 14.51°.

Based on the stellar classification of K2 III assigned by Gray et al. (2006), the visible component is a K-type giant star. In contrast, Keenan and McNeil (1989) gave it a somewhat less evolved classification of K2 III–IV. It is about eight billion years old with 28% more mass than the Sun, and has expanded to 4.76 times the Sun's radius. The star is radiating 10 times the Sun's luminosity from its enlarged photosphere at an effective temperature of 4,807 K.
