= V602 Carinae =

Star in the constellation Carina

- Location of V602 Car

Observation data Epoch J2000.0 Equinox J2000.0 (ICRS)
- Constellation: Carina
- Right ascension: 11^{h} 13^{m} 29.9740^{s}
- Declination: −60° 05′ 28.838″
- Apparent magnitude (V): 7.6 - 9.1

Characteristics
- Evolutionary stage: Red supergiant or hypergiant
- Spectral type: M3 Ia-Iab
- U−B color index: +2.59
- B−V color index: +2.52
- Variable type: SRc

Astrometry
Proper motion (μ)	RA: −5.425 mas/yr Dec.: +2.183 mas/yr
Parallax (π)	0.4366±0.0698 mas
Distance	approx. 7,000 ly (approx. 2,300 pc)
Absolute magnitude (M_{V})	−4.83 (variable)

Details
Mass	17.7 – 20 M_{☉}
Radius	1,015 R_{☉}
Luminosity	126,000 L_{☉}
Surface gravity (log g)	−0.5 cgs
Temperature	3,400 K

Other designations
- V602 Car, CD−59°3623, HD 97671, IRAS 11113−5949, 2MASS J11132996−6005288

Database references
SIMBAD	data

V602 Carinae (abbreviated to V602 Car), also known as HD 97671, is a red supergiant or hypergiant variable star of spectral type M3 in the constellation Carina. It is considered to be one of largest known stars, being around 1,000 times larger than the Sun.

== Variability ==
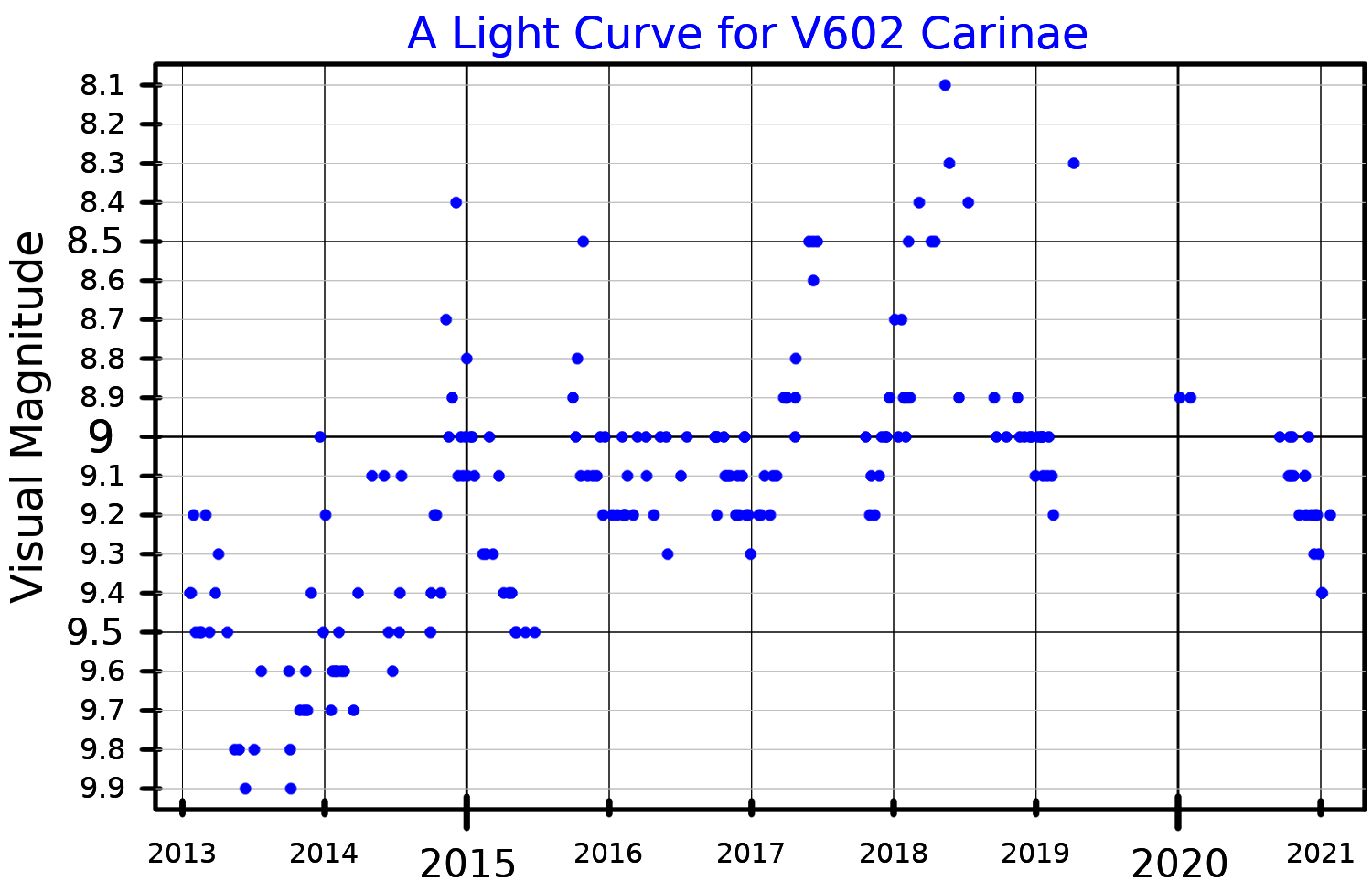
A visual band light curve for V602 Carinae, plotted from AAVSO data

V602 Car is a semiregular variable star with a maximum brightness range of magnitude 7.6 - 9.1 and a period of 635 or 672 days. Despite the large amplitude of variation, it was only named as a variable star in 2006.

== Properties ==
V602 Carinae is a red supergiant with a spectral type given in the General Catalogue of Variable Stars as M3Ia^{+}, suggesting the star is a hypergiant or an extremely luminous supergiant. It has been defined as a standard star for the MK spectral classification of M3Ia-Iab, which suggests the star is an intermediate-luminosity supergiant.

In 2005, V602 Car was calculated to have a bolometric luminosity below 110,000 L_{☉} and a radius around 860 R_{☉} based on the assumption of an effective temperature of 3,550 K. A 2015 study derived a slightly higher bolometric luminosity of 138,000+66,000
−45,000 L_{☉} based on the measured flux and an assumed distance, and a larger radius of 1,050±165 R_{☉} based on the measured angular diameter and luminosity. An effective temperature of 3,432±280 K was then calculated from the luminosity and radius. A more recent measurement based on a Gaia Data Release 2 parallax of 0.4366±0.0698 mas gives a luminosity at 125,000–131,000 L_{☉} with a corresponding radius of 932 R_{☉} based on the same effective temperature derived in 2005. The radius was measured again in 2024 at 1,015 R_{☉}.

V602 Car has an estimated mass loss rate of 1×10^{−5} M_{☉} per year. An excess of emission at long wavelengths from this star, as well as a small amount of silicate emission, suggests that it may be enclosed by an extensive cloud of dust.

== See also ==
- RT Carinae
- EV Carinae
