= 6 Cassiopeiae =

Star in the constellation Cassiopeia

- Location of 6 Cassiopeiae (circled in red)

Observation data Epoch J2000.0 Equinox ICRS
- Constellation: Cassiopeia
- Right ascension: 23^{h} 48^{m} 50.171^{s}
- Declination: +62° 12′ 52.26″
- Apparent magnitude (V): 5.34 - 5.45

Characteristics
- Spectral type: A2.5 Ia^{+}
- U−B color index: −0.02
- B−V color index: +0.67
- Variable type: α Cyg

Astrometry
Proper motion (μ)	RA: −3.300 mas/yr Dec.: −1.590 mas/yr
Parallax (π)	0.4264±0.0660 mas
Distance	approx. 8,000 ly (approx. 2,300 pc)
Absolute magnitude (M_{V})	−8.30

Details
Mass	22.0 M_{☉}
Radius	193 R_{☉}
Luminosity	200,000 L_{☉}
Surface gravity (log g)	1.59 cgs
Temperature	10,023±227 K
Metallicity [Fe/H]	0.29 dex
Rotational velocity (v sin i)	50 km/s

Other designations
- 6 Cas, V566 Cas, BD+61°2533, HD 223385, HIP 117447, HR 9018, SAO 20869

Database references
SIMBAD	data

6 Cassiopeiae (6 Cas) is a white hypergiant in the constellation Cassiopeia, and a small-amplitude variable star. At 5th magnitude, it is visible to the naked eye under good observing conditions.

== System ==
6 Cassiopeiae is a white A2.5 type hypergiant. It is about 25 times as massive as the Sun and 200,000 times as luminous. The star is slightly and erratically variable, an Alpha Cygni variable. Not all sources consider 6 Cas to be a hypergiant. It is thought that the "+" in an early A3 Ia+ spectral classification referred to indications of additional spectral features from a possible companion rather than the more modern indication of a hypergiant luminosity class. However, later publications have given more conventional hypergiant spectral types such as B9Ia^{+} and A3Ia^{+}.

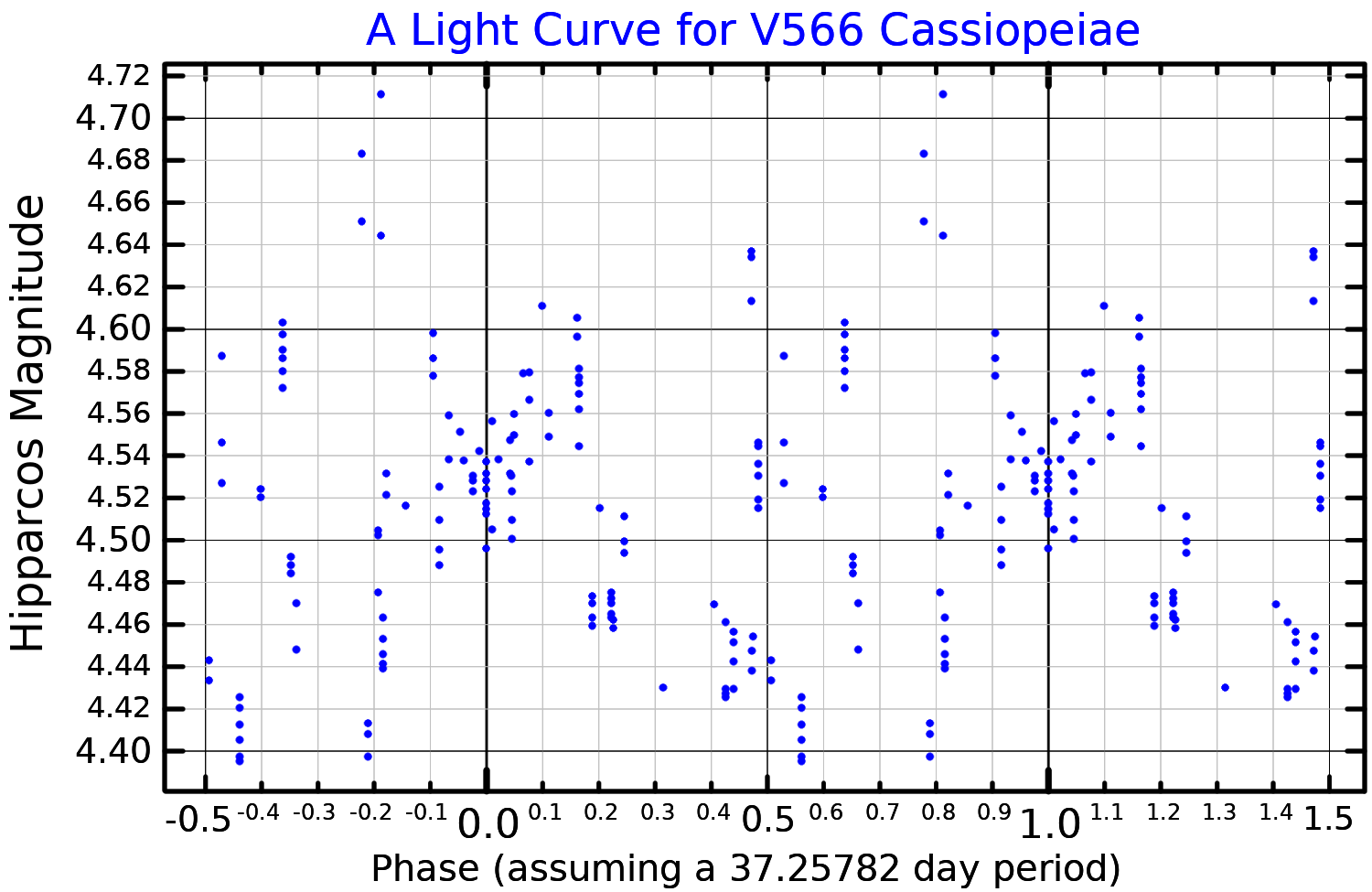
A light curve for V566 Cassiopeiae from Hipparcos data, plotted as a function of phase assuming the dominant period found by Koen and Eyer (2002)

6 Cas has a number of close companions, most notably an 8th magnitude O class bright giant at only 1.5″. Its spectral type is O9.75 and its absolute magnitude is −5.8. Both are considered to be members of the Cassiopeia OB5 stellar association at a distance of around 8,000 light-years, along with several other nearby stars. Gaia parallaxes of the nearby stars suggest a mean distance to the association of about 9,000 light years.

== Variability ==
Manali Kallat Vainu Bappu discovered that the star's brightness varies, in 1958. 6 Cas A is an α Cyg variable, pulsating erratically between 5.34 and 5.45. The strongest period detected in one study was 37 days. It has the variable star designation V566 Cassiopeiae.
