= HD 32034 =

Hypergiant star in the constellation Dorado

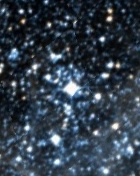
- Picture of HD 32034 (circled)

Observation data Epoch J2000 Equinox ICRS
- Constellation: Dorado
- Right ascension: 04^{h} 55^{m} 11.08594^{s}
- Declination: −67° 10′ 10.4091″
- Apparent magnitude (V): 9.715

Characteristics
- Spectral type: B9Iae
- U−B color index: −0.67
- B−V color index: +0.10

Astrometry
Radial velocity (R_{v})	31213±0.08 km/s
Proper motion (μ)	RA: +1.633 mas/yr Dec.: −0.022 mas/yr
Parallax (π)	0.0042±0.0131 mas
Absolute magnitude (M_{V})	−9.77

Details
Mass	58 M_{☉}
Radius	285 R_{☉}
Luminosity	310,000 L_{☉}
Surface gravity (log g)	1.29 cgs
Temperature	9,797 K
Age	1 Myr

Other designations
- RMC 62, R 62, HD 32034, GSC 08889-00589, ALS 15895, GV 80, CPD−67°364, LHA 120-S 7, 2MASS J04551106-6710104

Database references
SIMBAD	data

HD 32034 (or R 62) is one of seven blue hypergiants in the Large Magellanic Cloud and is suspected to be a shell star. It lies within the loose association of stars designated NGC 1747, although it is uncertain whether it is a member.
