= CK Carinae =

Red supergiant star in the constellation Carina

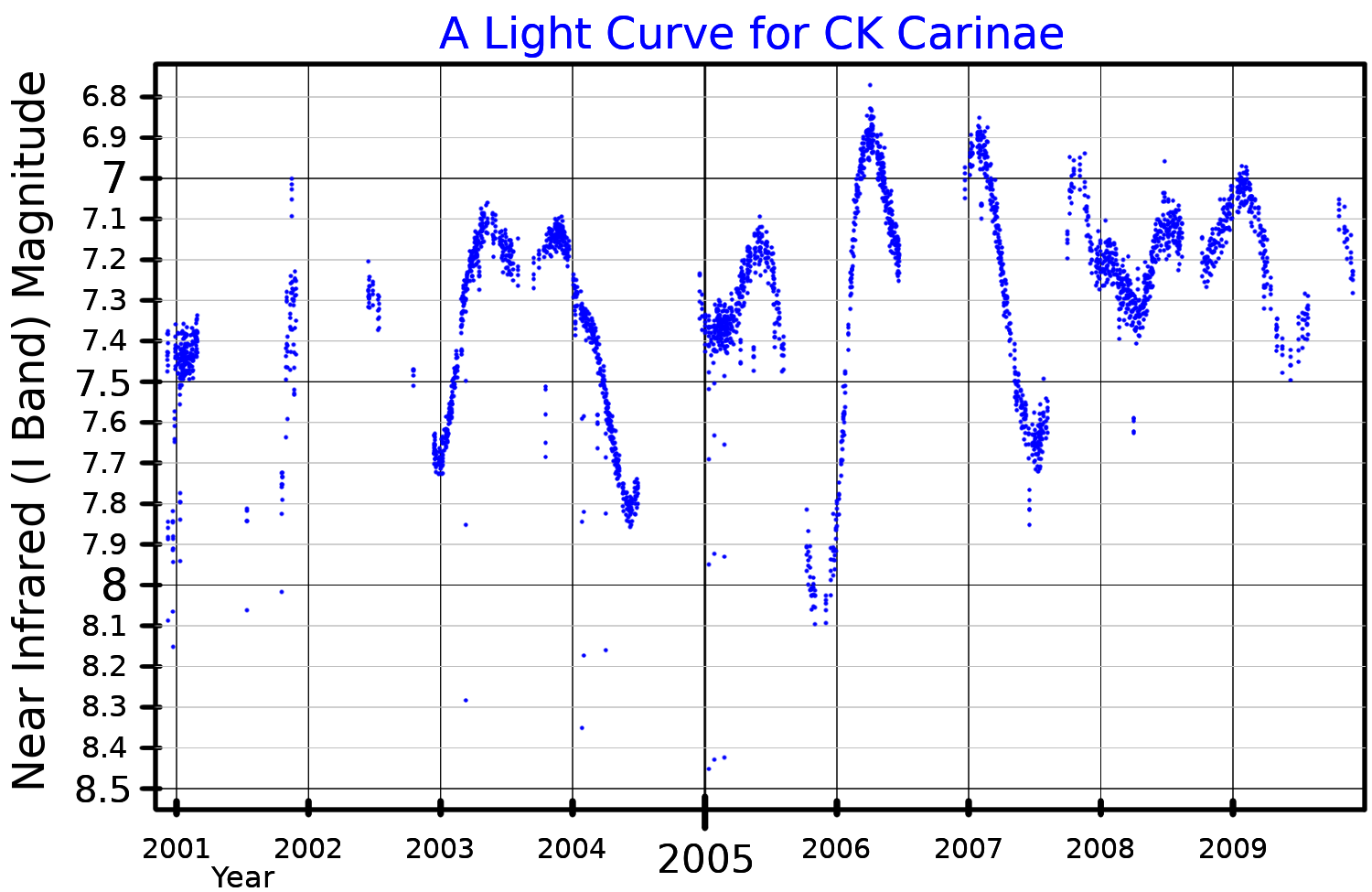
- An I band (near infrared) light curve for CK Carinae, plotted from ASAS data

Observation data Epoch J2000 Equinox ICRS
- Constellation: Carina
- Right ascension: 10^{h} 24^{m} 25.36^{s}
- Declination: −60° 11′ 29.0″
- Apparent magnitude (V): 7.2 - 8.5

Characteristics
- Evolutionary stage: red supergiant
- Spectral type: M3.5 Iab
- B−V color index: +2.21
- Variable type: SRc

Astrometry
Radial velocity (R_{v})	−3.92 km/s
Proper motion (μ)	RA: −7.351 mas/yr Dec.: 2.995 mas/yr
Parallax (π)	0.4286±0.0806 mas
Distance	2,920+190 −150 pc
Absolute magnitude (M_{V})	−6.31

Details
Mass	15 M_{☉}
Radius	690 R_{☉}
Luminosity	72,000 L_{☉}
Surface gravity (log g)	0 cgs
Temperature	3,500 K
Metallicity [Fe/H]	0.05 dex

Other designations
- CK Car, CD−59°3058, HD 90382, SAO 238038

Database references
SIMBAD	data

CK Carinae (CK Car / HD 90382 / SAO 238038) is a variable star in the constellation Carina, the keel of Argo Navis. It is a member of the star association Carina OB1-D, at a distance of around 2,300 parsecs or 7,500 light years.

In 1921, Ida E. Woods discovered that the star's brightness varied. It was given its variable star designation, CK Carinae, in 1922. Classified as a semiregular variable star, CK Carinae's brightness varies between apparent magnitudes +7.2 and +8.5 with a period of approximately 525 days. It has a Gaia Data Release 2 parallax of 0.4286±0.0806 mas, which implies a distance of around 2,300 pc, and is thought to be a member of the Carina OB1-D stellar association which is at a distance of about 2,200 pc. An analysis of the distances of apparently-nearby OB stars implies a distance of 2,920 pc for CK Carinae. It has an MK spectral classification of M3.5 Iab, with the luminosity class indicating an intermediate luminosity supergiant.

CK Carinae is a red supergiant with an effective temperature of 3,500 K. It is 690 times larger than the Sun, which means that if it were in the place of the Sun, its surface would reach beyond the orbit of Mars, with Earth being encompassed within the star. Consequently, CK Carinae is also a luminous star, radiating 72,000 times as much energy as the sun.
