= HD 160529 =

Luminous blue variable star in the constellation Scorpius

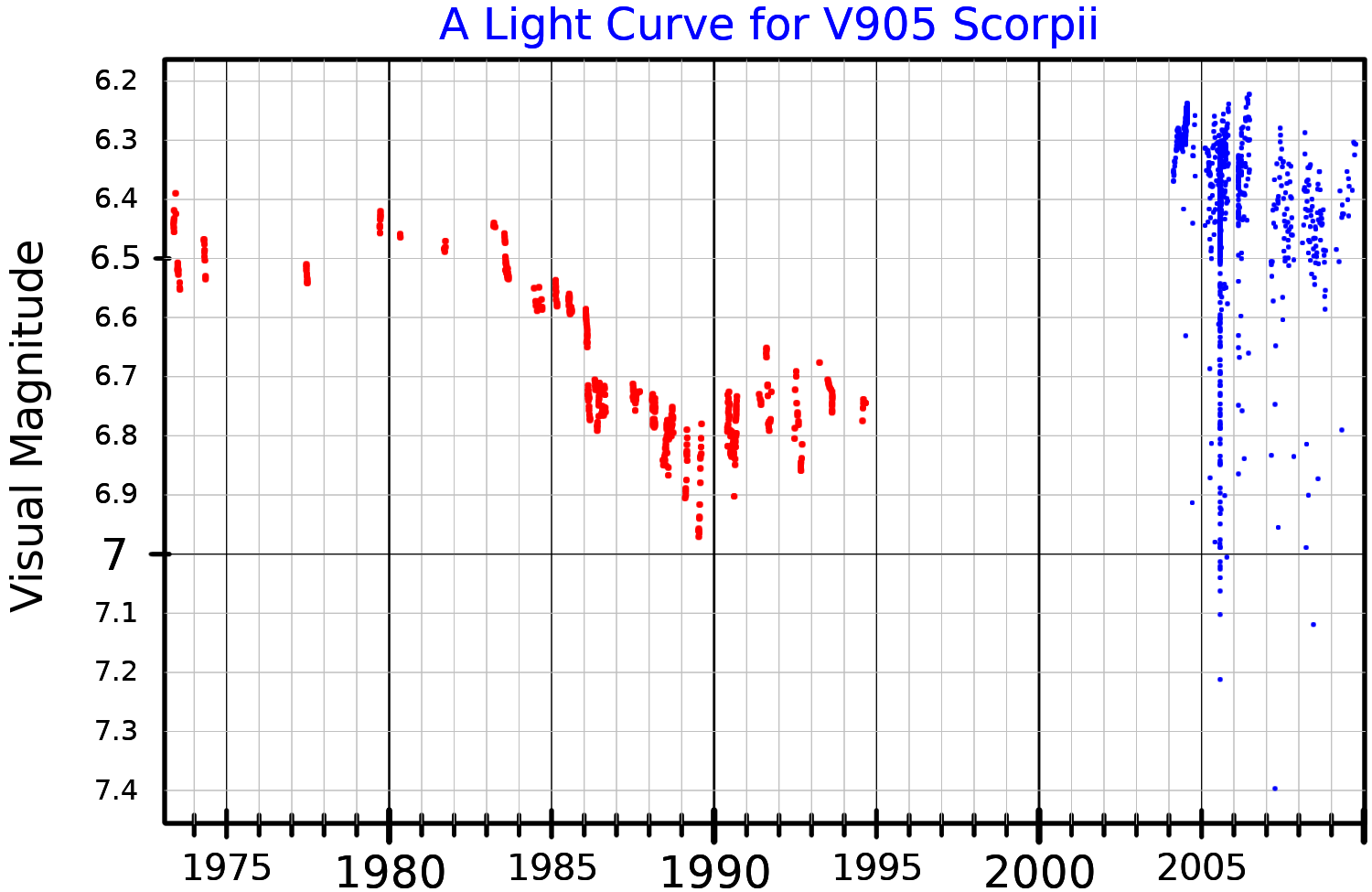
- A visual band light curve for V905 Scorpii. The red points are from Sterken et al. (1997), and the blue points are ASAS data.

Observation data Epoch J2000 Equinox ICRS
- Constellation: Scorpius
- Right ascension: 17^{h} 41^{m} 59.025^{s}
- Declination: −33° 30′ 13.71″
- Apparent magnitude (V): 6.66 (6.3–6.9)

Characteristics
- Spectral type: LBV
- U−B color index: +0.30
- B−V color index: +1.21
- Variable type: LBV

Astrometry
Radial velocity (R_{v})	−35 km/s
Proper motion (μ)	RA: −1.75 mas/yr Dec.: −1.49 mas/yr
Parallax (π)	0.54±0.54 mas
Distance	2,500 pc
Absolute magnitude (M_{V})	−8.9

Details
Mass	13 M_{☉}
Radius	150–330 R_{☉}
Luminosity	290,000 L_{☉}
Surface gravity (log g)	0.55 cgs
Temperature	8,000–12,000 K
Rotational velocity (v sin i)	45 km/s

Other designations
- V905 Sco, HD 160529, CD −33°12361, SAO 209151, HIP 86624

Database references
SIMBAD	data

HD 160529 (V905 Scorpii) is a luminous blue variable (LBV) star located in the constellation of Scorpius. With an apparent magnitude of around +6.8 it cannot be seen with the naked eye except under very favourable conditions, but it is easy to see with binoculars or amateur telescopes.

== Physical characteristics ==
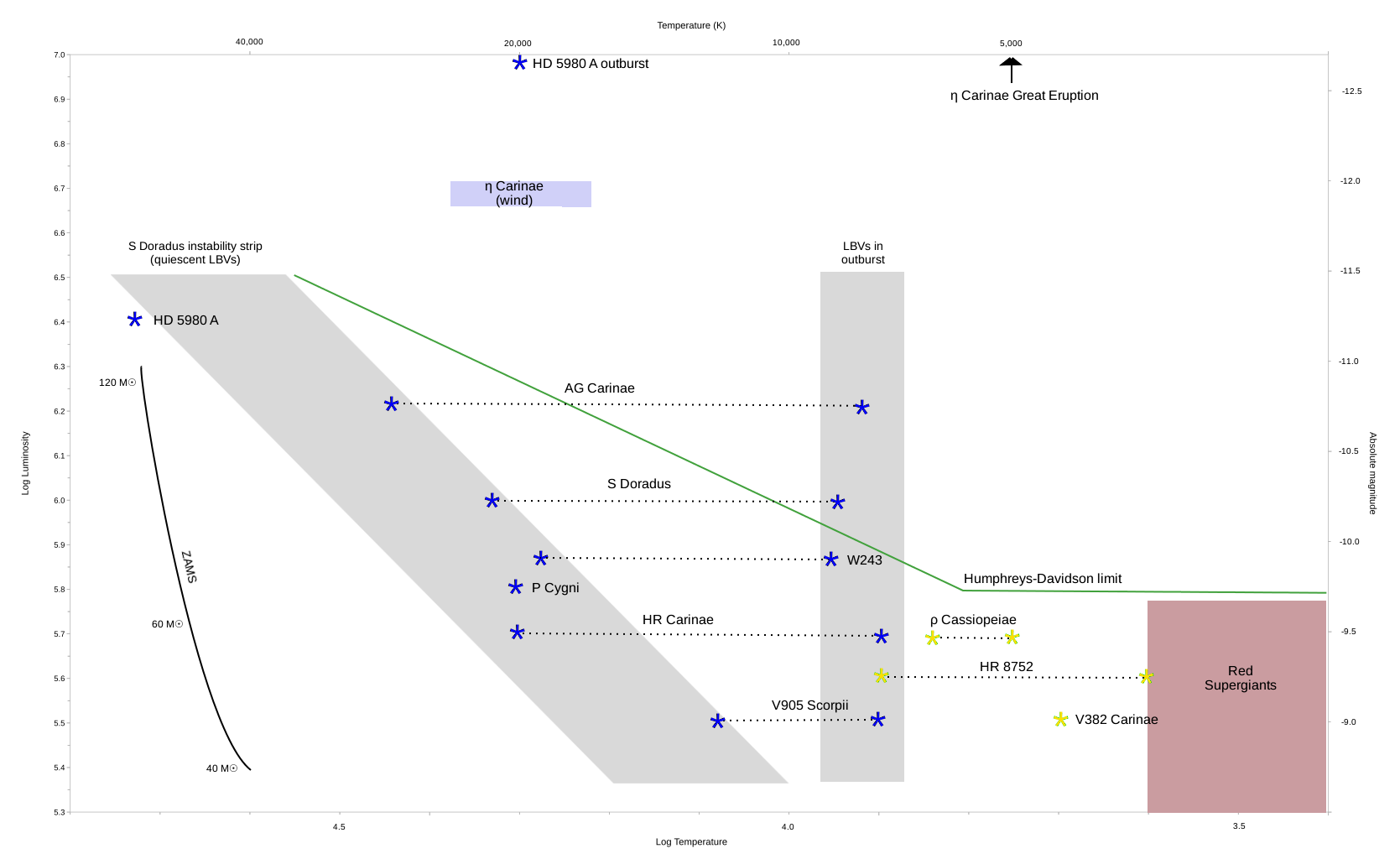
V905 Sco in comparison to other LBVs and cool hypergiants

In 1974, Bernhard Wolf et al. announced that the brightness of HD 160529 varied on the timescale of days or weeks. Two years later, Christiaan Sterken showed that it also varied on timescales of a few hours. The star has a peculiar variable spectral type with emission lines and P Cygni profiles. At visual maximum it is similar to an A9 star and at minimum close to B8. The distance has been estimated at 2.5 kiloparsecs (8,200 light years) based on the assumption of an absolute magnitude of −8.9. However this distance is uncertain and values between 1.9 kiloparsecs and 3.5 kiloparsecs have been proposed.

Working with a distance of 2.5 kiloparsecs, the radius varies from 150 R_{☉} when quiescent to 330 R_{☉} in outburst. The temperature also varies, from 8,000K in outburst to 12,000K when quiescent. With these parameters, the apparent visual magnitude varies by 0.5 and the bolometric luminosity is constant at 180,000 L_{☉}.

Estimates of the surface gravity lead to a mass of 13 M_{☉} and a probable initial mass of 25 M_{☉} This suggests that V905 Sco is a former red supergiant star.
