= WOH G64 =

Binary star in the constellation Dorado

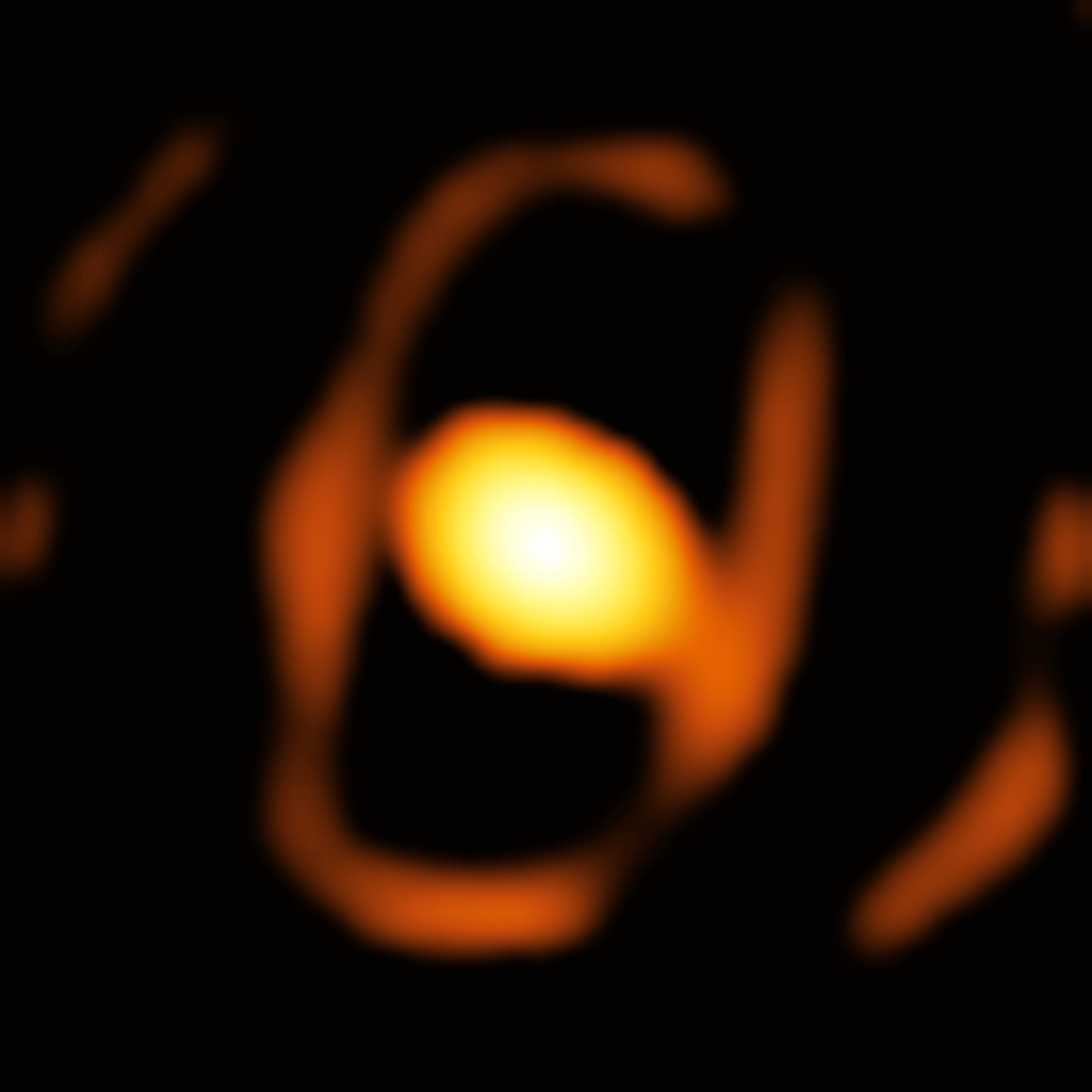
- VLTI image of the dusty torus around WOH G64. Credit: European Southern Observatory

Observation data Epoch J2000.0 Equinox ICRS
- Constellation: Dorado
- Right ascension: 04^{h} 55^{m} 10.5252^{s}
- Declination: −68° 20′ 29.998″
- Apparent magnitude (V): 17.7–18.8

Characteristics

A
- Evolutionary stage: OH/IR extreme red supergiant or red hypergiant
- Spectral type: M5I–M7.5e
- Apparent magnitude (K): 6.849
- Apparent magnitude (R): 15.69
- Apparent magnitude (G): 15.0971
- Apparent magnitude (I): 12.795
- Apparent magnitude (J): 9.252
- Apparent magnitude (H): 7.745
- Variable type: Slow irregular variable + symbiotic

B
- Spectral type: B

Astrometry
Radial velocity (R_{v})	285±2 km/s
Proper motion (μ)	RA: +1.689 mas/yr Dec.: −0.013 mas/yr
Distance	163,000 ly (50,000 pc)
Absolute magnitude (M_{V})	−6.00

Details

A
Mass	~20 M_{☉}
Radius	1,540±77 R_{☉}
Luminosity	282,000+34,400 −30,700 L_{☉}
Surface gravity (log g)	−0.5±0.1 cgs
Temperature	3,400±25 K
Age	≤5 Myr

Other designations
- LI-LMC 181, MSX LMC 1182, IRAS 04553–6825, 2MASS J04551048−6820298

Database references
SIMBAD	data
- Location of WOH G64 (circled) in the Large Magellanic Cloud; Credit: NASA/JPL-Caltech/M. Meixner (STScI) & the SAGE Legacy Team

WOH G64 (IRAS 04553–6825) is a symbiotic binary in the Large Magellanic Cloud, roughly 50 kiloparsecs (163,000 light-years) from Earth.

The primary component is an extreme red supergiant or red hypergiant that may be the largest known star with a well-defined radius, calculated to be around 1,540 times that of the Sun (R_{☉}). At this radius, an object travelling at the speed of light would take over 6 hours to go around its surface, compared to just 14.5 seconds for the Sun. It is also one of the most luminous and massive red supergiants, with a luminosity around 282,000 times the solar luminosity (L_{☉}) and a mass roughly 20 times that of the Sun (M_{☉}). If placed at the center of the Solar System, the star's photosphere would engulf the orbit of Jupiter. The secondary component, being recently confirmed, is comparatively nowhere near as well-studied but it is at least understood to be a B-type star.

WOH G64 is surrounded by an optically thick dust envelope of roughly a light year in diameter, containing 3 to 9 times the Sun's mass of expelled material that was created by the strong stellar wind of the red supergiant primary.

== Observational history ==
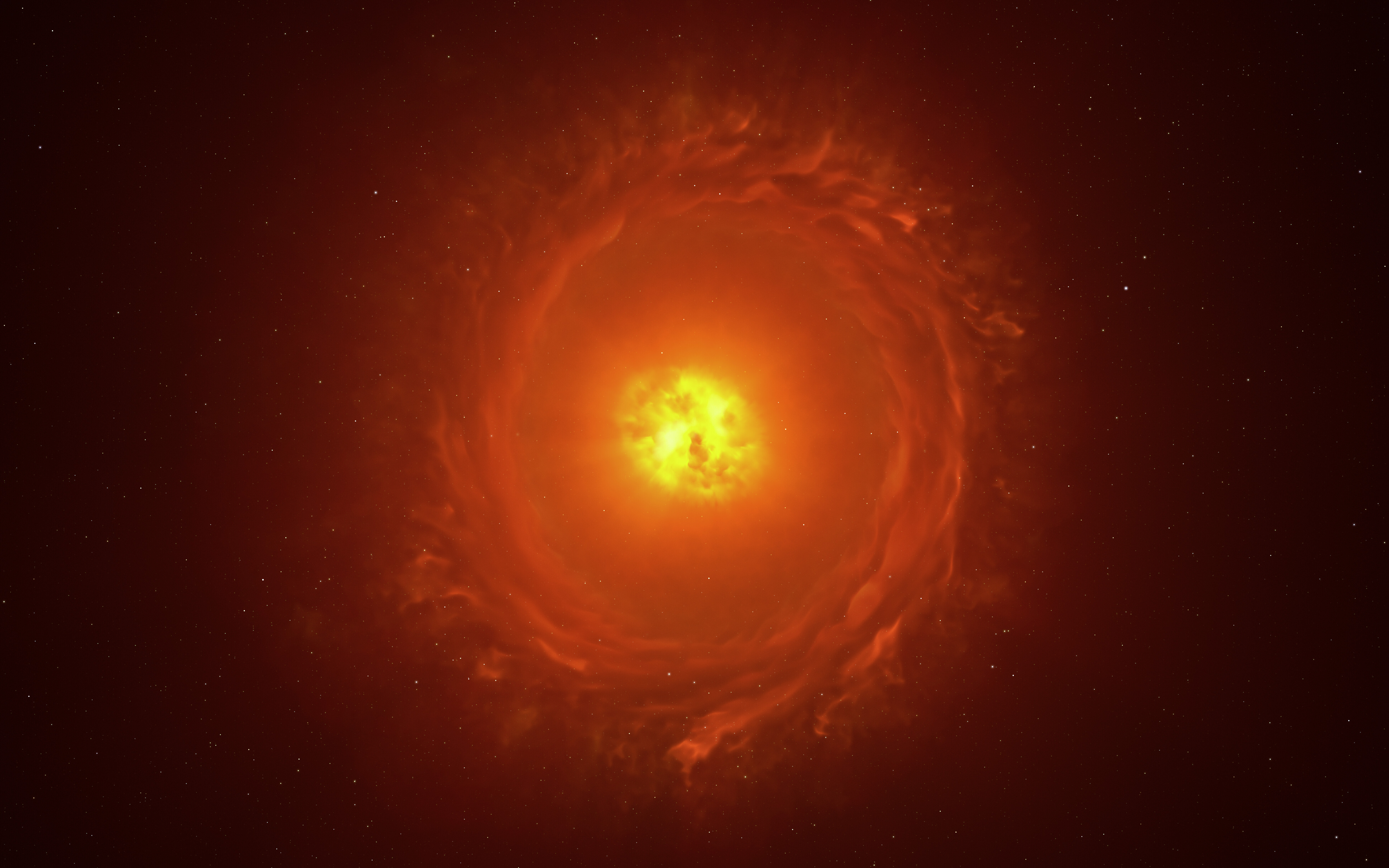
Artist's impression of the dusty torus and elliptical cocoon of dust surrounding WOH G64 (European Southern Observatory)

WOH G64 was discovered in the 1970s by Bengt Westerlund, Nils Olander, and B. Hedin. Like NML Cygni, the "WOH" in the star's name comes from the last names of its three discoverers, but in this case refers to a whole catalogue of giant and supergiant stars in the Large Magellanic Cloud. Westerlund also discovered four red supergiants in the massive super star cluster Westerlund 1 in the constellation Ara, notably including W26. In 1986, infrared observations showed that it was a highly luminous supergiant surrounded by gas and dust, which absorbed around three-quarters of its radiation.

In 2007, observers using the Very Large Telescope (VLT) showed that WOH G64 is surrounded by a torus-shaped cloud. In 2024, the dusty torus around WOH G64 was directly imaged by VLTI, showing the elongated and compact emission around the hypergiant. This is also the first interferometric imaging of a star outside the Milky Way.

== Distance ==
WOH G64 is assumed to be around 50 kiloparsecs (163,000 light-years) away from Earth, since it appears to be in the Large Magellanic Cloud. The Gaia Data Release 3 parallax for WOH G64 is −0.2477±0.0430 mas, which cannot not provide a reliable distance due to being negative.

== Variability ==
WOH G64 A used to vary regularly in brightness by over a magnitude at visual wavelengths with a primary period of around 800 days. The star suffers from over six magnitudes of extinction at visual wavelengths, and the variation at infra-red wavelengths is much smaller. It has been described as a carbon-rich Mira or long-period variable, which would necessarily be an asymptotic-giant-branch star (AGB star) rather than a supergiant. Brightness variability has been confirmed by other researchers in some spectral bands, but it is unclear what the actual variable type is. No significant spectral variation has been found. The variability has since been observed to transition from semi-regular to irregular circa 2014.

== Physical properties ==
WOH G64 A was discovered to be a prominent source of OH, H_{2}O, and SiO masers emission, which is typical of an OH/IR supergiant star. It also shows an unusual spectrum of nebular emission; the hot gas is rich in nitrogen and has a radial velocity considerably more positive than that of the star. The stellar atmosphere is producing a strong silicate absorption band in mid-infrared wavelengths, accompanied by line emission due to highly excited carbon monoxide.

The spectral type of WOH G64 A is given as M5, but it is usually found to have a much cooler M7.5, which is highly unusual for a supergiant star. The combination of the star's temperature and luminosity, based on most estimates, placed it toward the upper right corner of the Hertzsprung–Russell diagram. It has an average mass loss rate of 3.1 to 7.4×10^{−4} M_{☉} per year, among the highest known and unusually high even for a red supergiant.

Based on spectroscopic measurements assuming spherical shells, the red supergiant primary was originally calculated to have luminosity between 490,000 and 600,000 L_{☉}, suggesting an initial mass of at least 40 M_{☉} and consequently larger values for the radius between 2,575 and 3,000 R_{☉}. One measurement from 2018 gives a luminosity of 432,000 L_{☉} and a higher effective temperature of 3,500 K, based on optical and infrared photometry and assuming spherically-symmetric radiation from the surrounding dust. This would suggest a radius of 1,788 R_{☉}. (Note: Applying the Stefan-Boltzmann Law with a nominal solar effective temperature of 5,772 K: $$\sqrt{(5772/3500)^4 * 432,190} = 1787.94\ R\odot$$)

The dust surrounding WOH G64 A was revealed in 2007 to have a torus-like shape, which was being viewed pole-on, meaning that the previous radius and luminosity estimates, which assumed spherical dust shells, were overestimated, as the radiation escapes through the cavity (i.e., toward us). Many other disks have also been observed around other heavily mass-losing hypergiant stars, such as VY Canis Majoris, Mu Cephei, and the post-red supergiant IRC +10420. A much lower luminosity of 280,000 L_{☉} was derived based on radiative transfer modelling of the surrounding torus, suggesting an initial mass of 25±5 M_{☉} and a radius around 1,730 R_{☉} for an effective temperature of 3,200 K.

=== Largest known star ===
In 2009, Levesque et al. (2009) calculated an effective temperature of 3,400±25 K by spectral fitting of the optical and near-UV SED. Taking the flux contribution of the dusty torus into account gives a luminosity of 282,000+34,400
−30,700 L_{☉}, similar to the luminosity calculated by Ohnaka et al. (2008). Combining this luminosity with the newly-derived temperature gives a radius of 1,540±77 R_{☉}. Those physical parameters are consistent with the largest galactic red supergiants and hypergiants found elsewhere such as VY Canis Majoris and with theoretical models of the coolest, most luminous and largest possible cool supergiants (e.g. the Hayashi limit or the Humphreys–Davidson limit).

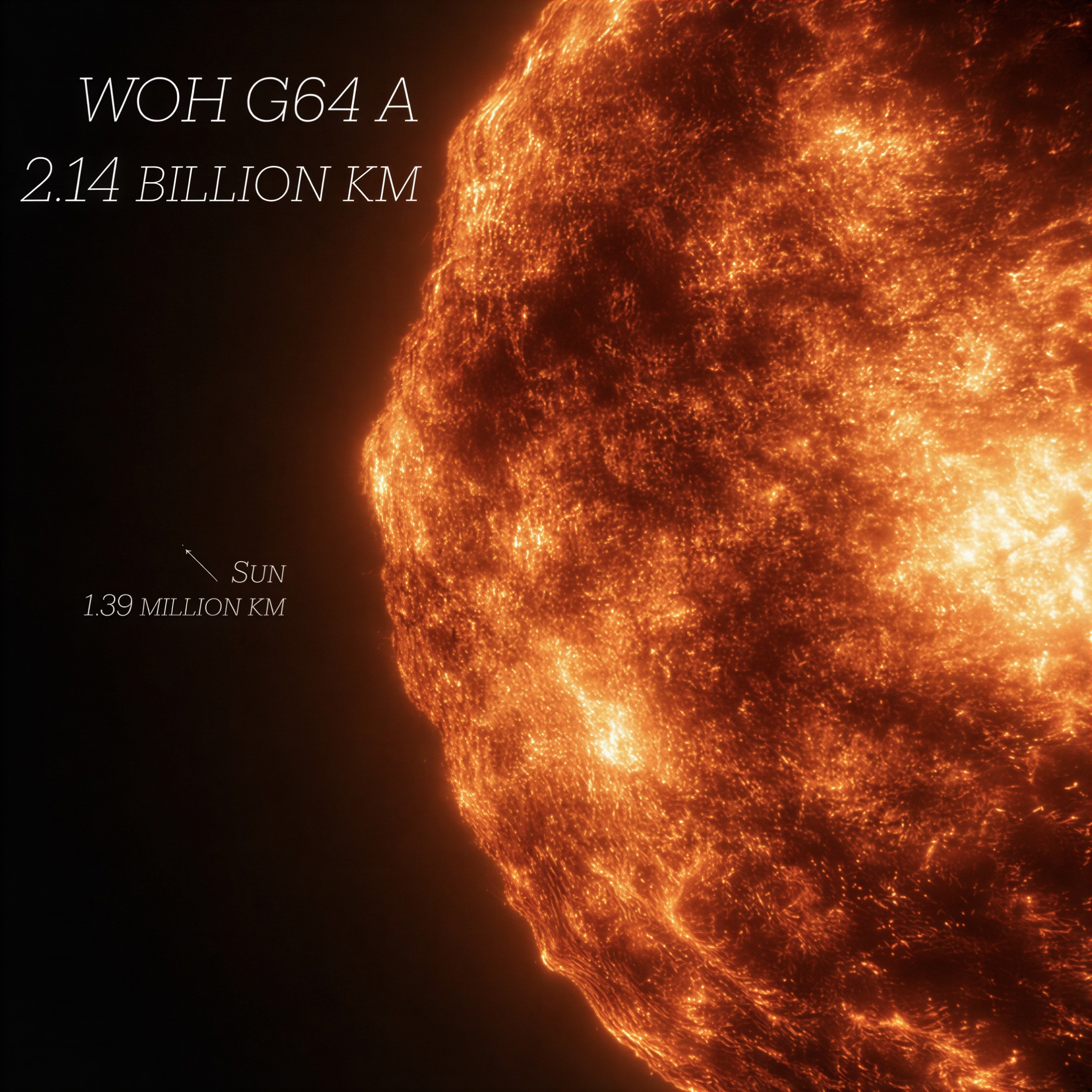
An illustration of WOH G64 A compared to the Sun

WOH G64 A is possibly the largest known star and the most luminous and coolest red supergiant in the Large Magellanic Cloud. The combination of the star's temperature and luminosity placed it toward the upper right corner of the Hertzsprung–Russell diagram. It has an average mass loss rate of 3.1 to 7.4×10^{−4} M_{☉} per year, among the highest known and unusually high even for a red supergiant.

=== Supposed yellow hypergiant transition ===
Photometric measurements spanning from 30 years showed a transition from semi-regular to irregular variability during around 2014, which together with the absence or strength of certain spectral lines in spectroscopic observations that would be inconsistent with a red supergiant, led Muñoz-Sanchez et al. (2024) to conclude that WOH G64 A transitioned from a red supergiant to a yellow hypergiant. The lack of a violent outburst and smooth transition would be explained by the presence of a B-type companion forming a symbiotic binary. As a yellow hypergiant, WOH G64 A would be half of its original size, at 800 R_{☉}, and have a hotter effective temperature of 4,700 K with a likely spectral class of either early K or late G.

This interpretation was subsequently challenged by Van Loon & Ohnaka (2026), which detected molecular absorption bands of titanium oxide in spectroscopic data taken between 2024 and 2025, implying that the central component is still a red supergiant. The anomalies observed by Muñoz-Sanchez et al. (2024) were explained instead by the periastron passage of the companion: Its tidal forces stretched the outer layers of the primary's atmosphere, causing the atmospheric layer of optical depth 1 to be an inner layer that has a hotter temperature, instead of a cooler layer as it used to be. This, in turn, changes the nature of the variability. Since then, the star has returned to its original state.

== Companion ==
WOH G64 A was historically considered to be a solitary red supergiant star, with no known companions. However, since 2016, its spectrum exhibits features of B[e] stars, which is interpreted as the spectral signature of a massive symbiotic binary consisting of a supergiant losing material to an accreting B-type star companion. The persistent presence of surrounding hot dust, elongated emission in interferometric imaging, and the decline in optical brightness in the 2010s further supports the binary nature of WOH G64. The orbital period of such a companion is no less than a century. The presence of a hot stellar companion of WOH G64 A was first suspected by Levesque et al. (2009), who proposed that a late O-type main-sequence star companion of a bolometric magnitude of −7.5 or a luminosity of 100,000 L_{☉} could be ionizing the nebula surrounding WOH G64 A in order to explain the 50 km/s shift between the nebular emission lines and WOH G64 A's spectral features.

== See also ==
- Antares, formerly considered the largest known star
- Epsilon Aurigae, another eclipsing binary star containing a yellow supergiant primary and a companion formerly considered the largest known star
- B90, another extreme red supergiant in the Large Magellanic Cloud
- IRC +10420, an OH/IR yellow hypergiant evolving bluewards, to which WOH G64 A was once considered to be
- R136a1, one of the most massive and luminous stars known
- VV Cephei, a notable eclipsing binary star containing a red supergiant primary and an accreting companion
