= LMC N79 =

Nebula in the Large Magellanic Cloud

Emission nebula
- star-forming region
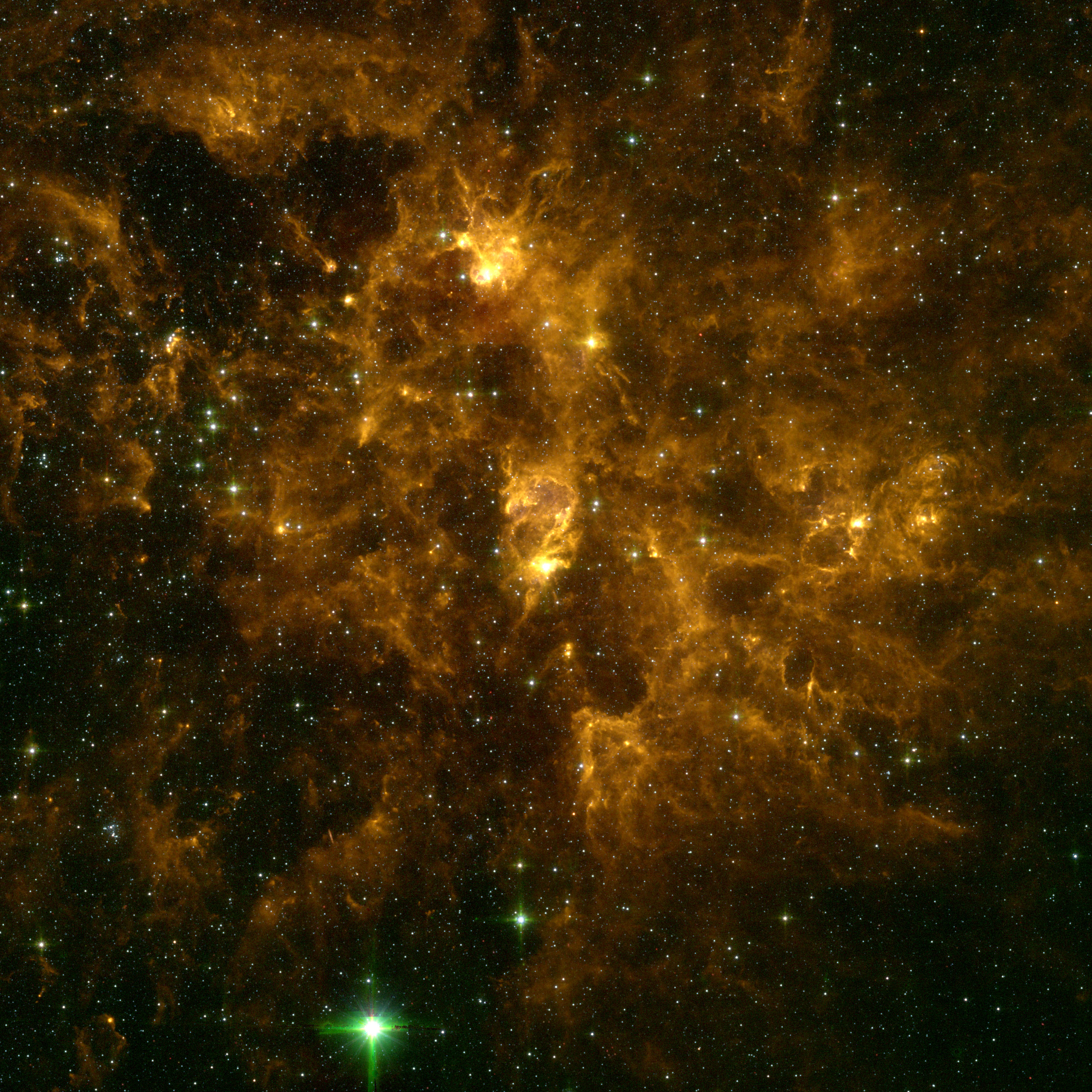
- LMC N79 with the Spitzer Space Telescope. The nebula in the center is N79-S, containing a super star cluster

Observation data: J2000 epoch
- Right ascension: 04^{h} 52^{m} 00.0^{s}
- Declination: −69° 22′ 30″
- Apparent dimensions (V): 1038" x 814"
- Constellation: Dorado
- Designations: LHA 120-N 79, DEM L 10, DEM L 6

LMC N79 (or LHα 120-N79) is an emission nebula in the Large Magellanic Cloud. The nebula is part of the catalog of H-alpha stars and nebulae by Karl G. Henize, published in 1956. It is composed of the smaller nebulae N79A to N79E. From a CO survey it was however seen that the nebula is larger and contains N79-S, N79-W and N79-E. These nebulae were described by Henize with other names, with N79-S being the original N79 nebula, N79-W being N77 and N79-E being N83.

NGC/IC objects overlapping with N79
| Henize | Ochsendorf+ | NGC nebula | NGC star cluster | IC objects |
|---|---|---|---|---|
| N79 | N79-S | NGC 1722 | NGC 1727, NGC 1712 | IC 2111 |
| N77 | N79-W | | NGC 1698 | IC 2105 |
| N83 | N79-E | NGC 1737 | NGC 1743, NGC 1745, NGC 1748 | IC 2114 |

== Super star cluster ==
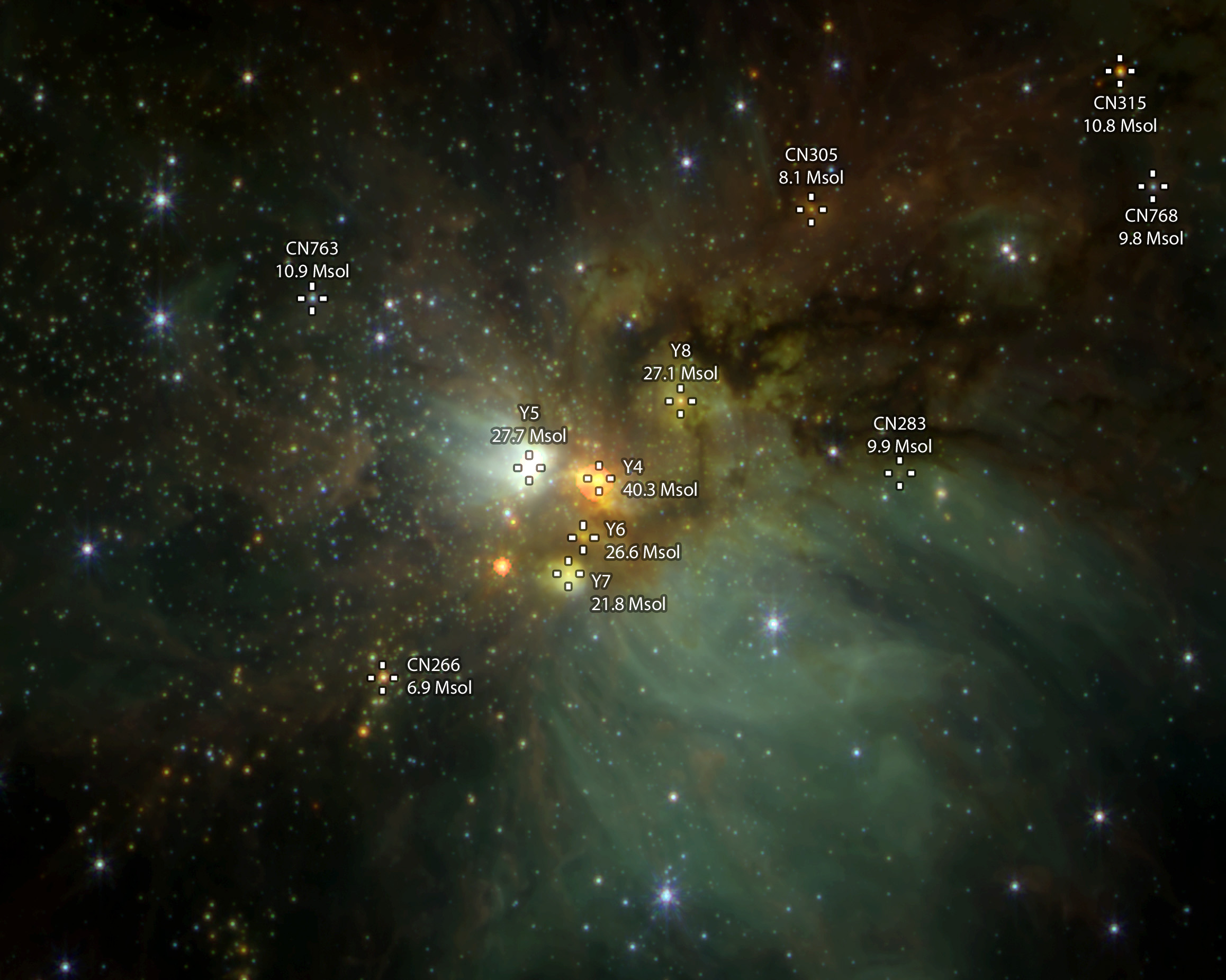
central massive stars of the super star cluster with NIRCam. The most massive stars are labeled Y4-Y8

The central nebula N79-S contains the super star cluster (SSC) H72.97-69.39, also called HSO BMHERICC J072.9711-69.3911. This SSC was first suspected to exist in N79 in 2017 from Spitzer and Herschel observations. The SSC was observed with ALMA. This showed that the SSC is at the center of two colliding filaments. ALMA also showed bipolar outflows that are 65,000 years old and a HII region associated with the SSC. The stellar content was first studied with Gemini in 2021. At that time it was estimated that the SSC contains stars with a mass between 10,000 and 100,000 M_{☉}. Observations with JWST confirmed H72.97-69.39 as a SSC. Researchers discovered five massive stars in the center of the SSC with masses ranging between 20 and 40 M_{☉}. The youngest massive young stellar objects (YSOs) of H72.97-69.39 is called Y3 and is 10,000 years old. The central ionizing source is Y4, which is the most massive of the YSOs with a mass of around 40 M_{☉}. With MIRI the researchers identified 102 embedded YSOs in total. Yet to be published work with NIRCam detected 1550 young stars in N79.

== Gallery ==
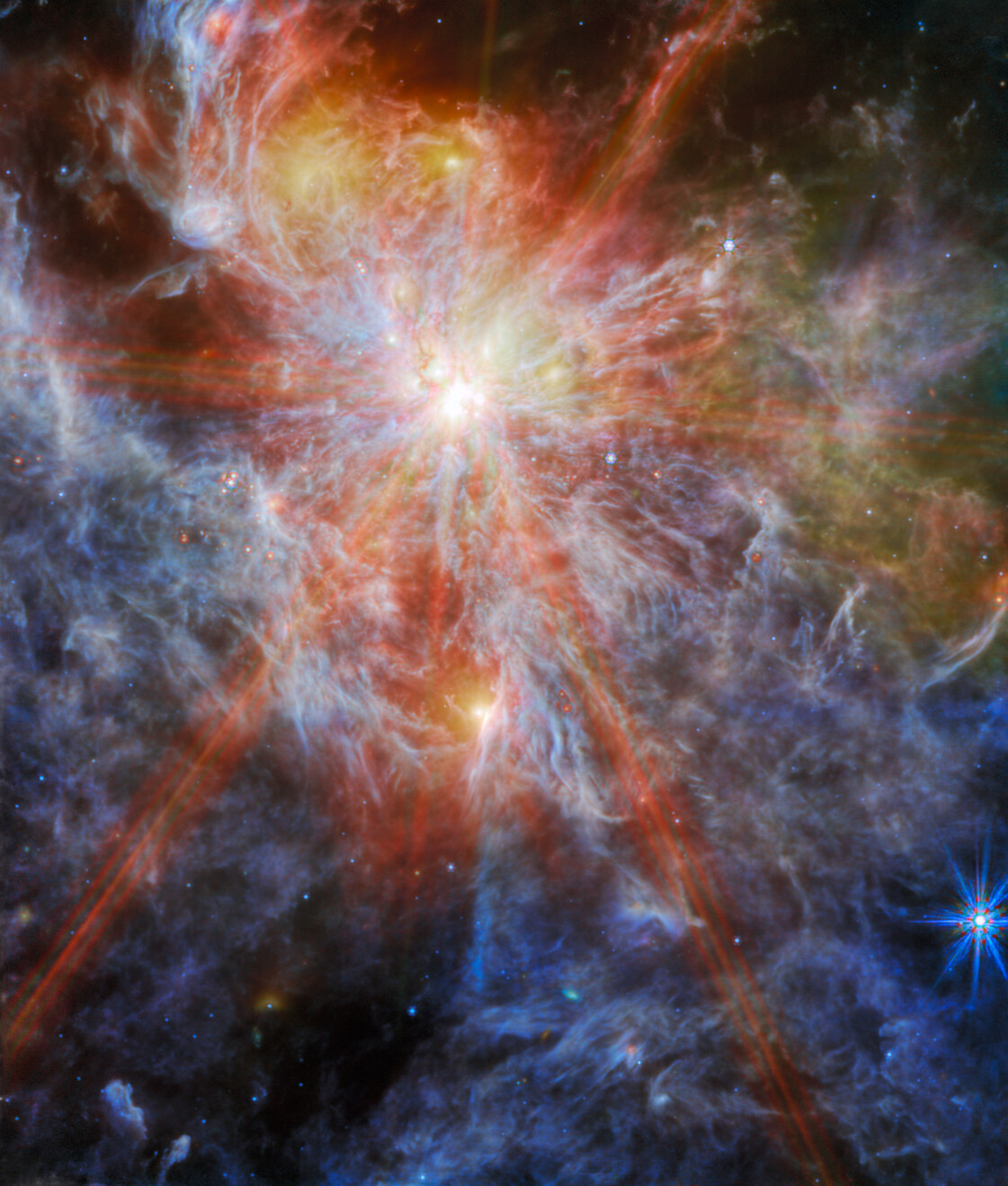
N79-S in mid-infrared with JWST. The bright object in the upper half contains the five most massive YSOs of the super star cluster.

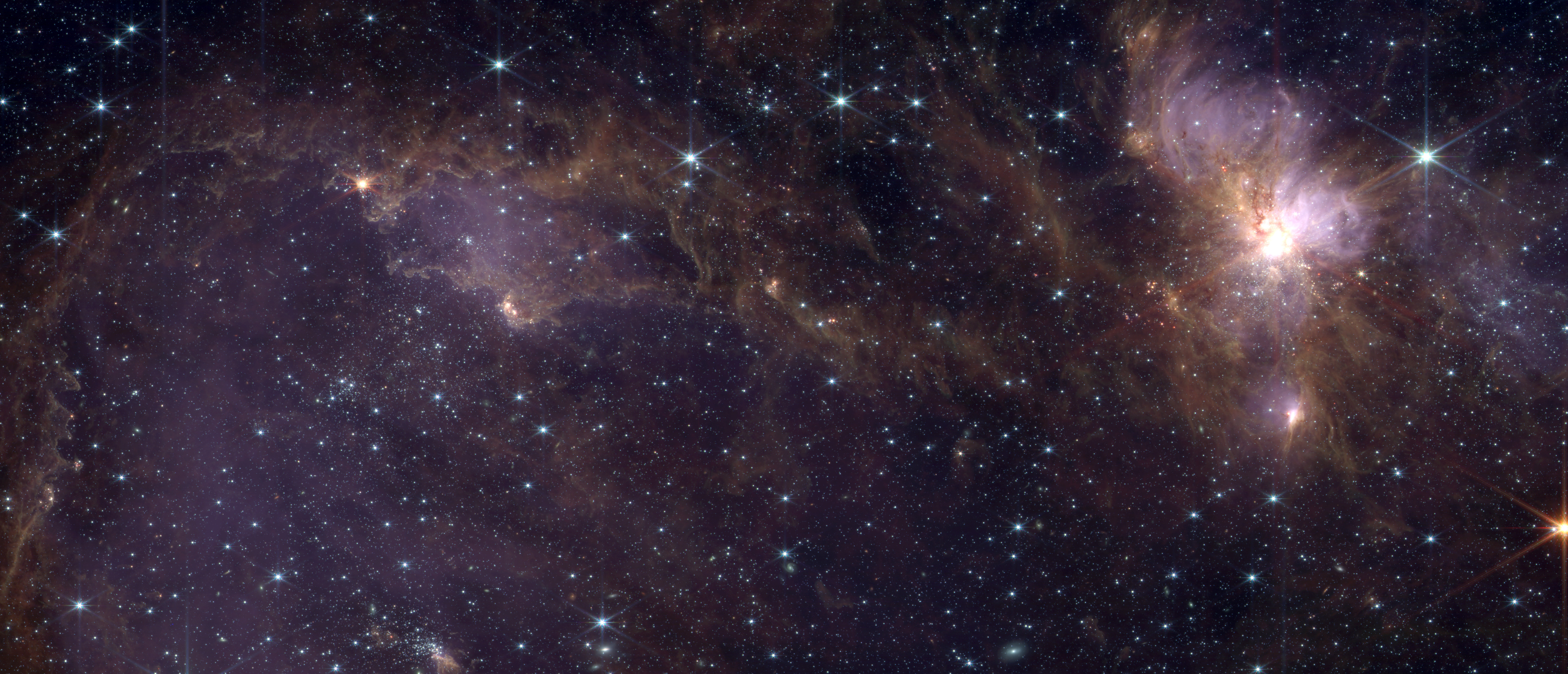
N79-S in near-infrared with JWST. The super star cluster is on the right (which overlaps with the HII-region NGC 1722). On the left is the star cluster NGC 1727.

== See also ==
- List of most massive stars
- NGC 2070 with central condensation R136 is another SSC in the Large Magellanic Cloud

Milky Way SSCs:

- Westerlund 1
- NGC 3603
