= Westerlund 1-20 =

Red supergiant star located in the Westerlund 1 super star cluster

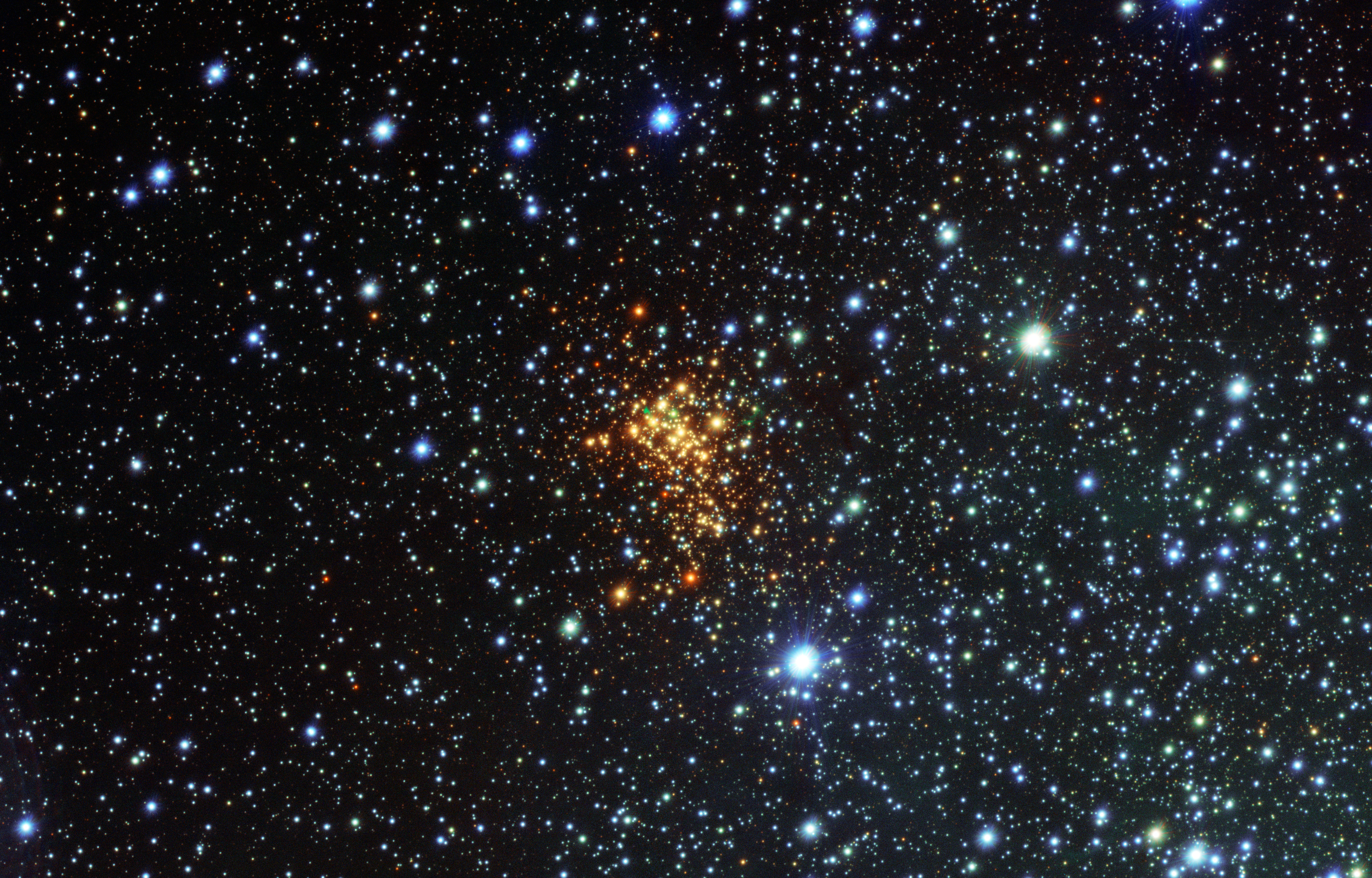
- Westerlund 1 super star cluster. The location of Wd 1-20 is circled. Credit: ESO

Observation data Epoch J2000 Equinox J2000
- Constellation: Ara
- Right ascension: 16^{h} 47^{m} 04.69^{s}
- Declination: −45° 51′ 23.9″

Characteristics
- Evolutionary stage: Red supergiant
- Spectral type: M3 - M6I
- Apparent magnitude (J): 6.378
- Apparent magnitude (H): 4.381
- Apparent magnitude (K): 2.61

Astrometry
Proper motion (μ)	RA: −2.478 mas/yr Dec.: −4.041 mas/yr
Parallax (π)	0.1690±0.1073 mas
Distance	2,600+600 −400 (assumed) pc

Details
Radius	858±48 R_{☉}
Luminosity	101,000±13,000 L_{☉}
Temperature	3,284 - 3,550 K

Other designations
- Westerlund 1 W20, Westerlund 1 BKS D, 2MASS J16470468-4551238, Gaia EDR3 5940106007092341120

Database references
SIMBAD	data

Westerlund 1-20 (abbreviated to Wd 1-20 or just W20) is a red supergiant (RSG) located in the Westerlund 1 super star cluster. Its radius was calculated to be around 965 solar radii (6.72 × 10^{8} km, 4.48 au), making it one of the largest stars discovered so far. This corresponds to a volume 899 million times bigger than the Sun. If placed at the center of the Solar System, the photosphere of Westerlund 1-20 would almost reach the orbit of Jupiter.

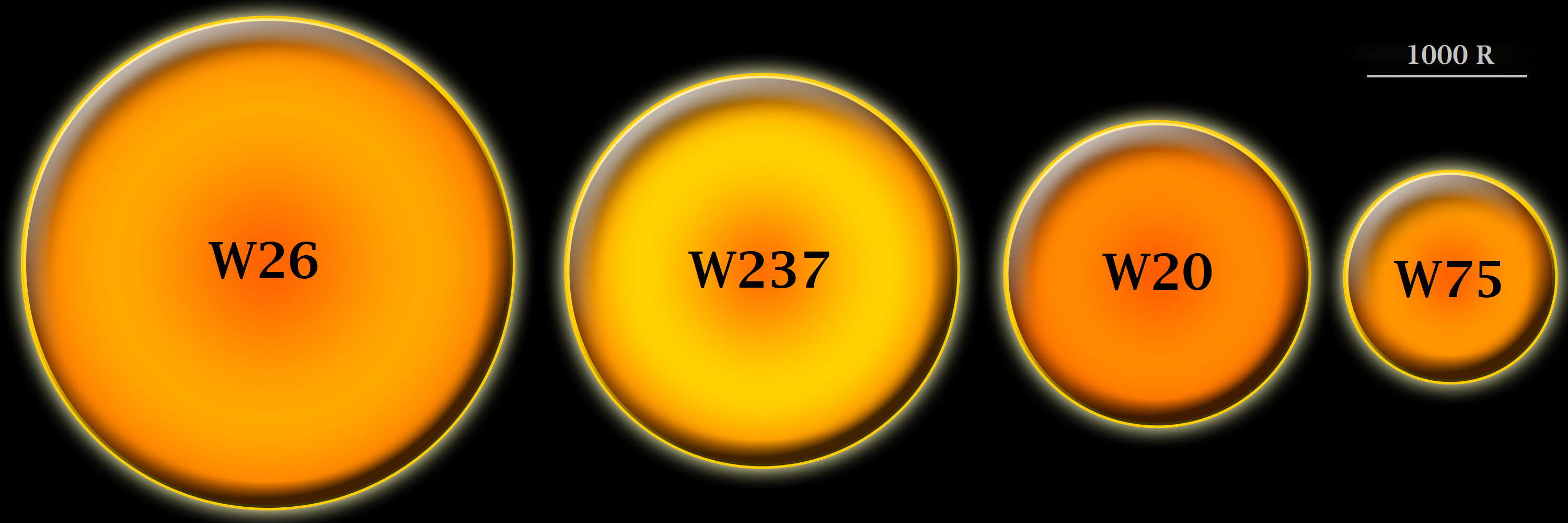
Westerlund 1-20 compared to the other 3 RSGs in the Westerlund 1 star cluster.

The star is classified as a luminous cool supergiant emitting most of its energy in the infrared spectrum. W20 occupies the upper right corner of the Hertzsprung-Russell diagram. Using the effective temperature of 3,500 K, the bolometric luminosity of 126,000 L_{☉} and the solar effective temperature of 5,772 K, its radius can be calculated using the Stefan-Boltzmann law. (Note: $\sqrt{\left(\frac{5772}{3500}\right)^4\cdot 125893}\approx964.98 \ R_\odot$)

Westerlund 1-20 was observed to have an extended, cometary shaped nebula, similar to the other red supergiant Westerlund 1 W26. It is therefore likely that its morphology was affected by either the intracluster medium or the cluster wind of Westerlund 1. The nebulae of both Westerlund 1-20 and Westerlund 1 W26 are extended outward from the cluster core and most bright at inward direction, indicating the outward cluster wind.

== See also ==
- Westerlund 1-237
- Westerlund 1-75
- List of largest known stars
