= Westerlund 1-243 =

Luminous blue variable star undergoing an eruptive phase in Westerlund 1

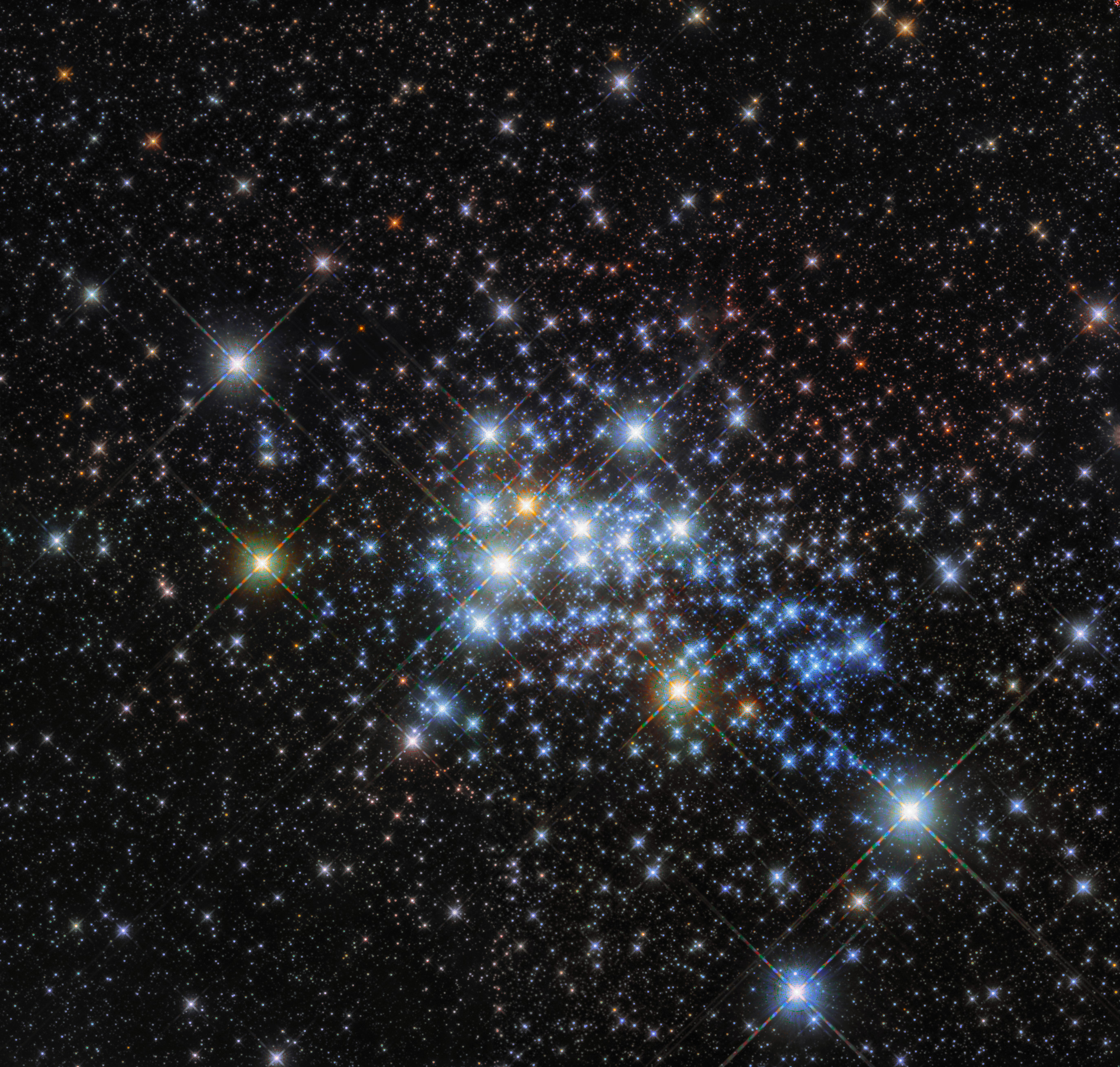
- Westerlund 1 super star cluster (north is towards top left). The location of Wd 1-243 is circled. Credit: ESO

Observation data Epoch J2000 Equinox J2000
- Constellation: Ara
- Right ascension: 16^{h} 47^{m} 7.5041^{s}
- Declination: −45° 52′ 29.123″
- Apparent magnitude (V): 15.807

Characteristics
- Spectral type: A3Ia+
- Apparent magnitude (J): 6.407
- Apparent magnitude (H): 5.271
- Apparent magnitude (K): 4.632

Astrometry
Proper motion (μ)	RA: −1.574 mas/yr Dec.: −4.036 mas/yr
Parallax (π)	0.0119±0.0812 mas
Distance	13,400 ly (4,120 pc)

Details
Mass	40 M_{☉}
Radius	376.9 R_{☉}
Luminosity	730,000 L_{☉}
Surface gravity (log g)	~0.65 cgs
Temperature	~8,500 K
Rotational velocity (v sin i)	10 km/s
Age	10.4+1.3 −1.2 Myr

Other designations
- Westerlund 1 W 243, Westerlund 1 BKS G, 2MASS J16470749-4552290, Gaia DR3 5940105830990286208

Database references
SIMBAD	data

Westerlund 1-243 or Wd 1-243 is a luminous blue variable (LBV) star undergoing an eruptive phase located within the outskirts of the super star cluster Westerlund 1. Located about 13,400 ly (4,100 pc) from Earth, it has a luminosity of 0.73 million L_{☉} making it one of the most luminous stars known.

== Observation ==
Westerlund 1-243 is the second brightest star in Westerlund 1, behind only Westerlund 1-4. It is one of several different hypergiant stars in Westerlund 1. It may also have a companion star, possibly an O-type supergiant.

=== Spectrum ===
Westerlund 1-243 displays a complex, time-varying spectrum with emission lines of hydrogen, helium and Lyman-α pumped metals, forbidden lines of nitrogen and iron, and a large number of absorption lines from neutral and singly-ionized metals. Many lines are complex emission/absorption blends, with significant spectral evolution occurring on timescales of just a few days.

== Properties ==
Westerlund 1-243 has a temperature of ~8,500 K determined from modelling the absorption line spectrum. It has expanded to a radius of 376.9 R_{☉}, and a Rosseland radius of 450 R_{☉}. It is radiating at a luminosity of 730,000 L_{☉}. It is losing mass at a rate of 6.1×10^{−7} M_{☉}/yr.

=== Evolution ===
Westerlund 1-243 is believed to be either in an advanced pre-red supergiant LBV phase, or has evolved through the RSG phase and returned to the blue side of the HR diagram. In the future it is expected to evolve toward a WR phase. The K-band spectrum also implies a higher temperature than that of a typical yellow hypergiant and suggests that Westerlund 1-243 may be evolving back towards a hotter state.
