= Westerlund 1-75 =

Red supergiant in the Westerlund 1 super star cluster

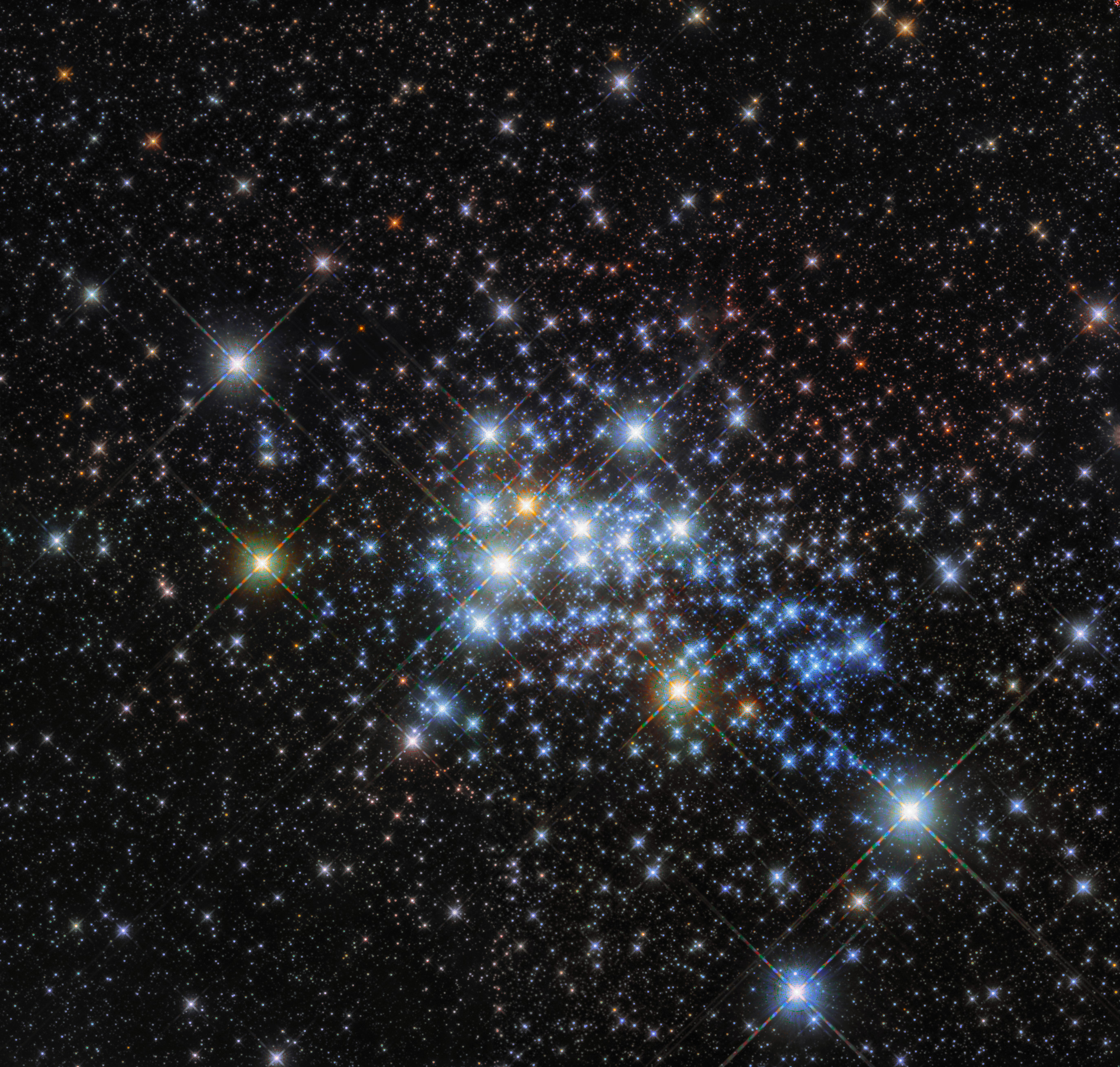
- Westerlund 1 super star cluster (north is towards top left). The location of Wd 1-75 is circled. Credit: ESO

Observation data Epoch J2000 Equinox J2000
- Constellation: Ara
- Right ascension: 16^{h} 47^{m} 08.92^{s}
- Declination: −45° 49′ 58.5″
- Apparent magnitude (V): 16.7

Characteristics
- Evolutionary stage: Red supergiant
- Spectral type: M1 - M4Ia
- Apparent magnitude (J): 6.933
- Apparent magnitude (H): 4.673
- Apparent magnitude (K): 3.28

Astrometry
Radial velocity (R_{v})	−50.6±2.9 km/s
Proper motion (μ)	RA: −2.029 mas/yr Dec.: −4.248 mas/yr
Parallax (π)	0.0893±0.1477 mas
Distance	4,120+660 −330 pc

Details
Radius	722±36 R_{☉}
Luminosity	120,000±14,000 L_{☉}
Temperature	3,600 - 4,000 K

Other designations
- Westerlund 1 BKS E, 2MASS J16470892-4549585, Gaia DR3 5940199877892579584

Database references
SIMBAD	data

Westerlund 1 W75 or Wd 1-75 is a red supergiant (RSG) located in the Westerlund 1 super star cluster. Its radius is calculated to be around 668 solar radii (4.65 × 10^{8} km, 3.10 au). This corresponds to a volume 298 million times bigger than the Sun. If placed at the center of the Solar System, Westerlund 1-75 would engulf the inner limits of the asteroid belt.

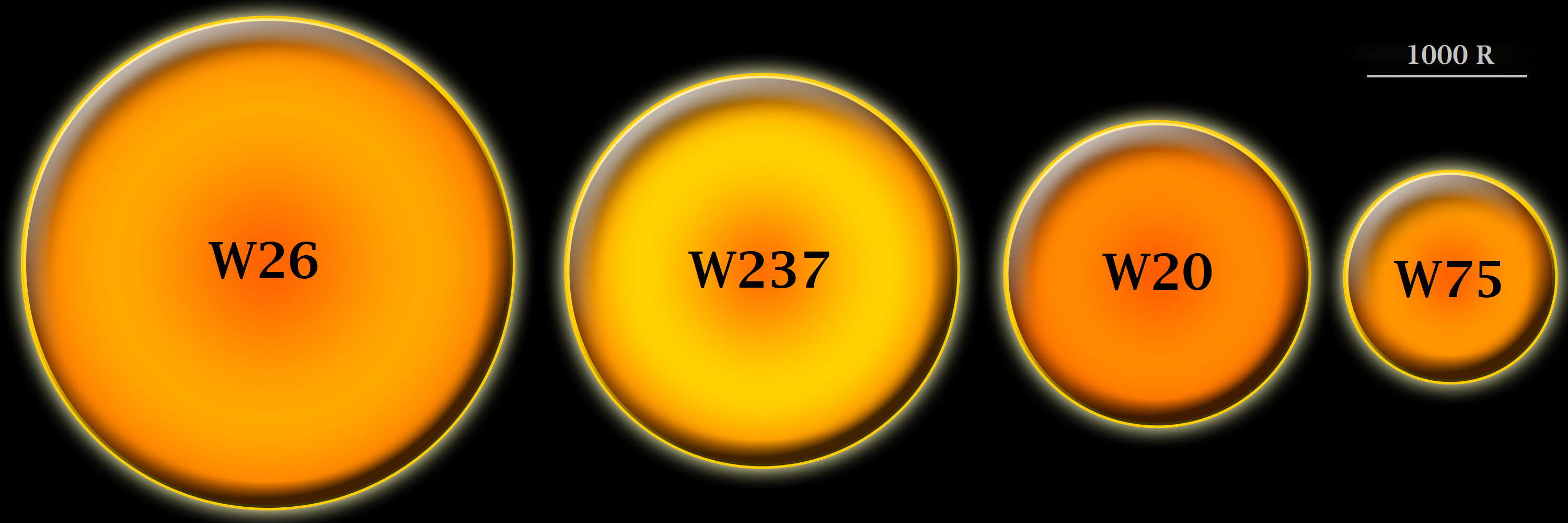
Westerlund 1-75 compared to the other 3 RSGs in the Westerlund 1 star cluster.

The star is classified as a luminous cool supergiant emitting most of its energy in the infrared spectrum. It occupies the upper right corner of the Hertzsprung-Russell diagram. Using the effective temperature of 3,600 K, the bolometric luminosity of 68,000 L_{☉} and the solar effective temperature of 5,772 K, the radius of Westerlund 1-75 can be calculated using the Stefan-Boltzmann law at 668 R_{☉}. (Note: $\sqrt{\left(\frac{5772}{3600}\right)^4\cdot 10^{4.83}}\approx668.42 \ R_\odot$)

Like Westerlund 1-20, Westerlund 1 W26 and Westerlund 1-237, Westerlund 1-75 was observed to be a radio source, however it is weakest along the RSGs in its cluster and remains unresolved at any wavelength.

Westerlund 1-75 is surrounded by extended nebula, although it appears less massive than nebulae around typical red supergiant stars.

== See also ==
- List of largest known stars
