= NGC 6621 =

Interacting galaxy in the constellation Draco

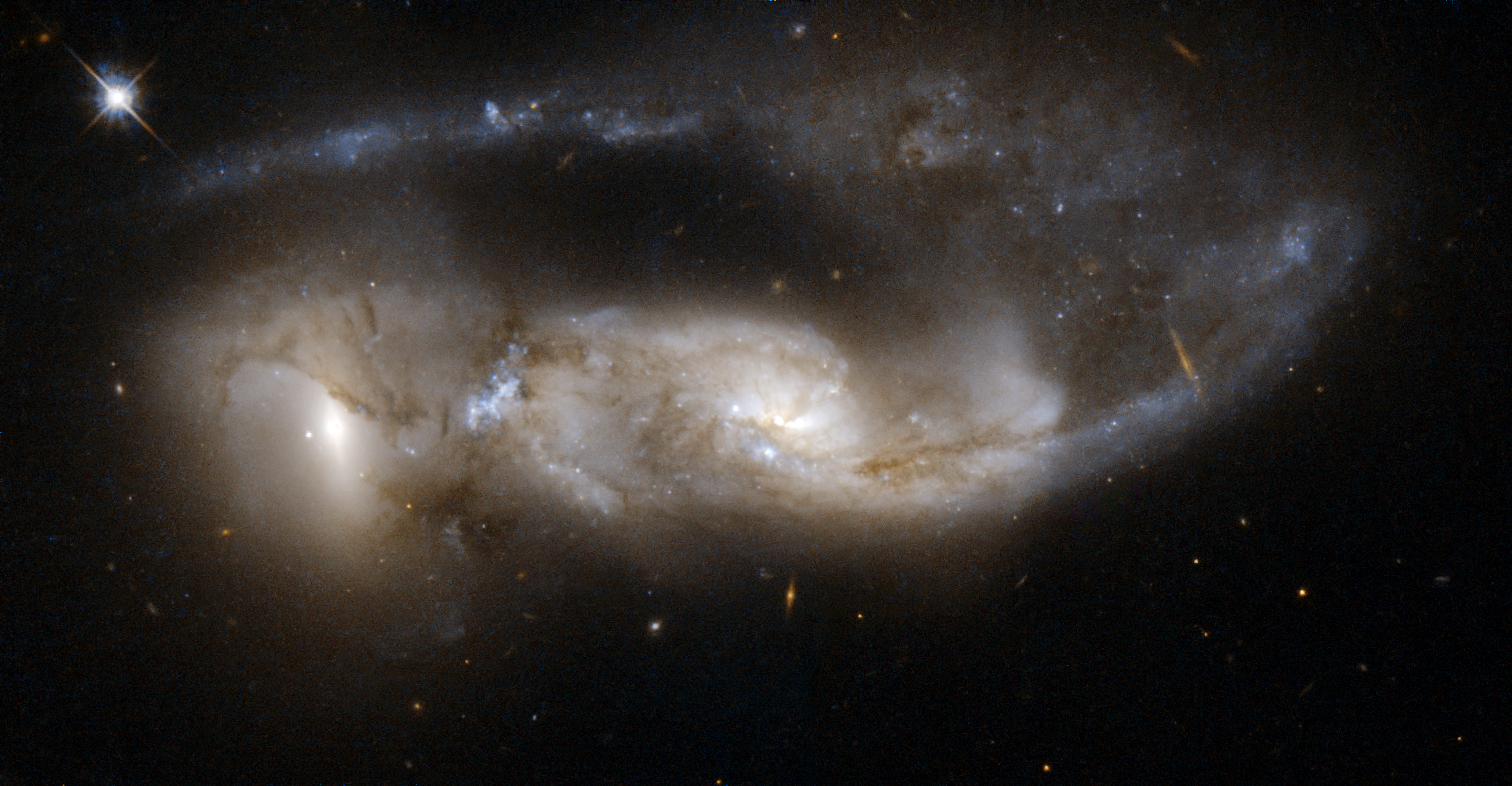
- Hubble Space Telescope image of NGC 6621 (center) and NGC 6622 (left)

Observation data (J2000 epoch)
- Constellation: Draco
- Right ascension: 18^{h} 12^{m} 55^{s}
- Declination: +68° 21′ 48″
- Redshift: 0.020652 ± 0.000007
- Heliocentric radial velocity: 6191 ± 2
- Distance: 265 Mly (81 Mpc)
- Apparent magnitude (B): 13.6

Characteristics
- Type: Sb pec
- Apparent size (V): 1.9′ × 0.7′

Other designations
- Arp 81, UGC 11175, MCG +11-22-030, PGC 61582, CGCG 322-036, VV 247a

NGC 6621 is an interacting spiral galaxy in the constellation Draco. It lies at a distance of about 260 million light-years. NGC 6621 interacts with NGC 6622, with their closest approach having taken place about 100 million years ago. The pair was discovered by Edward D. Swift and Lewis A. Swift on June 2, 1885. Originally NGC 6621 was assigned to the southeast galaxy, but now it refers to the northern one. NGC 6621 and NGC 6622 are included in the Atlas of Peculiar Galaxies as Arp 81 in the category "spiral galaxies with large high surface brightness companions".

NGC 6621 is the larger of the two, and is a very disturbed spiral galaxy. The encounter has pulled a long tail out of NGC 6621 that has now wrapped at the north behind its body. The collision has also triggered extensive star formation between the two galaxies. The most intense star formation takes place in the region between the two nuclei, where a large population of luminous clusters, also known as super star clusters, has been observed. At this region is observed the most tidal stress. Many large clusters are also observed in the tail and the nucleus of NGC 6621. The brightest and bluest clusters are less than 100 million years old, with the youngest being less than 10 million years old. The side of the galaxy further from the companion features noticeably less star formation activity.

NGC 6621 is characterised as a luminous infrared galaxy, with its infrared luminosity being 10^{11.24} L_{☉}. NGC 6621 contributes nearly all of the radio and far infrared flux of the pair. When observed in H-alpha, the centre of the galaxy has two bright sources separated by 3 arcseconds, with the southwest being brighter while the northeastern one coincides with the nucleus of NGC 6621.

== Supernovae ==
Two supernovae have been detected in NGC 6621:

- SN 2010hi (type unknown, mag. 18), was discovered by Ron Arbour on 1 September 2010, lying 30" east and 4" north of the center of the galaxy.
- SN 2019hsx (Type Ic-BL, mag. 18.62), was discovered by the Zwicky Transient Facility on 2 June 2019.

== See also ==
- List of NGC objects (6001–7000)
