= Westerlund 1 W237 =

Star in the constellation Ara

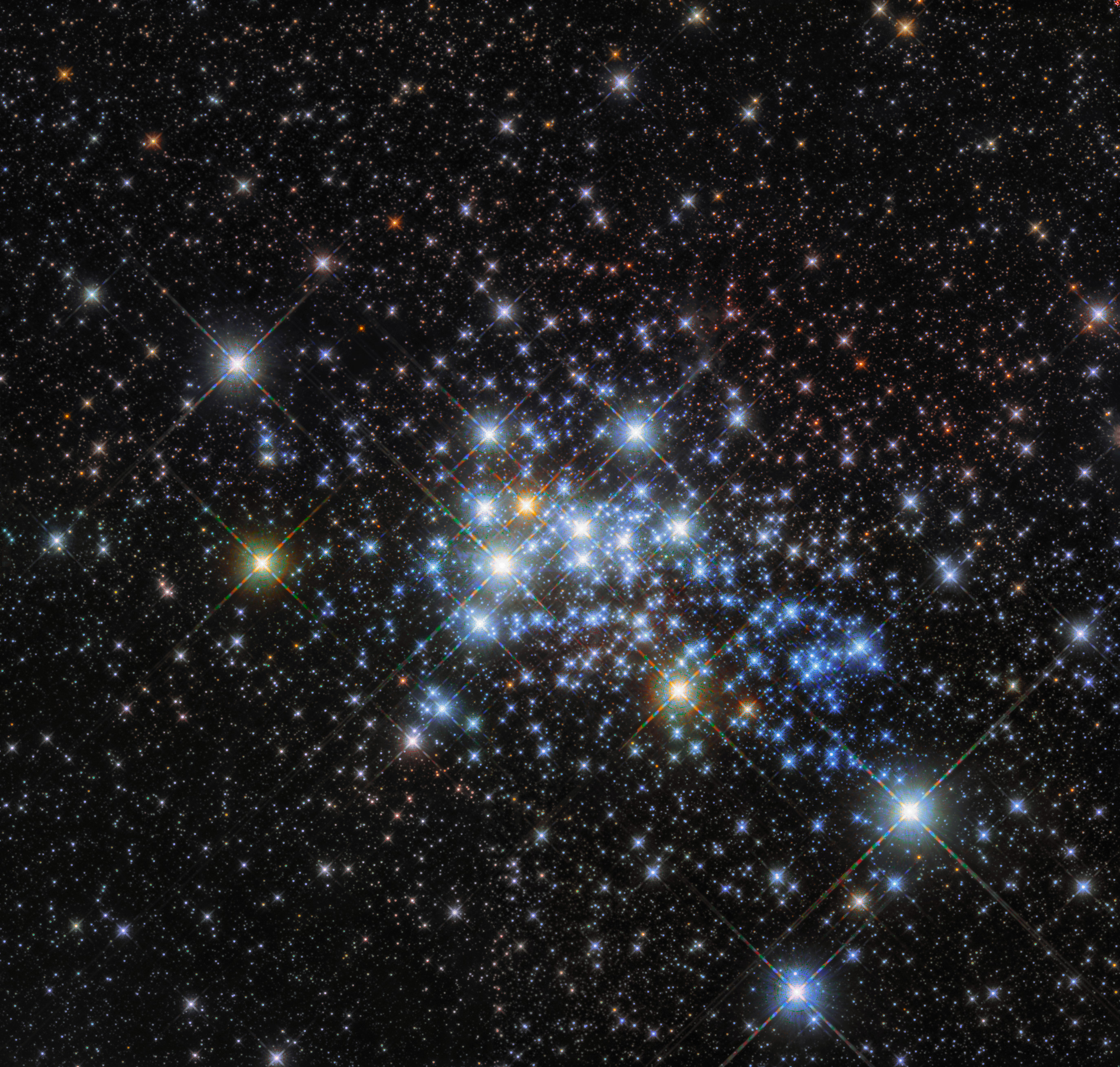
- Westerlund 1 super star cluster (north is towards top left). The location of Wd 1-237 is circled. Credit: ESO

Observation data Epoch J2000 Equinox J2000
- Constellation: Ara
- Right ascension: 16^{h} 47^{m} 03.1075^{s}
- Declination: −45° 52′ 18.957″
- Apparent magnitude (V): 19.008

Characteristics
- Evolutionary stage: Either a red supergiant or a foreground giant
- Spectral type: M3Ia or M6^{+} III
- Apparent magnitude (R): 13.634
- Apparent magnitude (G): 11.259
- Apparent magnitude (J): 5.075
- Apparent magnitude (H): 3.01
- Apparent magnitude (K): 2.18

Astrometry
Proper motion (μ)	RA: −3.09±0.15 mas/yr Dec.: −4.12±0.12 mas/yr
Parallax (π)	0.3370±0.1235 mas
Distance	3,000 pc
Absolute magnitude (M_{V})	−6.96

Details
Radius	1,241±70 R_{☉}
Luminosity	219,000±26,000 L_{☉}
Temperature	3,550 - 3,605 K
Age	7.9 Myr

Other designations
- Westerlund 1 W237, Westerlund 1 BKS B, 2MASS J16470309-4552189, Gaia DR3 5940105904023386752

Database references
SIMBAD	data

Westerlund 1 W237 (commonly abbreviated to W237), also known as Westerlund 1 BKS B, is a red supergiant (RSG) in the constellation of Ara. It is one out of four known red supergiants in the Westerlund 1 super star cluster and one of the largest known stars and one of the most luminous of its type.

== Physical characteristics ==
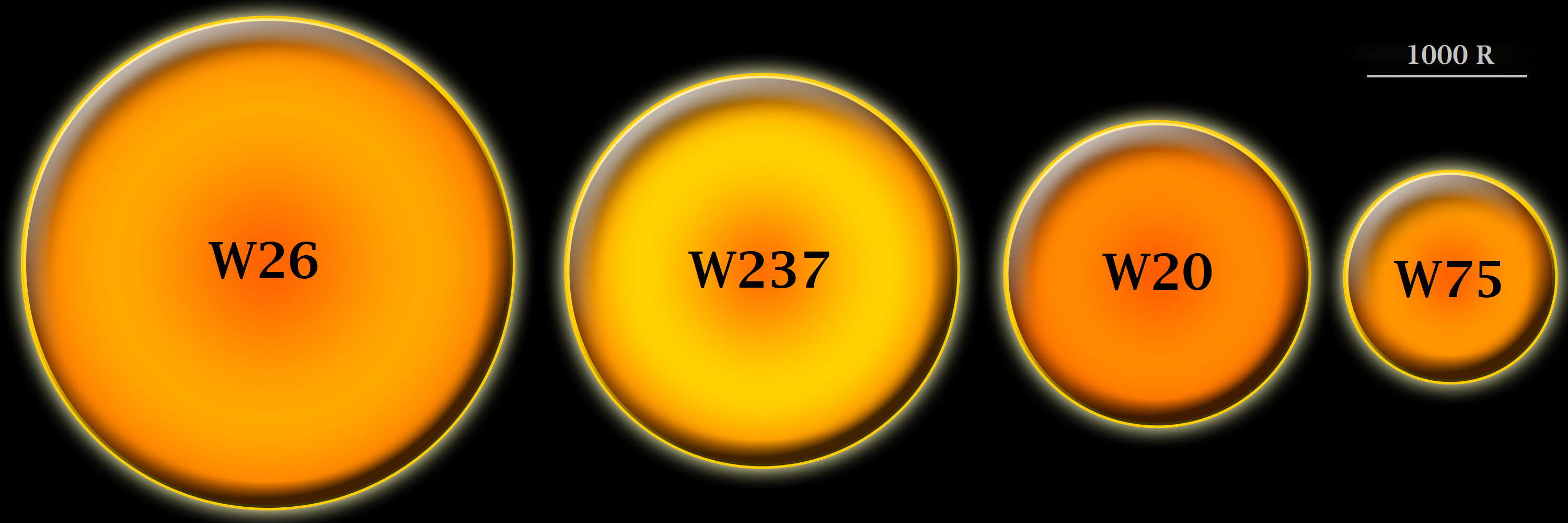
Westerlund 1 W237 compared to the other 3 RSGs (Red Supergiants) in the Westerlund 1 star cluster.

Westerlund 1 W237 is classified as a luminous cool supergiant emitting most of its energy in the infrared spectrum. It is surrounded by a radio nebula which is similar in mass to those of Westerlund 1-20 and Westerlund 1 W26, and moreover directly comparable to that of VY Canis Majoris. The elliptical structure of this nebula however indicates that it has been less affected by the cluster wind of Westerlund 1 (W20 and W26 have pronounced cometary shaped nebulae). The outflow velocity for the RSG wind is assumed to be around 30 km/s. The nebula itself seems to have a mass of 0.07 M_{☉} and a radius of about 0.11 parsecs. This results in a kinematic age around 3,600 years and a time averaged mass loss rate of 2×10^{−5} M_{☉} per year.

The star occupies the upper right corner of the Hertzsprung-Russell diagram. With an effective temperature of 3,550 K and a bolometric luminosity of 219,000 L_{☉}, the radius of Westerlund 1 W237 would be 1,241 times the solar radius (R_{☉}), making it larger than the orbit of Jupiter. The initial mass of W237 has been calculated from its position relative to theoretical stellar evolutionary tracks to be around 28 M_{☉} or 32 M_{☉} for a non-rotating star.

== Distance ==
The distance of Westerlund 1 W237 is assumed to be around 8,500+2,000
−1,300 light years or 2,600+600
−400 parsecs based on it being commonly thought of as a member of the Westerlund 1 star cluster (the elliptical shape of its nebula indicates that it might not be near the center of W1, while other RSGs like W20 and W26 are). Another but older source suggests a similar distance of 3,000±500 parsecs.

Westerlund's 1987 analysis assigned a spectral type of M6^{+} III to W237 and considered it to be a foreground giant with a luminosity only around 1,000 L_{☉}. Gaia Data Release 2 gives a parallax of 1.64±0.2608 mas for W237, implying a distance of 623+139
−96 pc and a luminosity of 7,178–7,379 L_{☉} with a corresponding radius of 216 R_{☉}. In 2020, Gaia DR3 revised the parallax to the much smaller value of 0.3370±0.1235 mas, corresponding to a distance of 2,967±1,087 pc (9,670±3,540 ly). Both Gaia results carry significant statistical margin of error, as well as indicators that the astrometric excess noise is far beyond acceptable levels so that the parallax estimates should be considered unreliable.

== See also ==
- Mu Cephei
- Stephenson 2 DFK 1 – Another luminous red supergiant part of Stephenson 2 once considered to be a possible foreground or unrelated star
- Westerlund 1-75
