= NGC 6622 =

Interacting galaxy in the constellation Draco

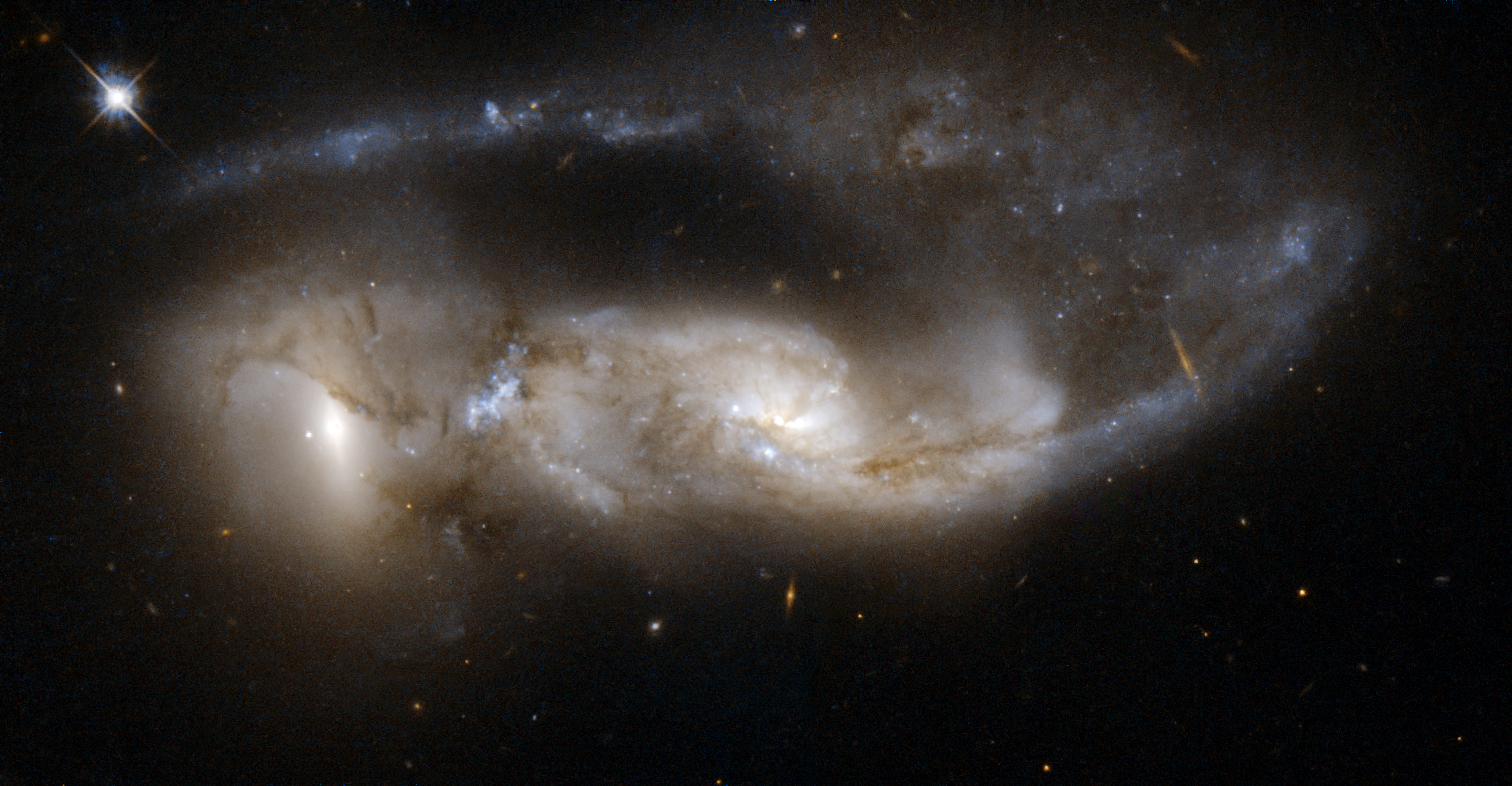
- Hubble Space Telescope image of NGC 6622 (left) and NGC 6621 (center)

Observation data (J2000 epoch)
- Constellation: Draco
- Right ascension: 18^{h} 12^{m} 59.50^{s}
- Declination: +68° 21′ 19.0″
- Redshift: 0.02157±0.00013
- Distance: 313 Mly (96.0 Mpc)
- Apparent magnitude (V): 15.0

Characteristics
- Type: G'Sb
- Size: 219,000 ly
- Apparent size (V): .955 x .832
- Notable features: N/A

Other designations
- KCPG 534A, PGC 61579, KPG 534b, LEDA 61579, UGC 11175 S, UZC J181259.8+682114

NGC 6622 is an interacting spiral galaxy in the constellation Draco. It is located around 313 million light-years away, and it was discovered by Edward D. Swift and Lewis A. Swift on June 2, 1885. NGC 6622 interacts with NGC 6621, with their closest approach having taken place about 100 million years before the moment seen now. NGC 6622 and NGC 6621 are included in the Atlas of Peculiar Galaxies as Arp 81 in the category "spiral galaxies with large high surface brightness companions".

NGC 6622 is the smaller of the two, and is a very disturbed galaxy. The encounter has left NGC 6622 very deformed, as it was once a spiral galaxy. The collision has also triggered extensive star formation between the two galaxies. The most intense star formation takes place in the region between the two nuclei, where a large population of luminous clusters, also known as super star clusters, has been observed. At this region is observed the most tidal stress. The brightest and bluest clusters are less than 100 million years old, with the youngest being less than 10 million years old. The side of the galaxy further from the companion features noticeably less star formation activity.
