= Westerlund 1 W26 =

Star in the constellation Ara

- Westerlund 1 W26 is the brightest star in the center of this image. Credit: HST

Observation data Epoch J2000 Equinox J2000
- Constellation: Ara
- Right ascension: 16^{h} 47^{m} 05.403^{s}
- Declination: −45° 50′ 36.76″
- Apparent magnitude (V): 17.194

Characteristics
- Evolutionary stage: Red supergiant or hypergiant
- Spectral type: M0.5–M6 (M2-M6Ia)
- Apparent magnitude (B): 22.1
- Apparent magnitude (J): 4.31
- Apparent magnitude (H): 1.35
- Apparent magnitude (K): 1.9
- B−V color index: +4.906

Astrometry
Radial velocity (R_{v})	-49.42 km/s
Proper motion (μ)	RA: -1.841 mas/yr Dec.: -3.909 mas/yr
Distance	14,200 ly (4,350 pc)

Details
Radius	1,145–1,240 R_{☉}
Luminosity	275,000–288,000 L_{☉}
Temperature	3,782±14 K
Age	7.9 Myr

Other designations
- Westerlund 1 W26, W1–26, Westerlund 1 BKS AS, Westerlund 1 BKS A, 2MASS J16470540-4550367, Gaia DR3 5940106041452150272

Database references
SIMBAD	data

Westerlund 1 W26 (commonly abbreviated to W26) or Westerlund 1 BKS AS is a red supergiant or hypergiant (RSG or RHG) star located at the outskirts of the Westerlund 1 super star cluster. It is one of the largest known stars and the most luminous supergiant stars discovered so far with radius calculated to be in excess of a thousand times the solar radius, and a luminosity of over 200,000 times the solar luminosity. If placed at the center of the Solar System, its photosphere would engulf the orbit of Jupiter.

== Discovery ==
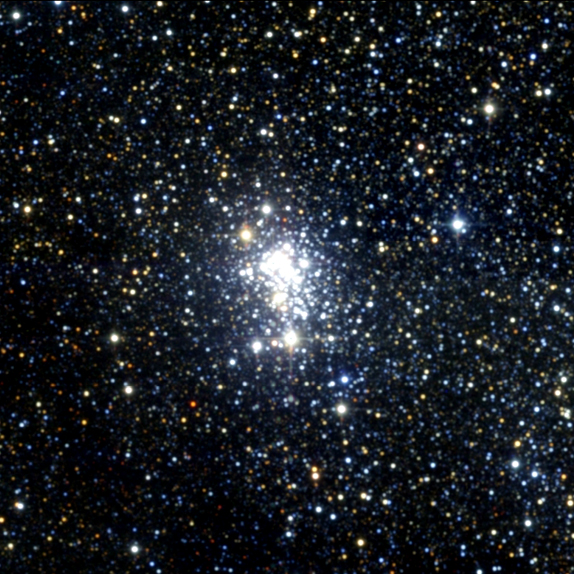
Westerlund 1 in infrared from 2MASS

Westerlund 1 was discovered by Bengt Westerlund in 1961 during an infrared survey in the Zone of Avoidance of the sky, and described as "a heavily reddened cluster in Ara". The spectral types of the component stars could not be determined at the time except for the brightest star which was tentatively considered type M.

In 1969, Borgman, Kornneef, and Slingerland conducted a photometric survey of the cluster and assigned letters to the stars they measured. This star, identified as a strong radio source, was given the letter "A". This leads to the designation Westerlund 1 BKS A as used by Simbad, although the cluster was not known as Westerlund 1 at that time. At the time it was referred to as Ara A, with another strong radio source in the cluster called Ara C. Its brightness in the radio spectrum makes it one of the rare "radio stars". Westerlund made spectroscopic observations of the cluster, still not known as Westerlund 1, published in 1987 and numbered the stars, giving the number 26 and the spectral type M2I. Westerlund also discovered multiple red supergiants residing in the Large Magellanic Cloud (along with few foreground stars) in the constellation Dorado, most notably including WOH G64 A and HV 888 (WOH S140).

Modern terminology stems from 1998 when the cluster was referred to as Westerlund 1 (Wd1), with a paper describing Ara A as star 26 and Ara C as star 9.

== Physical characteristics ==
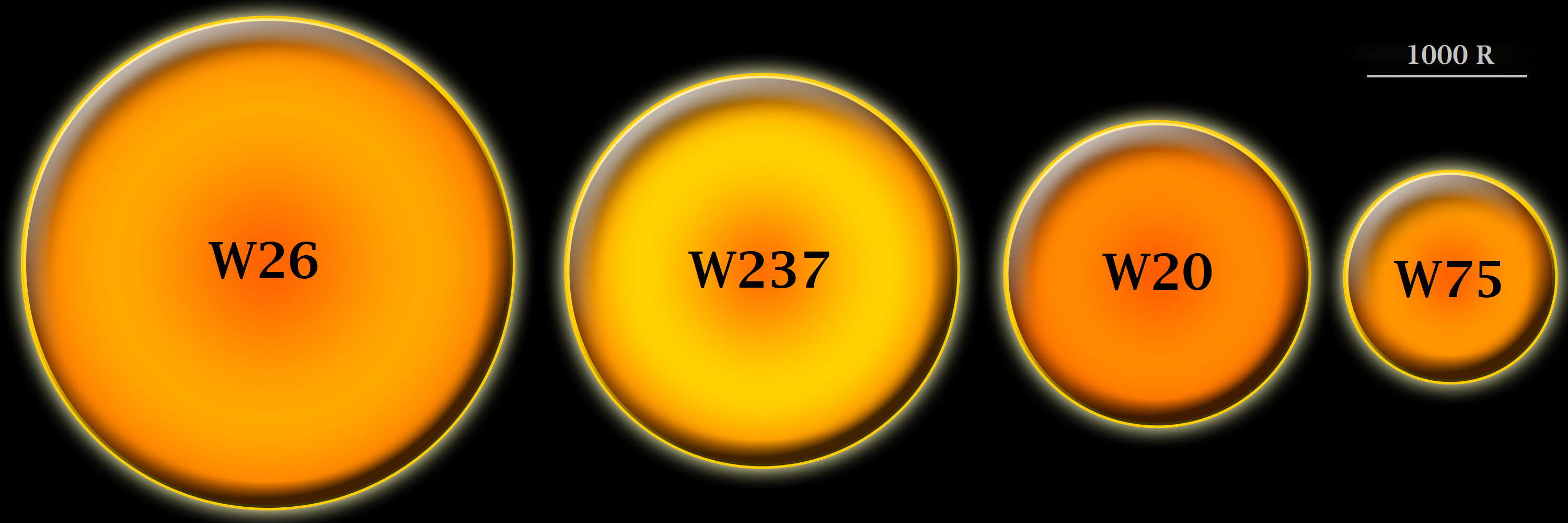
W26 compared to the other 3 RSGs (including the putative W237, W20, and W75) in the Westerlund 1 star cluster.

W26 is classified as a luminous cool supergiant. It occupies the upper right corner of the Hertzsprung–Russell diagram. The cool temperature means it emits a significant part of its energy in the infrared spectrum. The star is almost obscured at visible wavelengths by extinction of around 13 magnitudes due to interstellar dust, hence it has been studied extensively in the longer infrared to radio wavelengths, which made it easier to study. Based on radii estimates of over 1,500 R_{☉} from 2013, it has also been described as the largest star known, despite other known candidates (such as VY Canis Majoris and WOH G64 A) and as well as larger estimates given for few other red supergiants by that time, such as notably UY Scuti.

W26's spectral type identifies it as a red star with a high luminosity. It has also been observed to change its spectral class (and thus its temperature) during several periods, but has not been seen to change its luminosity. Spectral variability is not a common feature amongst red supergiants, although other notable examples include VX Sagittarii and HV 11423. This suggests that the star is out of hydrostatic equilibrium in the Hayashi forbidden zone, resulting in huge mass loss of atmospheric material. All of these indicate that it is a highly evolved red supergiant experiencing extreme levels of mass loss and may further evolve into a hotter supergiant. Its stellar wind contains molecular components, with H_{2}O and SiO masers having velocities consistent with those of a red supergiant. Despite that, those masers are much less intense than other nearby and isolated red hypergiants, possibly due to environmental disturbances from its parent cluster.

In 2013, the bolometric luminosity of W26 has been calculated from its K-band infrared brightness to be 380,000 or 320,000 times higher than the sun's (L_{☉}), depending on the spectral type between M2 and M5. These luminosities imply a radius 1,530 or 1,580 times the Sun's radius (R_{☉}) based on assumed effective temperatures of 3,660 or 3,450 K for spectral types M2 and M5 respectively. These parameters make W26 one of the most luminous and latest red supergiants and are similar to those estimated for another notable red supergiant star, VY Canis Majoris. This is also consistent with W26 experiencing a greater level of instability and a mass-loss rate higher than any typical red supergiant.

An earlier calculation of the luminosity and the temperature by fitting the spectral energy distribution and based on the spectrum by using the DUSTY model gave a far higher luminosity near 1,100,000 L_{☉}, considerably more luminous than expected for a red supergiant. The model also gave a photospheric temperature of 3,700 K, corresponding to a radius of 2,519 R_{☉}, leading to a volume 16 billion times bigger than the Sun. (Note: Applying the Stefan-Boltzmann Law with a nominal solar effective temperature of 5,772 K: $\sqrt{(5,772/3,700)^4 * 10^{6.03}} = 2,519.12\ R\odot$) This makes W26 having the most extreme properties with among all selected red supergiants in a sample (which includes other Wd 1 RSGs), with the putative Stephenson 2 DFK 1 being second.

=== Surroundings ===
In October 2013, astronomers using the European Southern Observatory's Very Large Survey Telescope (VST) discovered that W26 is surrounded by a glowing cloud of ionized hydrogen. This is the first ionized nebula to have been discovered around a red supergiant star through its optical emission lines, and follows the discovery of an ionized nebula around NML Cygni in 1982. The nebula extends 1.30 parsecs (pc) from the star. The nebulae of both Westerlund 1 W20 and W26 are extended outward from the cluster core and most bright at inward direction, indicating the outward cluster wind. A later study analyzed the ejecta surrounding some of Westerlund 1's stars; the study determined the mass of W26's ejecta to be 403×10^{−3} M_{☉}, with an uncertainty of ± 94×10^{−3} M_{☉}.

== See also ==
- Mu Cephei
- RSGC1
  - RSGC1-F01
  - RSGC1-F02
  - RSGC1-F13
