= CXOU J164710.2−455216 =

Anomalous X-ray pulsar in Westerlund 1

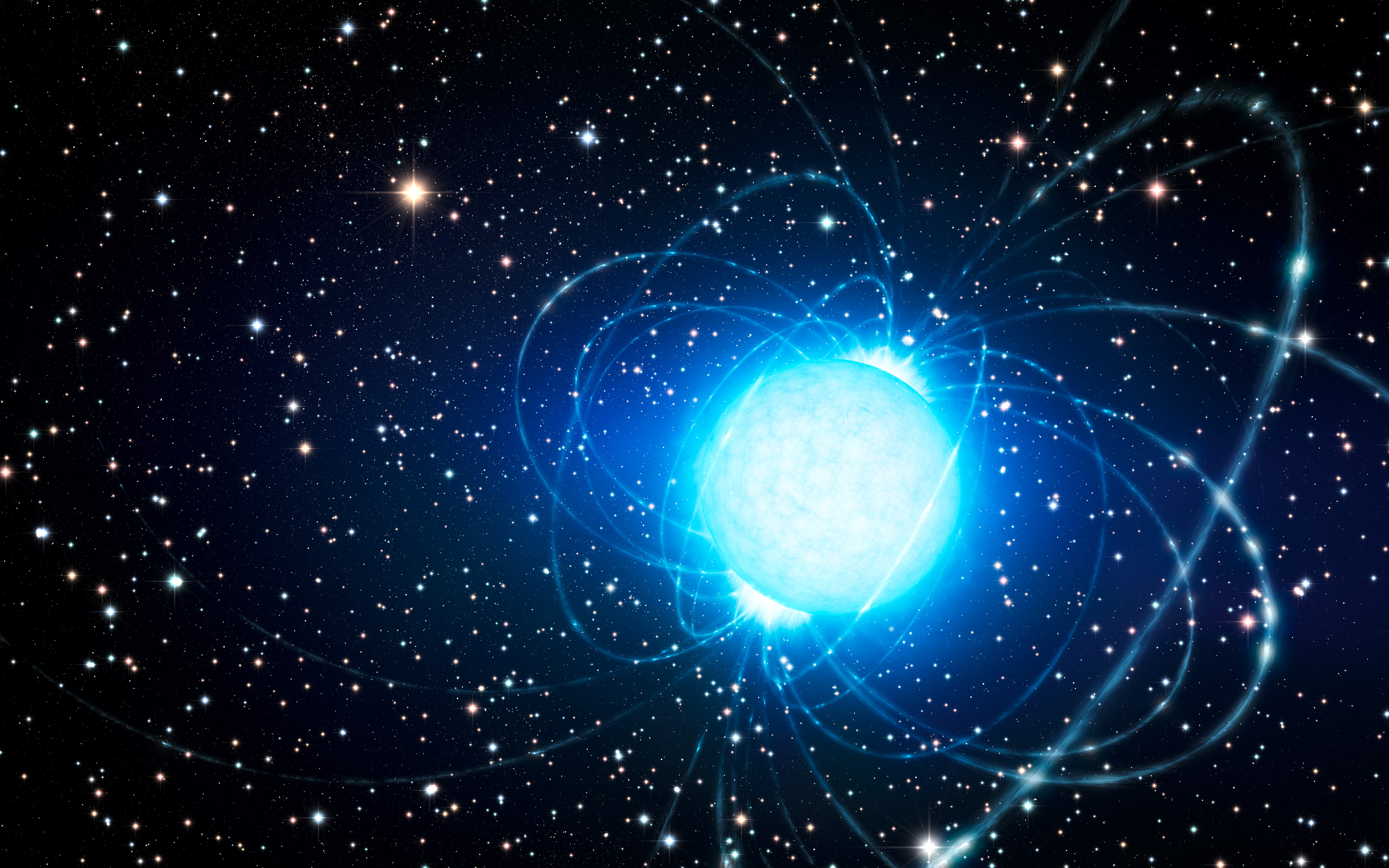
- Artist's impression of CXOU J164710.2-455216

Observation data Epoch J2000.0 Equinox ICRS
- Constellation: Ara
- Right ascension: 16^{h} 47^{m} 10.20^{s}
- Declination: −45° 52′ 16.8″

Characteristics
- Evolutionary stage: Neutron star
- Apparent magnitude ($\begin{smallmatrix}K_s \end{smallmatrix}$): >18.5

Astrometry
Distance	approx. 16,000 ly (approx. 5,000 pc)

Details
Rotation	10.6105(1)s

Other designations
- CXO J164710.20−455217, CXOU J164710.2−455217

Database references
SIMBAD	data

CXOU J164710.2−455216 is an anomalous X-ray pulsar and magnetar in the massive galactic open cluster Westerlund 1. It is the brightest X-ray source in the cluster, and was discovered in 2005 in observations made by the Chandra X-ray Observatory. The Westerlund 1 cluster is believed to have formed in a single burst of star formation, implying that the progenitor star must have had a mass in excess of 40 solar masses. The fact that a neutron star was formed instead of a black hole implies that more than 95% of the star's original mass must have been lost before or during the supernova that produced the magnetar.

On 21 September 2006 the Swift satellite detected a 20ms soft gamma-ray burst in Westerlund 1. Fortuitously, XMM-Newton observations had been made four days earlier, and repeat observations 1.5 days after the burst revealed the magnetar to be the source of the burst, with the X-ray luminosity increasing by a factor of 100 during the outburst.
