= B90 (star) =

Red supergiant star in the constellation Dorado

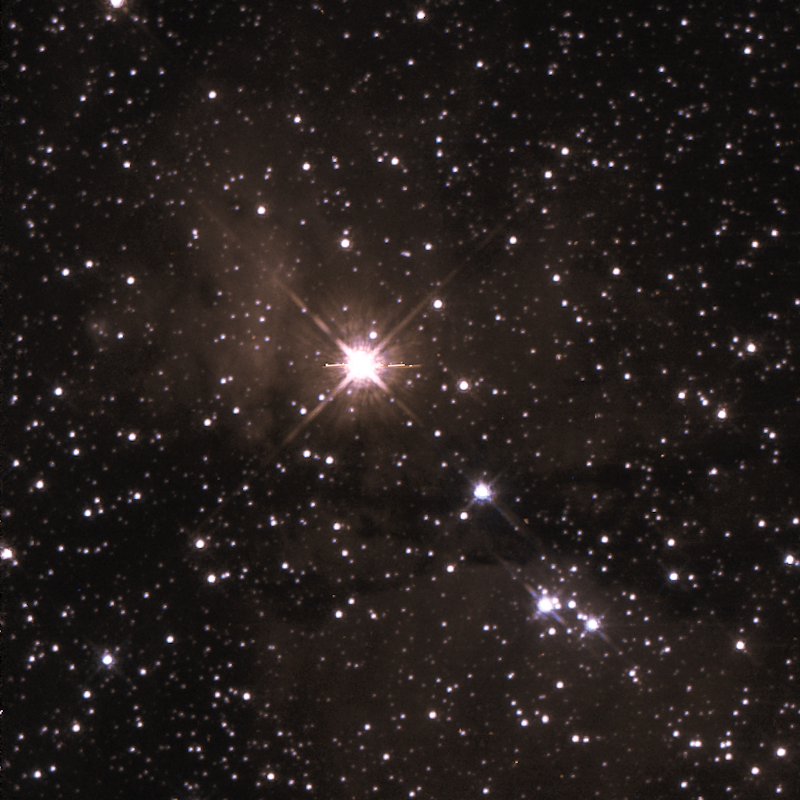
- HST image of B90; the star can be seen near the centre.

Observation data Epoch J2000.0 Equinox ICRS
- Constellation: Dorado
- Right ascension: 05^{h} 24^{m} 19.3095^{s}
- Declination: −69° 38′ 49.374″
- Apparent magnitude (V): 14.271±0.194

Characteristics
- Evolutionary stage: Extreme red supergiant
- Spectral type: M3−4 I
- Apparent magnitude (U): 19.519
- Apparent magnitude (B): 16.688
- Apparent magnitude (R): 11
- Apparent magnitude (G): 12.135779±0.004246
- Apparent magnitude (I): 10.804±0.105
- Apparent magnitude (J): 8.360±0.018
- Apparent magnitude (H): 7.375±0.038
- Apparent magnitude (K): 6.809±0.023
- Variable type: SRc

Astrometry
| Radial velocity (R_{v}) | 263.49±1.02 km/s |
| Proper motion (μ) | RA: 1.913±0.037 mas/yr Dec.: 0.411±0.034 mas/yr |
| Parallax (π) | 0.0457±0.027 mas |
| Distance | 45,590 pc |

Details
| Mass | 25 (initial) M_{☉} |
| Radius | 1,210 R_{☉} |
| Luminosity | 209,000±5,000 L_{☉} |
| Surface gravity (log g) | −0.2+0.20 −0.30 cgs |
| Temperature | 3,550±40 K |
| Metallicity | 0.0+0.2 −0.1 dex |

Other designations
- WOH S264, LI-LMC 976, MSX LMC 461, RM 1-339, SP77 47-10

Database references
| SIMBAD | data |

B90 (often referred to as [W60] B90) is a large and highly luminous red supergiant star similar to Betelgeuse in the Large Magellanic Cloud. It is one of the largest known stars and also one of the most luminous of its type.

== Discovery ==
B90 was discovered in 1956 by Karl Gordon Henize in a catalogue of H-alpha emission stars and nebulae in the Large Magellanic Cloud. He designated it LHA 120-N 132E, indicating emission line nebula 132E on plate 120. The LHA is originally LHα, standing for H-alpha emission objects identified at the Lamont-Hussey Observatory.

== Properties ==
B90 is believed to be one of the largest and most luminous red supergiants in the Large Magellanic Cloud. Its luminosity was first measured to be of more than 280,000 solar luminosities (L_{☉}) and a radius of around 1,390 solar radii (R_{☉}), although a more detailed study put it at 209,000 L_{☉} and 1,210 R_{☉}.

=== Mass-loss ===
The star has episodic mass-loss with a high rate of 4.4+5.1
−1.7×10^{−6} M_{☉} yr^{−1} and a nebula of ~1 pc (~3 ly) surrounding the star. This nebula could indicate that the star has a bow shock, which supplies evidence that the star does undergo episodic mass-loss, which makes it more likely that this is the case for almost all red supergiants.

The variability of the star and possible "great dimming" events are also consistent with episodic mass-loss, similar to those of Betelgeuse and RW Cephei. The rebrightening of B90, just like RW Cephei, took twice as long as that of Betelgeuse which could indicate a relation between the time taken and the radius of red supergiants, where B90 is 1,210 R_{☉}. (Note: Discrepancy in radius is caused by possible underestimation of the effective temperature measured using Titanium(II) oxide bands.)

=== Velocity ===
B90 has a very high velocity of (19 – 27) ± 11 km s^{−1} towards its nebular bar, making it a "walkaway" star. This may make the possibility that it has a bow shock more likely.

== See also ==
- VY Canis Majoris
- WOH G64
