= NGC 1712 =

Open cluster in the constellation Dorado

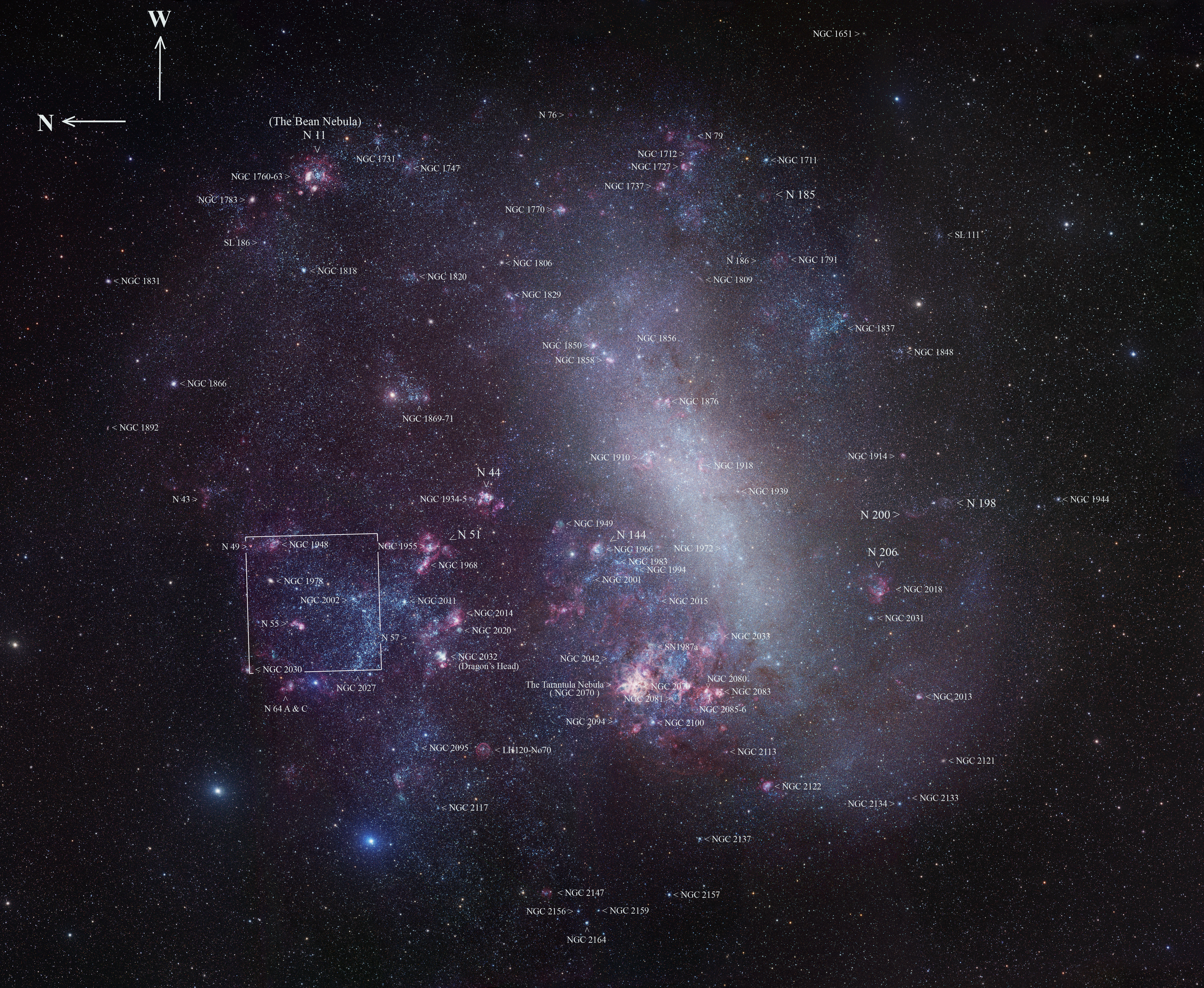
- Large Magellanic Cloud with NGC 1712 marked near the top (north is left)

Observation data (J2000 epoch)
- Right ascension: 04^{h} 50^{m} 58.0^{s}
- Declination: −69° 24′ 24″

Physical characteristics
- Other designations: GC 942, JH 2685, Dunlop 112

Associations
- Constellation: Dorado

NGC 1712, also known as GC 942, JH 2685, and Dunlop 112 is an open cluster in the constellation of Dorado. It is relatively small, and is located inside the Large Magellanic Cloud. NGC 1712 was originally discovered in 1826 by James Dunlop, although Herschel rediscovered it in 1834. Nine variable stars have been discovered in it so far, with three suspected to be binary systems.
