= Westerlund 1 =

Super star cluster in the Milky Way Galaxy

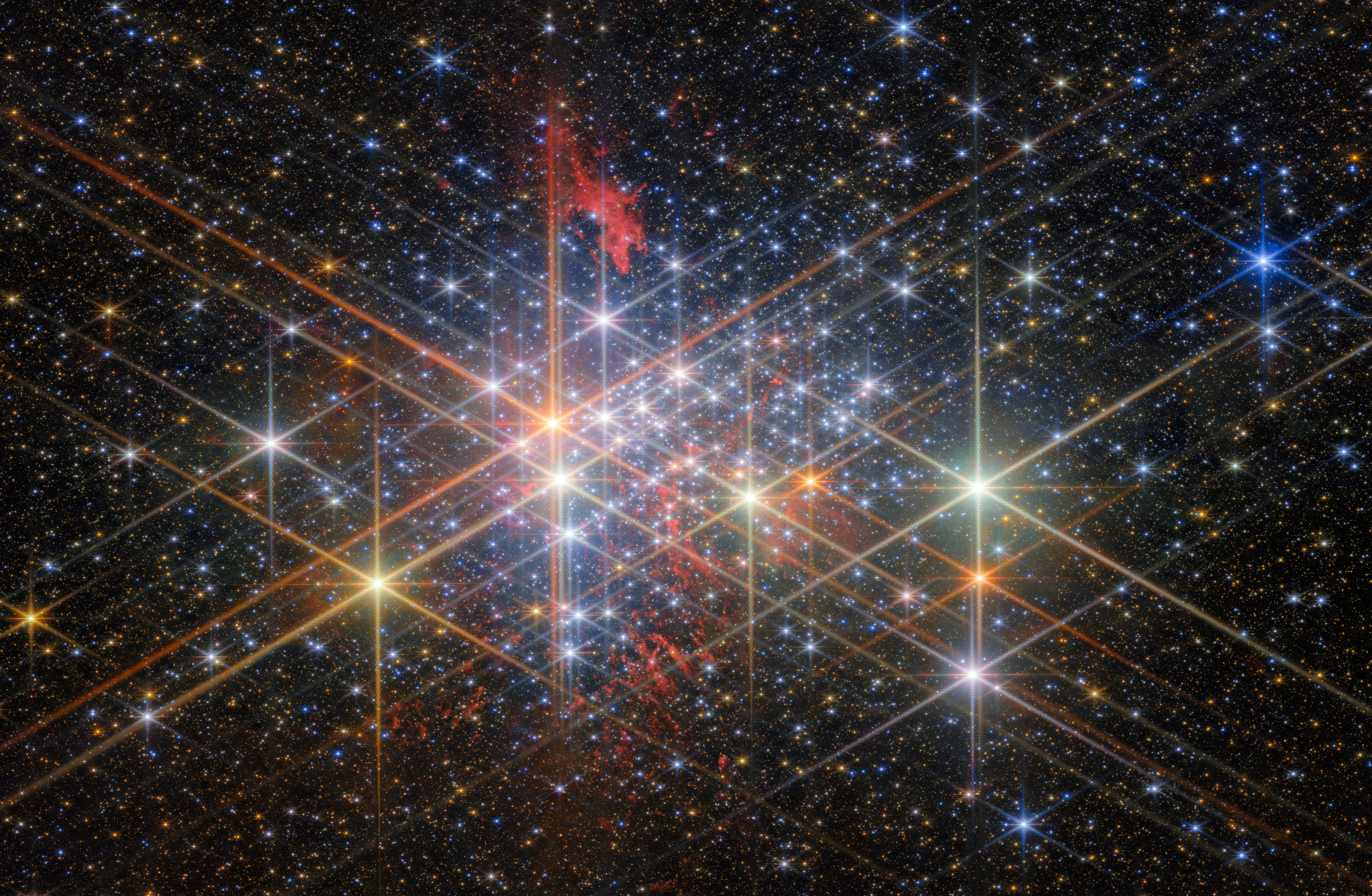
- James Webb Space Telescope infrared view of Westerlund1 (north is to the left)

Observation data (J2000 epoch)
- Right ascension: 16^{h} 47^{m} 04.0^{s}
- Declination: −45° 51′ 04.9″
- Distance: 3.78+0.56 −0.46 (2.6 – 4.23) kpc

Physical characteristics
- Mass: 63,000 M_{☉}
- Radius: 3.26 ly
- Estimated age: 3.50 Myr
- Other designations: Ara Cluster, Westerlund 1, ESO 277-12, C 1644-457, VDBH 197

Associations
- Constellation: Ara

Westerlund 1 (abbreviated Wd1, sometimes called Ara Cluster) is a compact young super star cluster about 3.8 kpc (12,000 ly) away from Earth. It is thought to be the most massive young star cluster in the Milky Way, and was discovered by Bengt Westerlund in 1961 but remained largely unstudied for many years due to high interstellar absorption in its direction. In the future, it will probably evolve into a globular cluster.

The cluster contains a large number of rare, evolved, high-mass stars, including: 6 yellow hypergiants, 4 red supergiants including Westerlund 1 W26, one of the largest known stars, 24 Wolf-Rayet stars, a luminous blue variable, many OB supergiants, and an unusual supergiant sgB[e] star which has been proposed to be the remnant of a recent stellar merger. In addition, X-ray observations have revealed the presence of the anomalous X-ray pulsar CXO J164710.20-455217, a slow rotating neutron star that must have formed from a high-mass progenitor star. Westerlund 1 is believed to have formed in a single burst of star formation, implying the constituent stars have similar ages and compositions.

Aside from hosting some of the largest and least-understood stars in our galaxy, Westerlund 1 is useful as a relatively nearby super star cluster that can aid astronomers determine what occurs within extragalactic super star clusters.

== Observations ==
Images of Westerlund 1: left is visible light, with all stars appearing red due to interstellar absorption; right is X-ray wavelengths, with the magnetar marked

The brightest O7–8V main sequence stars in Wd1 have V-band photometric magnitudes around 20.5, and therefore at visual wavelengths Wd1 is dominated by highly luminous post-Main Sequence stars (V-band magnitudes of 14.5–18, absolute magnitudes −7 to −10), along with less-luminous post-Main Sequence stars of luminosity class Ib and II (V-band magnitudes of 18–20). Due to the extremely high interstellar reddening towards Wd1, it is very difficult to observe in the U- and B-bands, and most observations are made in the R- or I-bands at the red end of the spectrum or in the infrared. Stars in the cluster are generally named using a classification introduced by Westerlund, although a separate naming convention is often used for the Wolf-Rayet stars.

At X-ray wavelengths, Wd1 shows diffuse emission from interstellar gas and point emission from both high-mass, post-Main Sequence and low mass, pre-Main Sequence stars. The Westerlund 1 magnetar is the most luminous X-ray point source in the cluster, with the sgB[e] star W9, the (presumed) binary W30a and the Wolf–Rayet stars WR A and WR B all strong X-ray sources. Approximately 50 other X-ray point sources are associated with luminous optical counterparts. Finally, at radio wavelengths the sgB[e] star W9 and red supergiants W20 and W26 are strong radio sources, while the majority of the cool hypergiants and a few OB supergiants and Wolf–Rayet stars are also detected.

== Age and evolutionary state ==
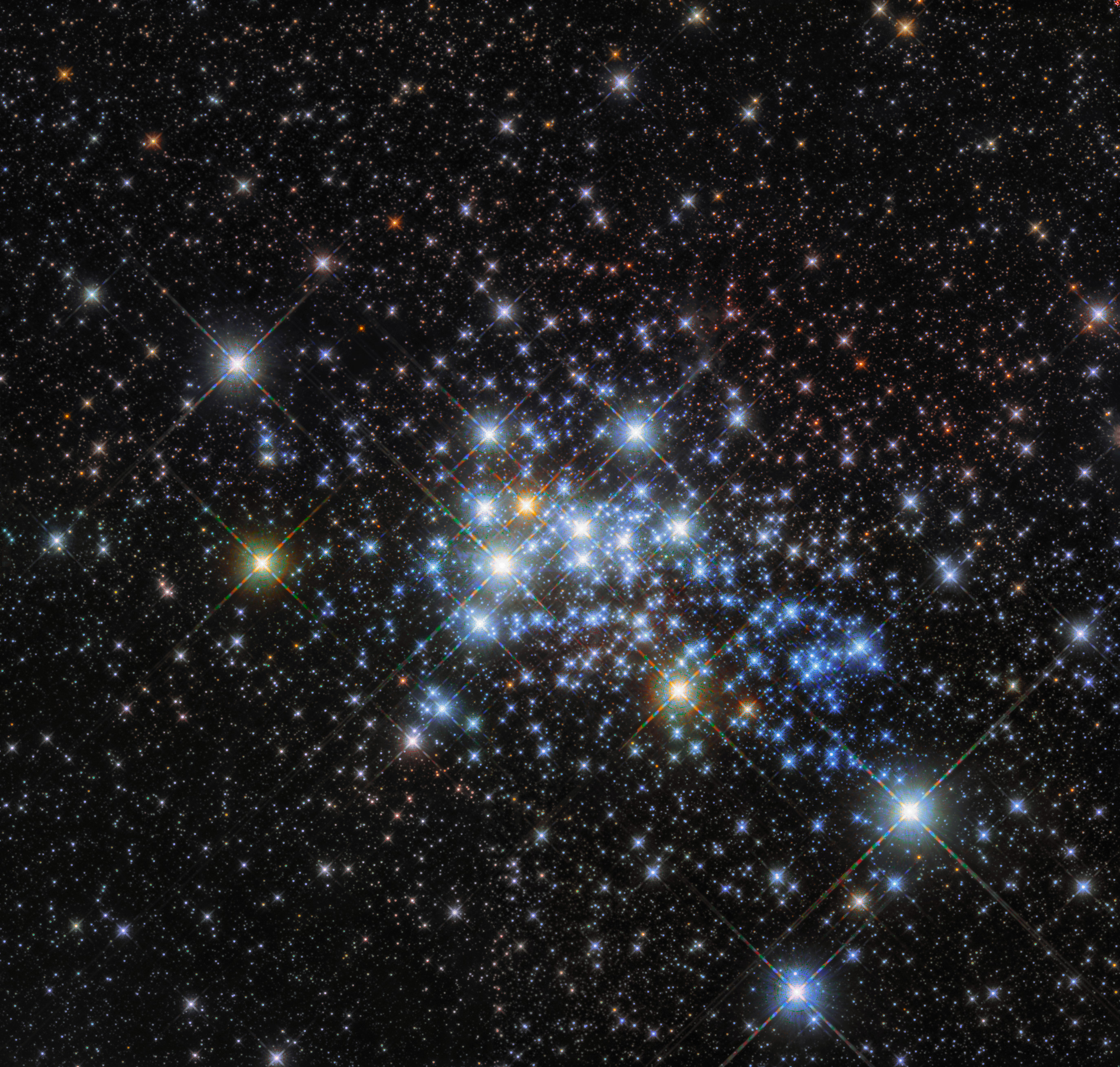
HST infrared image

The age of Wd1 is estimated at 4–5 Myr from comparison of the population of evolved stars with models of stellar evolution. The presence of significant numbers of both Wolf–Rayet stars and red and yellow supergiants in Wd1 represents a strong constraint on the age: theory suggests that red supergiants will not form until around 4 Myr as the most massive stars do not go through a red supergiant phase, while the Wolf–Rayet population declines sharply after 5 Myr. This range of ages is broadly consistent with infra-red observations of Wd1 that reveal the presence of late-O main sequence stars, although a lower age of around 3.5 Myr has been suggested from observations of lower-mass stars in Wd1.

Comet-like stars in Westerlund 1

If Wd1 formed stars with a typical initial mass function then the cluster would have originally contained a significant number of very massive stars, such as those currently observed in the younger Arches cluster. Current estimates of the age of Wd1 are greater than the lifetimes of these stars, and stellar evolution models suggest that there would already have been 50–150 supernovae in Wd1, with a supernova rate of approximately one per 10,000 years over the last million years. However, to date only one definitive supernova remnant has been detected—the Westerlund 1 magnetar—and the lack of other compact objects and high-mass X-ray binaries is puzzling. A number of suggestions have been put forward, including high supernova kick velocities that disrupt binary systems, the formation of slowly accreting (and therefore undetectable) stellar mass black holes, or binary systems in which both objects are now compact objects, but the problem has yet to be resolved.

As the stars in Westerlund 1 have the same age, composition and distance, the cluster represents an ideal environment for understanding the evolution of massive stars. The simultaneous presence of stars evolving on to and off of the Main Sequence presents a robust test for stellar evolution models, which are also currently unable to correctly predict the observed distribution of Wolf–Rayet subtypes in Westerlund 1.

== Binary fraction ==
A number of lines of evidence point to a high binary fraction amongst the high-mass stars in Wd1. Some massive binaries are detected directly through photometry and radial velocity observations, while many others are inferred through secondary characteristics (such as high X-ray luminosity, non-thermal radio spectra and excess infra-red emission) that are typical of colliding-wind binaries or dust-forming Wolf–Rayet stars. Overall binary fractions of 70% for the Wolf–Rayet population and in excess of 40% for the OB supergiants are currently estimated, although both may be incomplete.

== Members ==
As well as documented members of the cluster, the luminous blue variable MN44 is thought to be a runaway star ejected from Westerlund 1 four to five million years ago.

Designation	Right ascension	Declination	Object type	Spectral type	Luminosity (L_{☉})	Temperature (K)	Radius (R_{☉})
W2a	16^{h} 46^{m} 59.71^{s}	−45° 50′ 51.1″	Blue supergiant	O9.5 Ia – B0.5 Ia			
W4	16^{h} 47^{m} 01.42^{s}	−45° 50′ 37.1″	Yellow hypergiant	G0 Ia^{+} – F2 Ia^{+}			
W5	16^{h} 47^{m} 02.97^{s}	−45° 50′ 19.5″	Blue hypergiant				
W6a	16^{h} 47^{m} 04.04^{s}	−45° 50′ 21.0″	Blue supergiant				
W7	16^{h} 46^{m} 03.62^{s}	−45° 50′ 14.2″	Blue hypergiant				
W8a	16^{h} 47^{m} 04.79^{s}	−45° 50′ 24.9″	Yellow hypergiant				
W8b	16^{h} 47^{m} 04.95^{s}	−45° 50′ 26.7″	Blue hypergiant	B1-5Ia			
W9	16^{h} 47^{m} 04.14^{s}	−45° 50′ 31.1″	B[e] star	sgB[e]			
W12a	16^{h} 47^{m} 02.21^{s}	−45° 50′ 58.8″	Yellow hypergiant				
W13	16^{h} 47^{m} 06.45^{s}	−45° 50′ 26.0″	Eclipsing binary	B0.5 Ia^{+} + OB			
W16a	16^{h} 47^{m} 06.61^{s}	−45° 50′ 42.1″	Yellow hypergiant				
W20	16^{h} 47^{m} 04.70^{s}	−45° 51′ 23.8″	Red supergiant		126,000	3,500	965
W26	16^{h} 47^{m} 05.40^{s}	−45° 50′ 36.5″	Red supergiant	M2-6Ia	380,000 – 1,100,000	3,600 – 3,700	1,530−2,550, 1,165–1,221
W32	16^{h} 47^{m} 03.67^{s}	−45° 50′ 43.5″	Yellow hypergiant				
W33	16^{h} 47^{m} 04.12^{s}	−45° 50′ 48.3″	Blue hypergiant				
W36	16^{h} 47^{m} 05.08^{s}	−45° 50′ 55.1″	Eclipsing binary	O6.5III + O9.5 IV	275,000 + 89,000	12.69 + 10.46	
W75	16^{h} 47^{m} 08.93^{s}	−45° 49′ 58.4″	Red supergiant		68,000	3,600	668
W237	16^{h} 47^{m} 03.09^{s}	−45° 52′ 18.8″	Red supergiant		234,000	3,605	1,245
W243	16^{h} 47^{m} 07.55^{s}	−45° 52′ 28.5″	Luminous blue variable	LBV			
W265	16^{h} 47^{m} 06.26^{s}	−45° 49′ 23.7″	Yellow hypergiant				
WR 77a	16^{h} 46^{m} 55.4^{s}	−45° 51′ 34″	Wolf–Rayet star	WN6–7			
WR 77aa	16^{h} 46^{m} 46.3^{s}	−45° 47′ 58″	Wolf–Rayet star	WC9d			
WR 77b	16^{h} 46^{m} 59.9^{s}	−45° 55′ 26″	Wolf–Rayet star	WC8			
WR 77c	16^{h} 47^{m} 00.89^{s}	−45° 51′ 20.9″	Wolf–Rayet star	WNL			
WR 77d, W57c	16^{h} 47^{m} 01.5^{s}	−45° 51′ 45″	Wolf–Rayet star	WN8			
WR 77e	16^{h} 47^{m} 01.67^{s}	−45° 51′ 19.9″	Wolf–Rayet star	WN6–8			
WR 77f, W5	16^{h} 47^{m} 02.97^{s}	−45° 50′ 19.5″	Wolf–Rayet star	WNVL			
WR 77g	16^{h} 47^{m} 03.1^{s}	−45° 50′ 43″	Wolf–Rayet star	WC7			
WR 77h, W66	16^{h} 47^{m} 04.0^{s}	−45° 51′ 38″	Wolf–Rayet star	WC9			
WR 77i	16^{h} 47^{m} 04.02^{s}	−45° 51′ 25.2″	Wolf–Rayet star	WN6–8			
WR 77j, W44	16^{h} 47^{m} 04.20^{s}	−45° 51′ 07.0″	Wolf–Rayet star	WN9			
WR 77k	16^{h} 47^{m} 04.1^{s}	−45° 51′ 20″	Wolf–Rayet star	WC9			
WR 77l	16^{h} 47^{m} 04.40^{s}	−45° 51′ 03.8″	Wolf–Rayet star	WC8.5			
WR 77m, W239	16^{h} 47^{m} 05.21^{s}	−45° 52′ 25.0″	Wolf–Rayet star	WC9			
WR 77n	16^{h} 47^{m} 05.35^{s}	−45° 51′ 05.0″	Wolf–Rayet star	WN8 (uncertain)			
WR 77o, W14c	16^{h} 47^{m} 06.0^{s}	−45° 15′ 22″	Wolf–Rayet star	WN7o			
WR 77p, W241	16^{h} 47^{m} 06.06^{s}	−45° 52′ 08.3″	Wolf–Rayet star	WC9			
WR 77q	16^{h} 47^{m} 06.24^{s}	−45° 51′ 26.5″	Wolf–Rayet star	WN6–8			
WR 77r	16^{h} 47^{m} 07.6^{s}	−45° 52′ 36″	Wolf–Rayet star	WN6			
WR 77s, W72	16^{h} 47^{m} 08.32^{s}	−45° 50′ 45.5″	Wolf–Rayet star	WN6o			
WR 77sa	16^{h} 47^{m} 07.58^{s}	−45° 49′ 22.2″	Wolf–Rayet star	WN6h			
WR 77sb	16^{h} 47^{m} 07.66^{s}	−45° 52′ 35.9″	Wolf–Rayet star	WN6o			
WR 77sc, W72	16^{h} 47^{m} 08.32^{s}	−45° 50′ 45.5″	Wolf–Rayet star	WN7b			
WR 77sd	16^{h} 47^{m} 14.1^{s}	−45° 48′ 32″	Wolf–Rayet star	WN4–5			
CXOU J164710.2-455216	16^{h} 47^{m} 10.18^{s}	−45° 52′ 16.7″	anomalous X-ray pulsar				

== See also ==
- Westerlund 2
