= Super star cluster =

Type of very massive young open cluster thought to be the precursor of a globular cluster

A super star cluster (SSC) is a very massive young open cluster that is thought to be the precursor of a globular cluster. These clusters called "super" because they are relatively more luminous and contain more mass than other young star clusters. The SSC, however, does not have to physically be larger than other clusters of lower mass and luminosity. They typically contain a very large number of young, massive stars that ionize a surrounding HII region or a so-called "Ultra dense HII region (UDHII)" in the Milky Way Galaxy or in other galaxies (however, SSCs do not always have to be inside an HII region). An SSC's HII region is in turn surrounded by a cocoon of dust. In many cases, the stars and the HII regions will be invisible to observations in certain wavelengths of light, such as the visible spectrum, due to high levels of extinction. As a result, the youngest SSCs are best observed and photographed in radio and infrared. SSCs, such as Westerlund 1 (Wd1), have been found in the Milky Way Galaxy. However, most have been observed in farther regions of the universe. In the galaxy M82 alone, 197 young SSCs have been observed and identified using the Hubble Space Telescope.

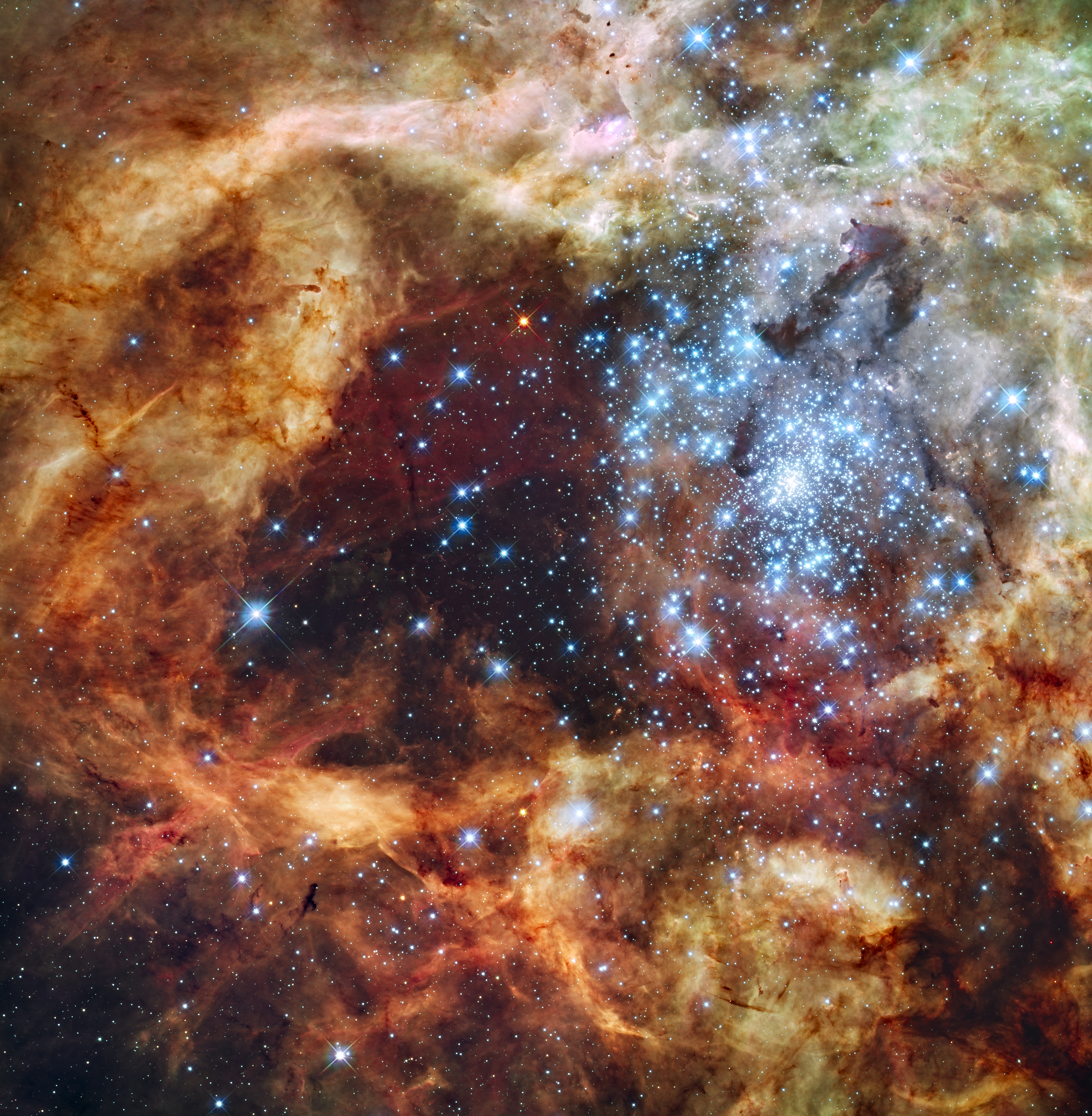
R136 is an example of a super star cluster

Generally, SSCs have been seen to form in the interactions between galaxies and in regions of high amounts of star formation with high enough pressures to satisfy the properties needed for the formation of a star cluster. These regions can include newer galaxies with much new star formation, dwarf starburst galaxies, arms of a spiral galaxy that have a high star formation rate, and in the merging of galaxies. In an Astronomical Journal published in 1996, using pictures taken in the ultraviolet (UV) spectrum by the Hubble Space Telescope of star-forming rings in five different barred galaxies, numerous star clusters were found in clumps within the rings which had high rates of star formation. These clusters were found to have masses of about 10^{3} M_{☉} to 10^{5} M_{☉}, ages of about 100 Myr, and radii of about 5 pc, and are thought to evolve into globular clusters later in their lifetimes. These properties match those found in SSCs.

== Characteristics and properties ==
The typical characteristics and properties of SSCs:

- Mass $\gtrsim$ 10^{5} M_{☉}
- Radius ≈ 5 pc ≈ 10^{19} cm
- Age ≈ 100 Myr (although other sources state that observed SSCs have an age of 1 Gyr)
- Large electron densities $n_\text{e}$ = 10^{3}–10^{6} cm^{−3} (this is a property of the HII region associated with the SSC)
- Pressures $P/$$k_\text{B}$ = 10^{7}–10^{10} K⋅cm^{−3}. (this is a property of the HII region associated with the SSC)

== Hubble Space Telescope contributions ==
Given the relatively small size of SSCs compared to their host galaxies, astronomers have had trouble finding them in the past due to the limited resolution of the ground-based and space telescopes at the time. With the introduction of the Hubble Space Telescope (HST) in the 1990s, finding SSCs (as well as other astronomical objects) became much easier thanks to the higher resolution of the HST (angular resolution of ~1/10 arcsecond). This has not only allowed astronomers to see SSCs, but also allowed for them to measure their properties as well as the properties of the individual stars within the SSC. Recently, a massive star, Westerlund 1-26, was discovered in the SSC Westerlund 1 in the Milky Way. The radius of this star is thought to be larger than the radius of Jupiter's orbit around the Sun. Essentially, the HST searches the night sky, specifically nearby galaxies, for star clusters and "dense stellar objects" to see if any have the properties similar to that of a SSC or an object that would, in its lifetime, evolve into a globular cluster.

== List of SSCs ==
Name	Contained in Galaxy	Comments	Refs / Notes	Pictures
Westerlund 1 (Wd1)	Milky Way Galaxy	First SSC discovered in the Milky Way Galaxy. This SSC was discovered by Bengt Westerlund in 1961.		Westerlund 1
NGC 3603	Milky Way Galaxy	Candidate for SSC		NGC 3603
RCW 38	Milky Way Galaxy	Youngest SSC in the galaxy		RCW 38
NGC 2070	Large Magellanic Cloud (LMC)	Candidate for SSC		NGC 2070
R136	Large Magellanic Cloud (LMC)	The prototype SSC, inside NGC 2070		R136 (Located in the Tarantula Nebula)
H72.97-69.39	Large Magellanic Cloud (LMC)	Also known as HSO BMHERICC J072.9711-69.3911, it was discovered in 2017 in the star-forming region LMC N79. It overlaps with NGC 1722. Further studied with ALMA and JWST.		NGC 1722 containing H72.97-69.39
NGC 346	Small Magellanic Cloud (SMC)	May be a SSC		NGC 346
NGC 1569 A1 and A2 (NGC 1569 A)	NGC 1569	Clusters A1 and A2 formed SSC A		NGC 1569
NGC 1569 B	NGC 1569	It contains older population of red giants and red supergiants		NGC 1569
NGC 5253's central SSC	NGC 5253	It is very dusty, and is the site of ongoing star formation. Particularly rich in O-type stars, containing at least 7,000.		NGC 5253
