= Cepheus OB1 =

OB Association in the constellation Cepheus

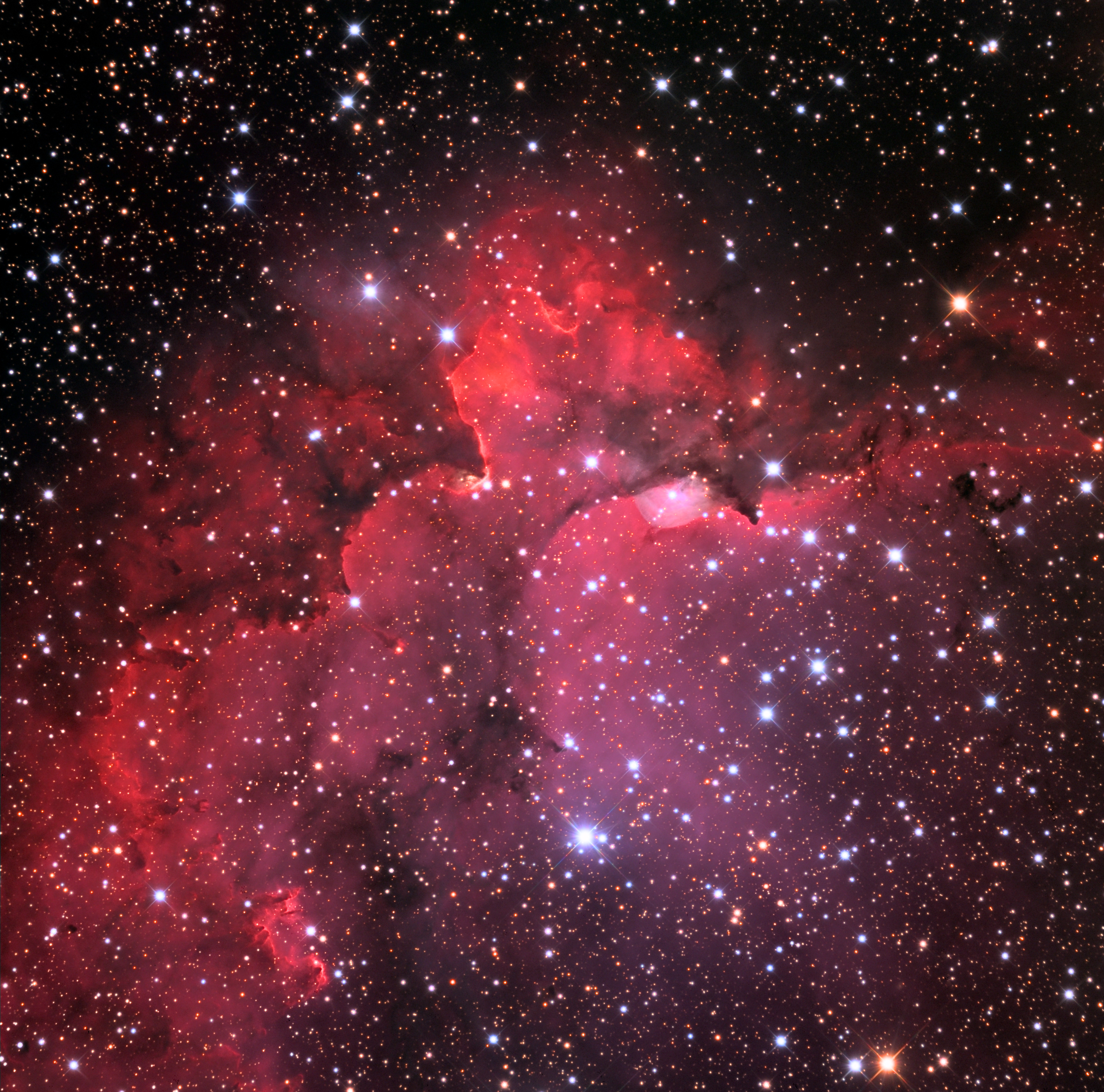
- NGC 7380 and Wizard nebula

Observation data (J2000.0 epoch)
- Right ascension: 22^{h} 29^{m} 00.0^{s}
- Declination: +56° 36′ 00″
- Distance: 3,400+220 −200 pc

Physical characteristics
- Radius: 815

Associations
- Constellation: Cepheus

Cepheus OB1 is an OB association around the cluster NGC 7380. The region is approximately 3,400 parsecs from Earth in the constellation of Cepheus, although many of its stars lie in neighboring constellations like Cassiopeia.

Cepheus OB1 contains dozens of O and B class stars, but the brightest members are cool supergiants and hypergiants such as V509 Cassiopeiae (HR 8752) and RW Cephei.

Prominent stars
Star	Spectral type	Notes
RW Cephei	K2 0-Ia	Variable, one of the largest stars known
V354 Cephei	M2.5 Iab / M3.5 Ib	Variable, one of the largest stars known
DH Cephei	O5.5 V / O6 V	Binary
HR 8752	G0 Ia-0	Yellow hypergiant
W Cephei	K0ep-M2ep Ia + B0/B1	Binary
U Lacertae	M4epIab + B	Spectroscopic binary, one of the largest stars known
WR 152	WN3(h)	Wolf–Rayet star
