= Emily Levesque =

American astrophysicist

- Born: 1984 (age 41–42); Taunton, Massachusetts, US
- Education: MIT; University of Hawaii
- Known for: Astrophysics
- Awards: Annie Jump Cannon Award in Astronomy; Sloan Fellowship; Guggenheim Fellowship; Fulbright Fellowship
- Scientific career
- Thesis: Exploring the Environments of Long-Duration Gamma-Ray Bursts (2010)
- Doctoral advisor: Lisa Kewley
- Website: www.emlevesque.com

Emily Levesque (born 1984) is an American astronomer, author, and associate professor in the Department of Astronomy at the University of Washington. She is known for her work on massive stars and using these stars to investigate galaxy formation. She is also the author of three books, including the 2020 popular science book The Last Stargazers: The Enduring Story of Astronomy's Vanishing Explorers.

== Early life and education ==
Levesque grew up in Taunton, Massachusetts. She received her undergraduate degree in physics at Massachusetts Institute of Technology in 2006, followed by a PhD in astronomy at the University of Hawaii in 2010.

== Academic career ==
From 2010 to 2015, Levesque was a postdoctoral researcher at University of Colorado as an Einstein Fellow from 2010 to 2013, and then received a Hubble Fellowship from 2013 to 2015. She has been an assistant professor in the Department of Astronomy at the University of Washington since 2015.

In 2015, Levesque, Rachel Bezanson, and Grant R. Tremblay wrote a preprint which critiqued the use of the Physics GRE as an admissions cutoff criterion for US astronomy postgraduate programs, by showing there was no statistical correlation between applicant's score and later success in their academic careers. Subsequently, the American Astronomical Society adopted the stance that the Physics GRE should not be mandatory for graduate school applications, and many graduate astronomy programs have since removed the Physics GRE as a required part of their graduate school applications.

In September 2026 Levesque was named as the incoming Editor in Chief of the American Astronomical Society journals, effective September 2027.

== Research ==
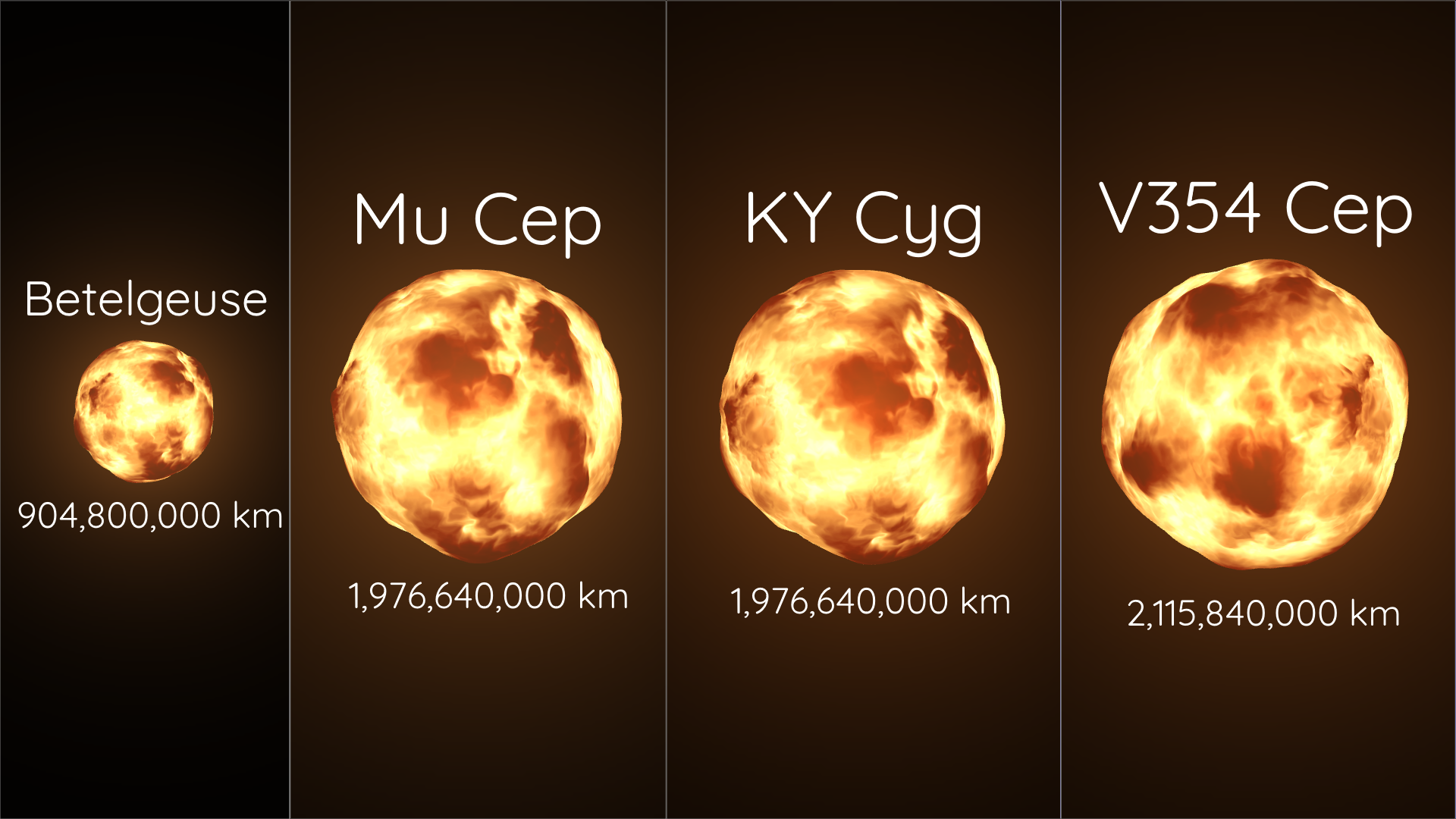
Size comparison of Betelgeuse, Mu Cephei, KY Cygni, and V354 Cephei according to Emily Levesque's publication

Levesque uses both observations and modeling in her work. In the ultraviolet portion of the spectrum, she uses the Hubble Space Telescope to obtain spectra of star-forming galaxies. In the optical, she uses the Gemini and Keck observatories on Mauna Kea and the Las Campanas Observatories in Chile to study red supergiants in the Milky Way and in the Magellanic Clouds. She has discovered many new red supergiants, as well as the first candidate for a Thorne-Zytkow object (HV 2112).

A 2017 conversation on Twitter between Levesque and fellow astrophysicist Jamie R. Lomax after an irruption of jumping spiders in Levesque's workplace led to informal experiments testing the animals' visual perception. Further information was provided by Nathan Morehouse, a researcher studying spider eyesight at the University of Cincinnati, who calculated that the spiders in question would be able to resolve the disc of the Moon. The cross-discipline interaction, which was said to constitute part of a suppositional field of 'arachno-astronomy', was lauded as a landmark moment on Science Twitter.

== Awards and recognition ==
In 2014, Levesque received the Annie Jump Cannon Award for her innovative work on gamma ray bursts. In 2017, she was awarded a Sloan Fellowship, awarded by the Alfred P. Sloan Foundation to early-career scholars.

Levesque was awarded a Guggenheim Fellowship in April 2022. From March to June of 2023, Levesque worked at the University of Auckland as a U.S. Fulbright scholar researching Thorne–Żytkow objects.

Levesque's book Understanding Stellar Evolution, co-written with Henny Lamers and based on a series of graduate lectures, was awarded the 2023 Chambliss Astronomical Writing Award by the American Astronomical Society.

== Bibliography ==
- Levesque, Emily (2020). The Last Stargazers: The Enduring Story of Astronomy's Vanishing Explorers. Naperville, Illinois: Sourcebooks. ISBN 978-1-4926-8107-6. OCLC 1125025889.
- Lamers, Henny J.G.L.M.; Levesque, Emily M. (2018). Understanding Stellar Evolution. IOP. ISBN 978-0-7503-1278-3.
- Levesque, Emily M. (2017). Astrophysics of Red Supergiants. IOP. ISBN 978-0-7503-1329-2.
