= KW Sagittarii =

Red supergiant star in the constellation Sagittarius

Observation data Epoch J2000 Equinox J2000
- Constellation: Sagittarius
- Right ascension: 17^{h} 52^{m} 00.72695^{s}
- Declination: −28° 01′ 20.5557″
- Apparent magnitude (V): 8.66 to 10.34

Characteristics
- Evolutionary stage: Red supergiant or hypergiant
- Spectral type: M1.5Iab (M0I - M4Ia)
- Apparent magnitude (K): 1.43
- U−B color index: 3.21
- B−V color index: 2.47
- V−R color index: 2.58
- J−K color index: 1.56
- Variable type: SRc

Astrometry
Radial velocity (R_{v})	−7.40 km/s
Proper motion (μ)	RA: +0.843 mas/yr Dec.: −0.946 mas/yr
Parallax (π)	0.4355±0.0726 mas
Distance	7,890 ly (2,420 pc) (Note: Assumed as KW Sagittarii is assumed to be part of Sgr OB5 association)
Absolute magnitude (M_{V})	−7.7

Details
Mass	20 (or 40 (Note: Assuming that KW Sagittarii doesn't rotate.)) M_{☉}
Radius	1,009±142 R_{☉}
Luminosity (bolometric)	175,000±52,000 L_{☉}
Surface gravity (log g)	0.0 cgs
Temperature	3,720±183 K

Other designations
- KW Sgr, AAVSO 1745-28, CD−27°12032, HD 316496, HIP 87433, Gaia DR2 4063462206570029312, Gaia DR3 4063462206570029312

Database references
SIMBAD	data

KW Sagittarii is a red supergiant or hypergiant star, located approximately 2,420 parsecs (7,900 light-years) away from the Sun in the direction of the constellation Sagittarius. It is one of the largest known stars, with a diameter about 1,000 times larger than the Sun. If placed at the center of the Solar System, the star's surface would engulf Mars, coming close to Jupiter's orbit.

== Variability ==
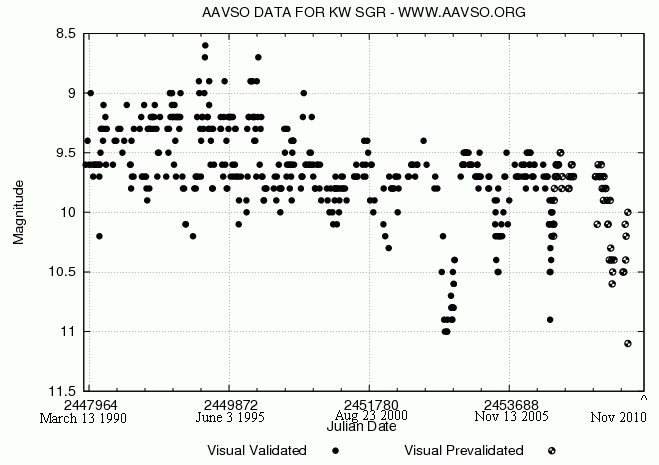
AAVSO light curve of KW Sgr from 1 January 1990 to 24 November 2010. Up is brighter and down is fainter. Day numbers are Julian day.

In 1942, Henrietta Hill Swope listed KW Sagittarii as a variable star. It varies erratically in brightness over a range of about two magnitudes. It is classified as a semiregular variable, although the listed period of 670 days is poorly defined. The peculiar cool spectrum has led to comparisons with symbiotic variables, but it is no longer considered to be a cataclysmic binary.

== Distance ==
A distance of 2,420 parsecs is based on the assumption of membership on the Sagittarius OB5 association. The parallax derived from the Hipparcos mission is negative so doesn't give much information about the distance except that it is likely to be large. The Gaia Data Release 2 parallax is 0.5281±0.1392 mas and implies a distance of around 1,900 pc. The Gaia result carries a significant statistical margin of error, as well as an indicator that the astrometric excess noise is far beyond acceptable levels so that the parallax should be considered unreliable. A 2021 study published a photogeometric distance of 2,159 pc to KW Sgr, using a parallax published by Gaia DR3 (the successor of Gaia DR2).

== Characteristics ==
KW Sagittarii is classed as a dust-enshrouded luminous cool supergiant and varies its spectral type between M0 and M4. Sometimes described as a cool hypergiant, it is losing its mass at 5.6×10^{−6} M_{☉} per year and is also found to be a confirmed maser source of SiO masers. H_{2}O and OH masers around the star have been proposed, but neither have been detected.

A 2005 study led by Levesque, using a MARCS model, calculated a high luminosity of 363,000 L_{☉} for KW Sgr and consequently very large radius of 1,460 R_{☉} based on the assumption of an effective temperature of 3,700 K at a distance of 3.0 kpc. The star was then described as among the four largest and most luminous galactic red supergiants known, which includes V354 Cephei, KY Cygni and Mu Cephei. In 2011, its bolometric luminosity was re-measured to be at around 228,000 L_{☉} based on the same distance.

More recently, the Sagittarius OB5 association was calculated to be somewhat closer than previously thought, which would suggest lower estimates for both the radius and luminosity of the star. Based on a distance of 2.4±0.3 kpc, its luminosity was calculated to be 175,000±52,000 L_{☉} with a radius of around 1,009±142 R_{☉} based on a measured angular diameter of 3.91±0.25 mas. Its angular diameter was re-measured at 3.00±0.4 mas in 2023. A 2024 measurement using photometry and the Gaia DR3 parallax puts KW Sagittarii at a radius value of 823 R_{☉}, together with a luminosity of 121,000 L_{☉}, assuming an effective temperature of 3,710 K from an adopted spectral class of M1.5.

== See also ==
- VX Sagittarii — another red supergiant (RSG) in the constellation Sagittarius
- UY Scuti
- AH Scorpii
