= 119 Tauri =

Star in the constellation Taurus

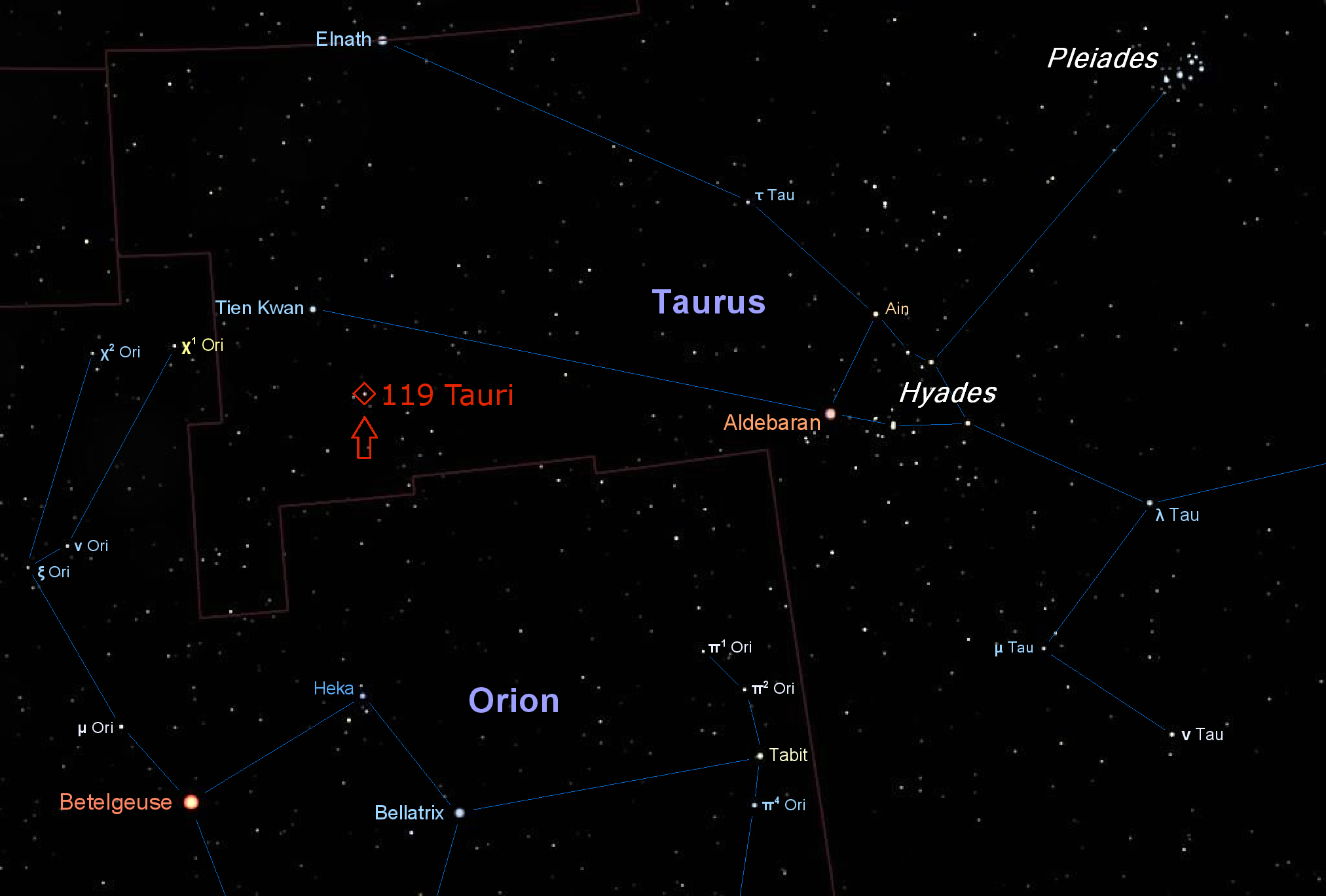
- The sky position of 119 Tauri

Observation data Epoch J2000.0 Equinox ICRS
- Constellation: Taurus
- Right ascension: 05^{h} 32^{m} 12.75251^{s}
- Declination: +18° 35′ 39.2436″
- Apparent magnitude (V): 4.23 - 4.54

Characteristics
- Evolutionary stage: Red supergiant
- Spectral type: M2Iab-Ib
- U−B color index: +2.23
- B−V color index: +2.08
- Variable type: SRc

Astrometry
Radial velocity (R_{v})	+23.75 km/s
Proper motion (μ)	RA: 1.86 mas/yr Dec.: −4.48 mas/yr
Parallax (π)	1.82±0.26 mas
Distance	approx. 1,800 ly (approx. 550 pc)
Absolute magnitude (M_{V})	−5.20

Details
Mass	14.37+2.00 −2.77 M_{☉}
Radius	587 - 593 R_{☉}
Luminosity	66,000 L_{☉}
Surface gravity (log g)	+0.05+0.11 −0.17 cgs
Temperature	3,801 - 3,820 K
Metallicity	0.0
Age	13.9+1.0 −2.5 Myr

Other designations
- Ruby Star, 119 Tau, CE Tau, AAVSO 0526+18, BD+18°875, GC 6841, HD 36389, HIP 25945, HR 1845, SAO 94628

Database references
SIMBAD	data

119 Tauri (also known as CE Tauri) is a red supergiant star in the constellation Taurus. It is a magnitude 4 star, visible to the naked eye under good observing conditions. A semiregular variable, its angular diameter has been measured at about 10 mas. It is a similar star to Betelgeuse although redder and more distant.

== Nomenclature ==
119 Tauri is the star's Flamsteed designation, and CE Tauri is its variable star designation. It is sometimes referred to by the nickname "Ruby Star" in reference to its red color, coined by astronomer A. Ahad in the 2000s. Other red stars have also been described as "ruby stars".

== Description ==
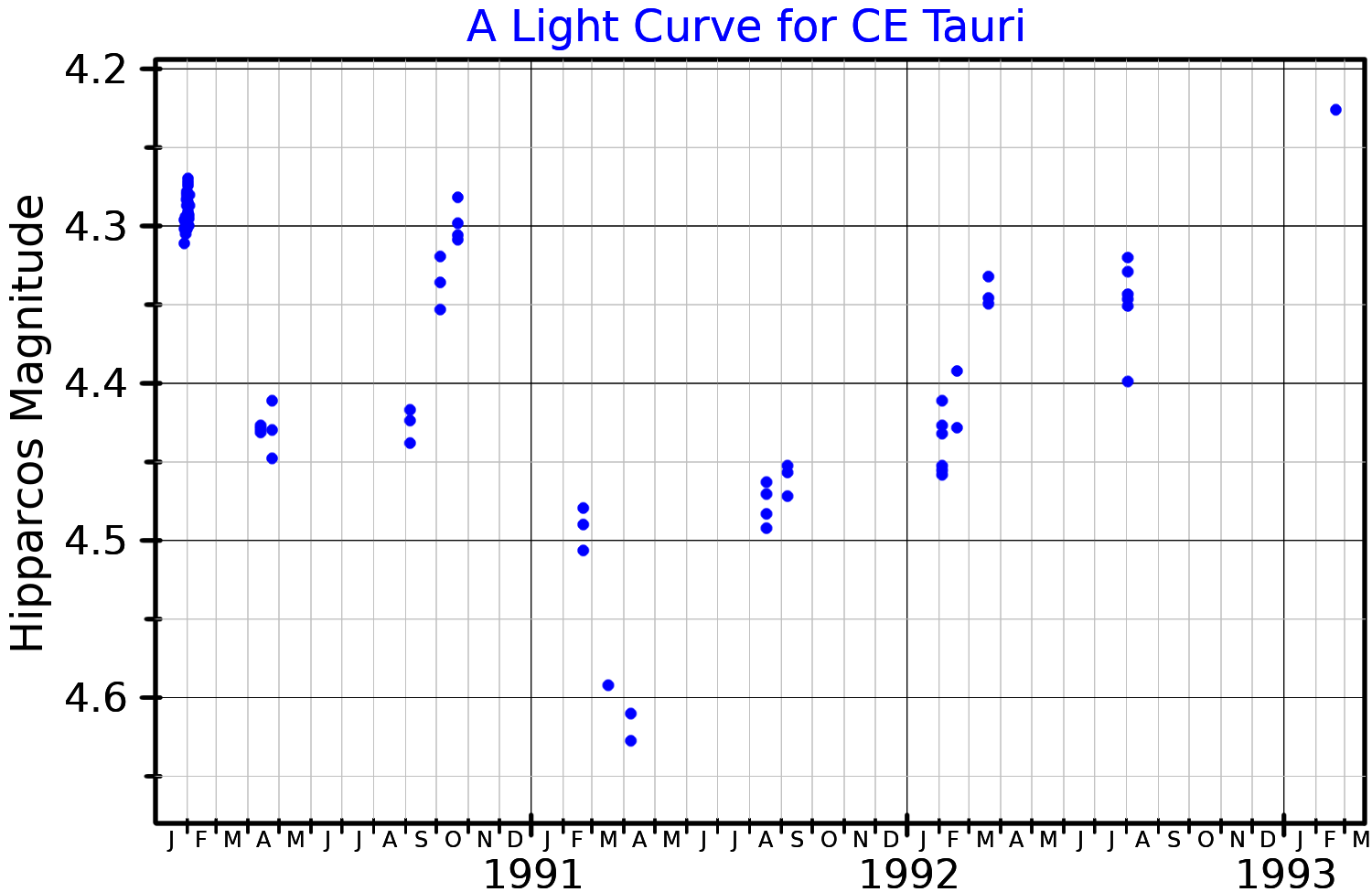
A light curve for CE Tauri, plotted from Hipparcos data

119 Tauri has a spectral class of M2 and a luminosity class of Iab-Ib, intermediate between an intermediate-luminosity supergiant and a less luminous supergiant. It is approximately 1,800 light years from Earth, and with a colour index of +2.07 it is one of the reddest naked-eye stars in the night sky, second only to Mu Cephei (the Garnet Star).

119 Tauri is classified as a semiregular variable star and has been given the variable star designation CE Tauri. The General Catalogue of Variable Stars gives a magnitude range from +4.23 to +4.54 with a period of 165 days. Other published studies find poorly defined periodicity, but with possible periods around 270 and 1,300 days. Its infrared magnitude changes much less than the visual magnitude; the visual brightness changes are driven by changes in temperature which shift the proportion of electromagnetic radiation emitted in the visual range.

The head of the bull in the constellation Taurus in the upper right corner with the open star cluster of the Hyades and the bright star Aldebaran (α Tauri, 0,8^{m}). On the left the two tips of the bull's horns Elnath (β Tauri, 1,6^{m}, at the top, north of the ecliptic) and Tien Kuan (ζ Tauri, 2,9^{m}, at the bottom, south of the ecliptic). A little bit below and right the Red Giant 119 Tauri (4,3^{m}).

== Occultations ==
CE Tauri lies 4.6 degrees off the ecliptic. This makes it a candidate for occultations by the Moon and (extremely rarely) by one of the bright planets. The star's angular diameter has been measured by lunar occultation, giving limb-darkened visible light angular diameters of 9.1±0.8 mas, 10.9±1.0 mas, and 9.0±0.2 mas. An occultation has also been observed in H-alpha, giving a diameter of 17±1 mas, which indicates that there is circumstellar hydrogen producing emission across at least that size, nearly twice the visible diameter.

== Angular diameter ==
The angular diameter of 119 Tauri has also been measured directly by VLBI, leading to limb-darkened diameters of 10.68±0.21 mas, 9.83±0.07 mas, 9.3±0.5 mas, 9.97±0.08 mas, 10.24±0.05 mas, 9.68±0.05 mas. Although CE Tauri is classified as a pulsating variable, observations using the same equipment and wavelengths have not detected significant changes in the angular diameter over time. Reconstructed images of the surface show bright spots that are attributed to giant convection cells.

== Properties ==
Angular diameter measurements can be combined with absolute observed fluxes to derive an accurate effective temperature, about 3,800 K for 119 Tauri. Combined with a distance, the linear size of the star can be calculated. CE Tauri is found to have a radius between 587 and 593 R_{☉}. Then the bolometric luminosity is the star is found to be about 66,000 L_{☉}. However, the distance to 119 Tauri is still only known approximately from its Hipparcos parallax. Gaia Data Release 2 gives a distinctly larger parallax, but with even greater uncertainty and flagged as unreliable.

119 Tauri is a pulsating star although the pulsation has not been clearly detected in direct angular measurements. Observations of TiO lines in its spectrum as its brightness changes show effective temperature changes up to 100 K. Calculating its physical properties shows that the bolometric luminosity and radius both change by about 10%, with the radius typically being larger at cooler temperatures.

Comparison of its properties with stellar evolutionary tracks shows CE Tauri to have evolved from an initial mass of 15 M_{☉} and to have a current mass of 14.37 M_{☉}. An alternative interpretation of observations, under the assumption that CE Tauri is an asymptotic giant branch (AGB) star, give it a current mass of 8 M_{☉} and a luminosity of 44,000 L_{☉}.
