= U Lacertae =

Binary star in the constellation Lacerta

- Location of U Lacertae (circled)

Observation data Epoch J2000 Equinox ICRS
- Constellation: Lacerta
- Right ascension: 22^{h} 47^{m} 43.42677^{s}
- Declination: +55° 09′ 30.3036″
- Apparent magnitude (V): 9.4 to 12.1

Characteristics
- Spectral type: M4epIab + B
- U−B color index: +1.46
- B−V color index: +2.34
- Variable type: SRc

Astrometry
Radial velocity (R_{v})	−68 km/s
Proper motion (μ)	RA: −3.207 mas/yr Dec.: −3.150 mas/yr
Parallax (π)	0.3519±0.0708 mas
Distance	2,750 pc
Absolute magnitude (M_{V})	−5.6

Details
Mass	22 M_{☉}
Radius	1,013 R_{☉}
Luminosity	152,000 L_{☉}
Temperature	3,535 K

Other designations
- U Lac, HIP 112545, PPM 411, GSC 03988-01641, IRC+50446, TYC 3988-1641-1, BD+54°2863, HD 215924, 2MASS J22474341+5509303, AAVSO 2243+54

Database references
SIMBAD	data

U Lacertae is a spectroscopic binary star in the constellation Lacerta.

Despite being in the constellation of Lacerta, U Lacertae is considered to be a member of the Cepheus OB1 association. It has been listed as a member of the open cluster ASCC 123.

U Lacertae is a binary star consisting of a red supergiant and a small hot companion, similar to VV Cephei. The companion has been identified from a high excitation component in the spectrum and from radial velocity variations, but the orbit is unknown.

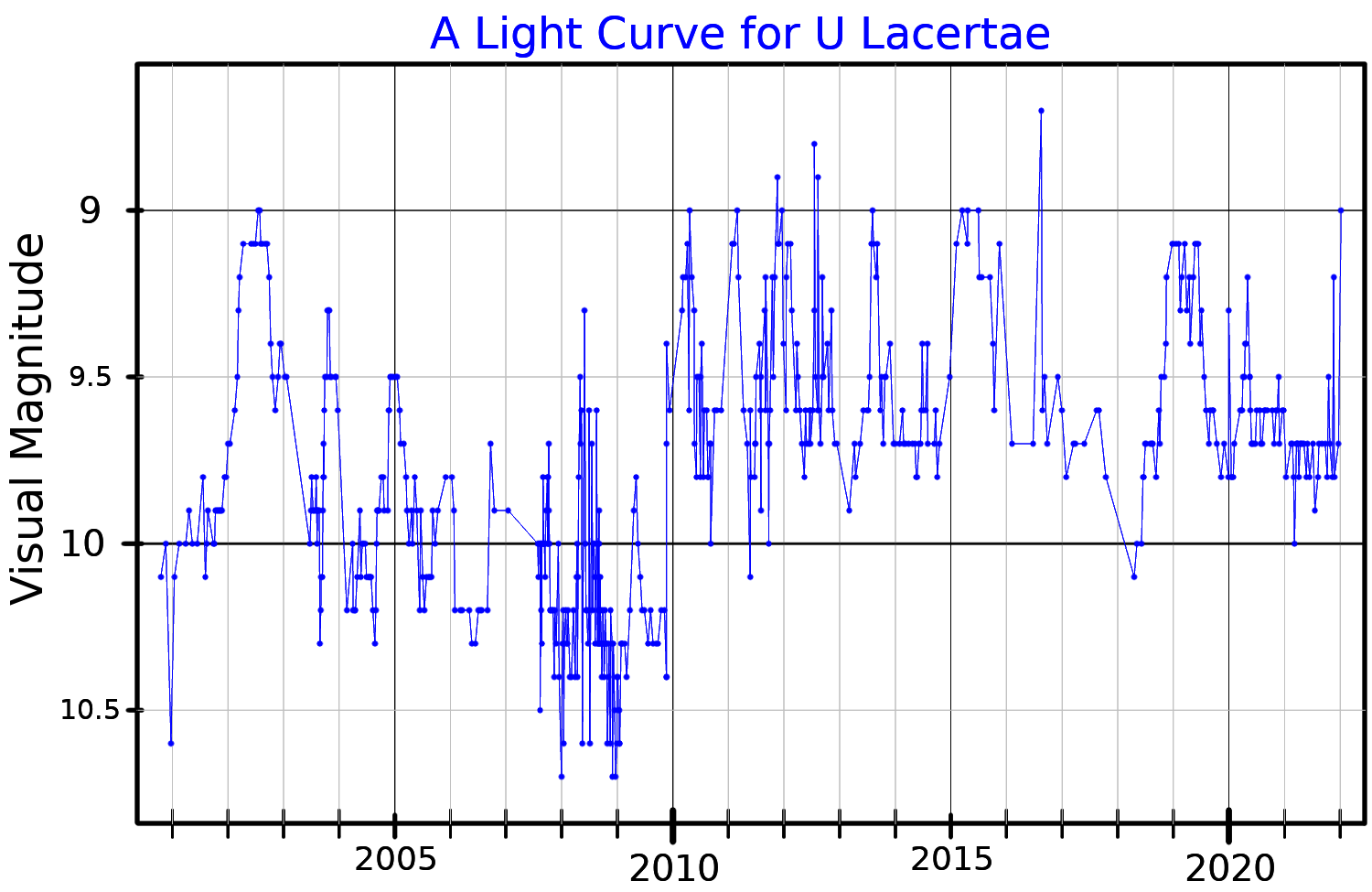
A visual band light curve for U Lacertae, plotted from AAVSO data

In 1894, T. H. E. C. Espin announced that the star, then called BD +54° 2863, might be a variable star. T. W. Blackhouse confirmed its variability in 1897. It was listed with its variable star designation, U Lacertae, in Annie Jump Cannon's 1907 work Second Catalog of Variable Stars. U Lacertae is classified as a semiregular variable. The periodicity is uncertain but a main period of 150 days and a long secondary period of 550 – 690 days have been suggested. A study of Hipparcos satellite photometry found an amplitude of 0.77 magnitudes and found no periodicity. The General Catalogue of Variable Stars lists an amplitude of 2.7 magnitudes.

Water masers have been detected around U Lacertae, common in the extended atmospheres of very luminous cool stars.

== See also ==
- List of largest stars
