= AH Scorpii =

Red supergiant star in the constellation Scorpius

- AH Scorpii as viewed by 2MASS.

Observation data Epoch J2000 Equinox ICRS
- Constellation: Scorpius
- Right ascension: 17^{h} 11^{m} 17.01945^{s}
- Declination: −32° 19′ 30.7140″
- Apparent magnitude (V): 6.5 - 9.6

Characteristics
- Evolutionary stage: OH/IR RSG / RHG
- Spectral type: M4-5 Ia-Iab
- B−V color index: +2.57
- Variable type: SRc

Astrometry
Radial velocity (R_{v})	−13.40±2.4 km/s
Proper motion (μ)	RA: −2.322±0.115 mas/yr Dec.: −2.610±0.068 mas/yr
Parallax (π)	0.5632±0.0799 mas
Distance	7,400±620 ly (2,260±190 pc)
Absolute magnitude (M_{V})	−5.8

Details
Mass	20 M_{☉}
Radius	1,411±124 R_{☉}
Luminosity	329,000±86,000 L_{☉}
Surface gravity (log g)	–0.5 cgs
Temperature	3,682±190 K

Other designations
- AN 223.1907, IRC−30282, RAFGL 1927, AH Sco, AAVSO 1704-32, CD32°12429, HD 155161, HIP 84071, GSC 07365-00527, IRAS 17080-3215, 2MASS J17111702-3219308

Database references
SIMBAD	data

AH Scorpii (abbreviated to AH Sco) is a red supergiant or hypergiant variable star located in the constellation Scorpius. It is one of the largest stars known by radius and is also one of the most luminous red supergiant stars in the Milky Way.

== Observational history ==
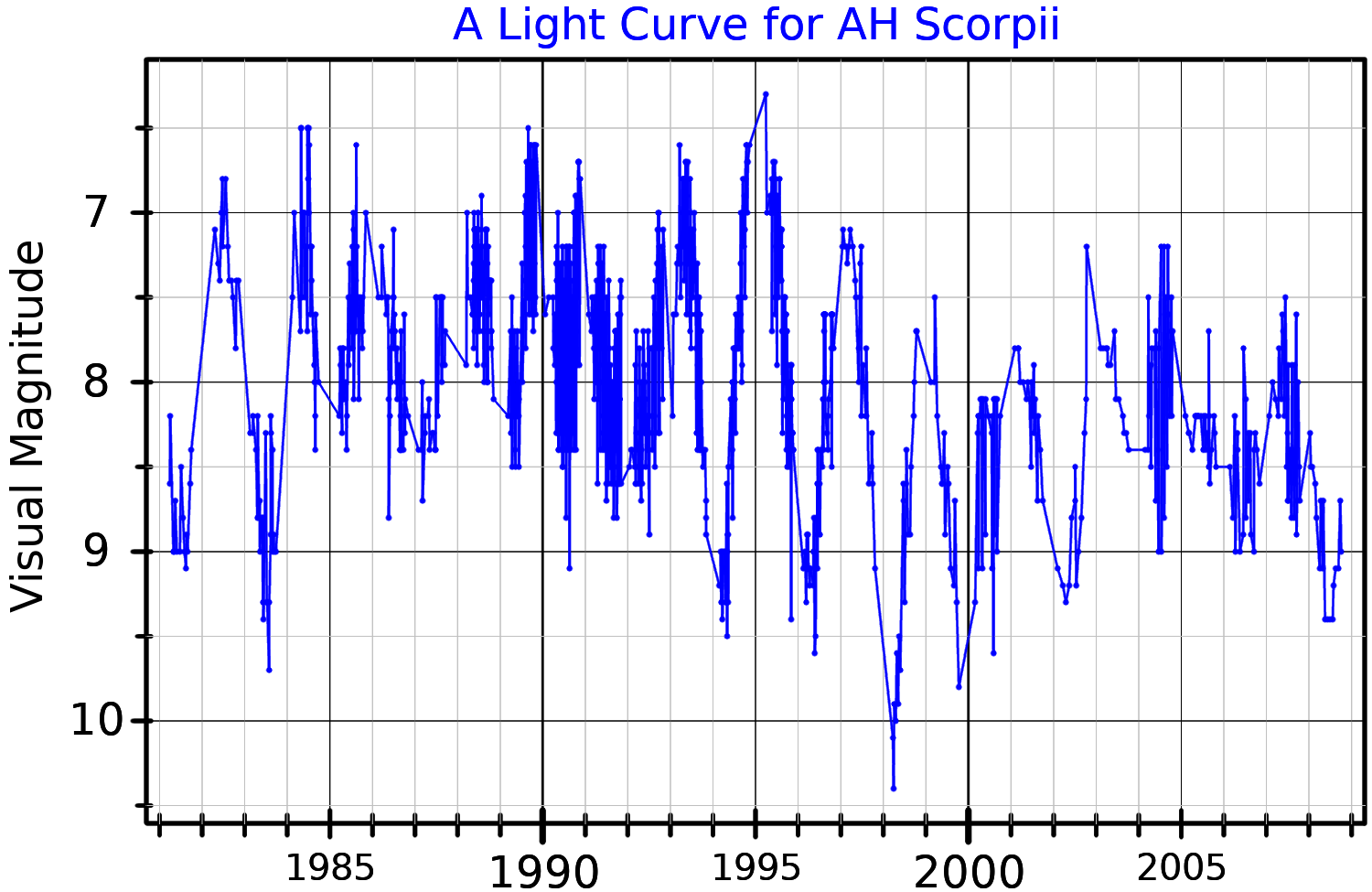
A visual band light curve for AH Scorpii, plotted from AAVSO data

In 1907, Henrietta Swan Leavitt and Edward Charles Pickering announced the discovery of this variable star. It was given its variable star designation, AH Scorpii, in 1912. The total visual magnitude range is 6.5 - 9.6.

== Distance ==
Prior to the 21st century, the distance of AH Scorpii was considered to be uncertain, between about 1.5 and 4.6 kiloparsecs (kpc). VLBI measurements of the masers have provided an accurate distance of 2.26±0.19 kpc based on observation of SiO, H_{2}O, and OH masers in its oxygen-rich circumstellar material. The masers were observed to be approaching the star at 13 km/s, indicating overall contraction at around phase 0.55 of the visual variations. Gaia Data Release 3 includes a parallax of 0.5632±0.0799 mas, corresponding to a distance of about 1.9 kpc.

== Characteristics ==
The star is a dust-enshrouded red supergiant and is classified as a semiregular variable star with a main period of 714 days. No long secondary periods have been detected.

Modelling of AH Scorpii near maximum light has determined an effective temperature of 3,682±190 K and a luminosity of 330,000±86,000 L_{☉}. A radius of 1,411±124 R_{☉} was determined from an angular diameter of 5.81±0.15 mas and the given distance of 2.26±0.19 kpc. Its angular diameter was re-measured at 5.05±0.5 mas in 2023.

== See also ==
- VY Canis Majoris
- NML Cygni
- KW Sagittarii
- UY Scuti
