= W Cephei =

Variable star in the constellation Cepheus

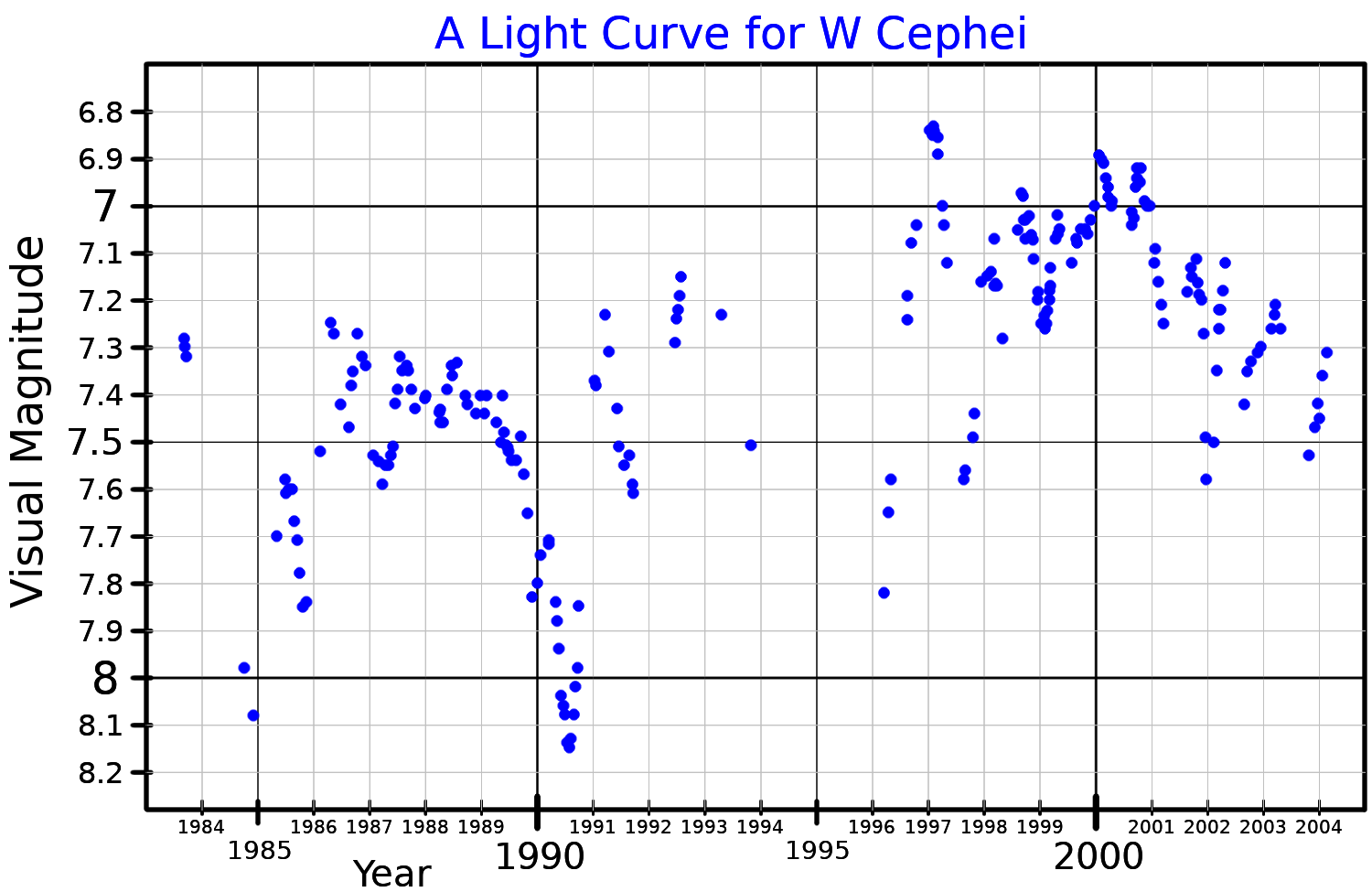
- A visual band light curve for W Cephei, adapted from Polyakova (2006)

Observation data Epoch J2000 Equinox ICRS
- Constellation: Cepheus
- Right ascension: 22^{h} 36^{m} 27.56307^{s}
- Declination: +58° 25′ 33.9554″
- Apparent magnitude (V): 6.83 - 9.20

Characteristics
- Evolutionary stage: Red supergiant + non-supergiant B class star
- Spectral type: K0ep-M2ep Ia + B0/B1
- Variable type: SRc

Astrometry
Radial velocity (R_{v})	−44.64 km/s
Proper motion (μ)	RA: −3.176 mas/yr Dec.: −2.277 mas/yr
Distance	2,427 pc
Absolute magnitude (M_{V})	−7 + −3.5

Orbit
Period (P)	2,075 d
Eccentricity (e)	0.149
Inclination (i)	90°

Details
Radius	670+20 −10 R_{☉}
Luminosity	292,000 L_{☉}
Surface gravity (log g)	0.18 cgs
Temperature	3,681 – 4,400 K
Metallicity	0.0205

Other designations
- W Cep, BD+57°2568, HD 214369, HIP 111592, GSC 03995-00937, SAO 34614, PPM 40864, GC 31569, UCAC3 297-183471, IRAS 22345+5809, 2MASS J22362757+5825340, AAVSO 2232+57

Database references
SIMBAD	data

W Cephei is a spectroscopic binary and variable star located in the constellation Cepheus. It is thought to be a member of the Cep OB1 stellar association at about 8,000 light years.

== Discovery ==
W Cephei was catalogued as BD+57°2568 in the Bonner Durchmusterung published in 1903, and HD 214369 in the Henry Draper Catalogue. It was discovered to be a variable star by T. H. E. C. Espin, in 1885. It was described in 1896 as a red star varying from magnitude 7.3 to 8.3.

In 1925, W Cep was included in a listing of Be stars. It was recognised as a cool star with spectral type Mep. It was classified as K0ep Ia from a 1949 spectrum, but also recognised to have a small hot companion, plus an unusual infrared excess. Ultraviolet spectra allowed absorption lines from the companion to be studied and it was given a spectral type of B0-1.

== System ==
The W Cephei system contains a luminous red supergiant star with a non-supergiant early B companion. The star has unusual emission lines including both permitted and forbidden Fe_{II}, produced by a circumstellar envelope containing dust and ionised gas. The two components have been resolved at 0.262″ using speckle interferometry. An orbital period of 2,090 days has been proposed.

== Variability ==
W Cephei varies in brightness from 7th to 9th magnitude. The General Catalogue of Variable Stars lists it as a semiregular variable with a period of 370 days, but later attempts to find a period have shown only random variations. It has also been proposed that eclipses occur.
