= V354 Cephei =

Star in the constellation Cepheus

Observation data Epoch J2000.0 Equinox J2000.0 (ICRS)
- Constellation: Cepheus
- Right ascension: 22^{h} 33^{m} 34.636^{s}
- Declination: +58° 53′ 47.12″
- Apparent magnitude (V): 10.82 to 11.35

Characteristics
- Spectral type: M2.5 Iab – M3.5 Ib
- B−V color index: +3.18
- Variable type: Lc

Astrometry
Proper motion (μ)	RA: −3.151 mas/yr Dec.: −2.398 mas/yr
Parallax (π)	0.2161±0.0388 mas
Distance	12,700+2,200 −1,700 ly (3,900+680 −510 pc)
Absolute magnitude (M_{V})	–7.57±0.3 (variable)
Absolute bolometric magnitude (M_{bol})	-8.51

Details
Mass	26±2 (Note: Calculated using the star's absolute bolometric magnitude of -9.17±0.3 in the following equation: log(M) = 0.50−0.1 • M_{bol}. This results in a mass logarithm of 1.417±0.03, and 10^{1.417}^{±0.03} is equal to 26.1+1.9 −1.7 M_{☉}.) M_{☉}
Radius	1,245 R_{☉}
Luminosity	250,000 L_{☉}
Surface gravity (log g)	–0.5 cgs
Temperature	3,650±100 K

Other designations
- V354 Cep, IRAS 22317+5838, 2MASS J22333464+5853470

Database references
SIMBAD	data

V354 Cephei (abbreviated to V354 Cep) is a red supergiant star located within the northern constellation of Cepheus. It is an irregular variable located over 13,000 light-years away from the Sun, and is considered to be one of the largest known stars and one of most luminous of its type, with an estimated radius of 1,250 solar radii (870,000,000 km; 5.8 au). If it were placed in the center of the Solar System, it would extend beyond the orbit of Jupiter.

== Identification ==
V354 Cephei is identified as a red supergiant variable star and included on surveys such as IRAS and 2MASS, but prior to its inclusion in the General Catalogue of Variable Stars in 1981, it was referred to only by its listings on relatively obscure catalogs. It is too faint to be included in catalogs such as the Henry Draper Catalogue or Bonner Durchmusterung. It was included on a 1947 Dearborn Observatory survey as star 41575, but that ID is hardly ever used.

V354 Cephei has been referred to as Case 75. This is from one of several listings of cool stars made using the Burrell Schmidt telescope at the Warner and Swasey Observatory of Case Western Reserve University, although Case 75 is mistakenly identified as the nearby F3V star BD+58°2450. The carbon star AT Persei is listed as star 75 in another of the survey papers and is also known as Case 75. The SIMBAD astronomical portal prefers to restrict that usage to AT Persei and has devised a different unique acronym for V354 Cephei.

== Distance ==
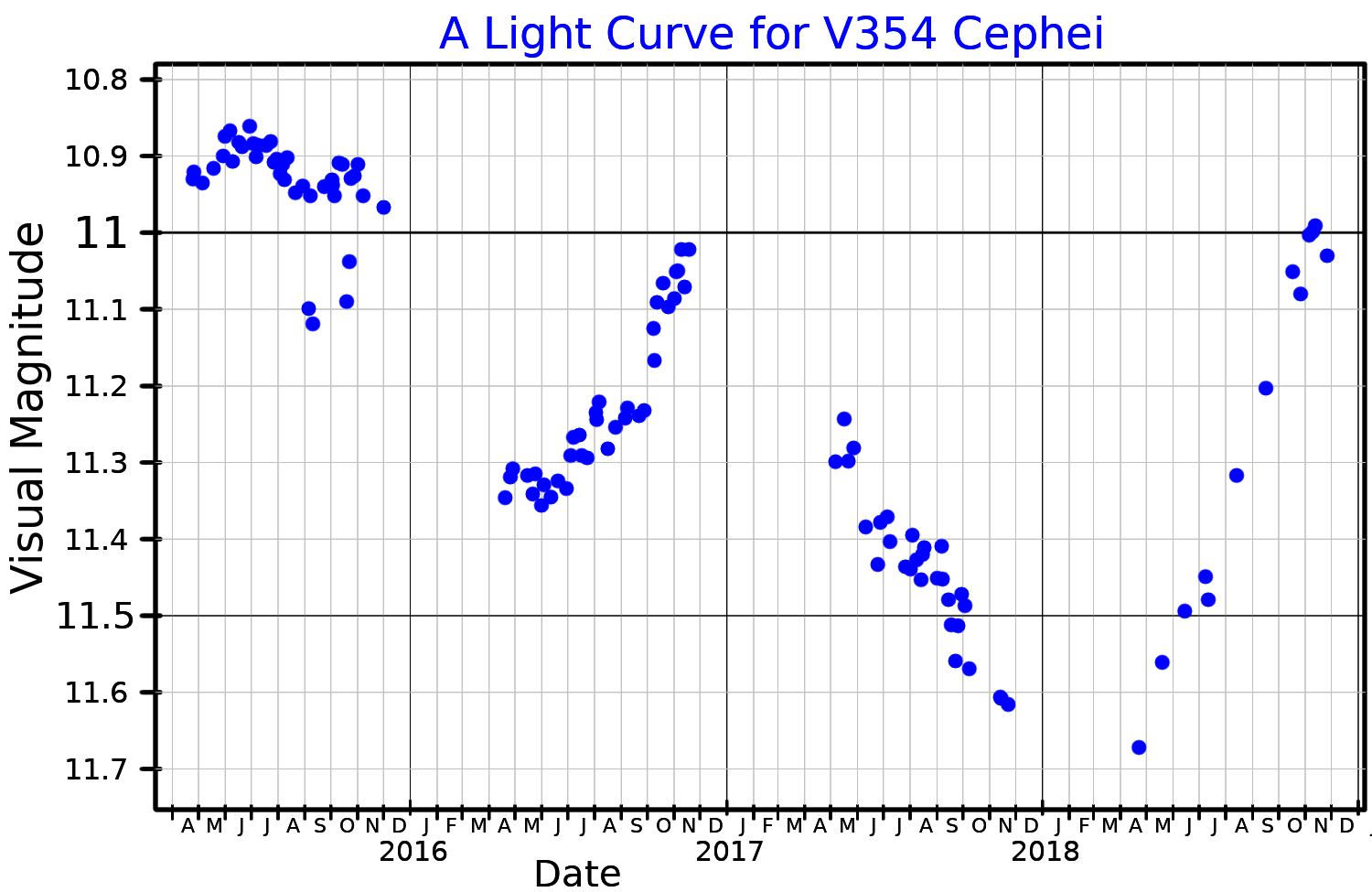
A visual band light curve for V354 Cephei, plotted from ASAS data

V354 Cephei is near the Cepheus OB1 stellar association and considered a likely member, although the star lies outside its suggested boundaries, making its membership potentially questionable. This association is at a distance of between 2,750 and 3,500 parsecs, (Note: V354 Cephei is assumed to be part of the Cep OB1 association, which has an adopted distance modulus of 12.2. See Tables 1 and 2, Levesque et al. 2005.) but currently thought to be at 3,400 parsecs based on reliable Gaia Data Release 2 parallaxes of neighbouring OB stars. Its Gaia Data Release 2 parallax is 0.4581±0.1023 mas, implying a much smaller distance of around 2,000 pc. The Gaia Early Data Release 3 parallax is 0.2161±0.0388 mas, implying a larger distance. Although the latter is consistent with a few distance estimates for Cepheus OB1, both Gaia results carry significant statistical margin of error, as well as indicators that the astrometric excess noise is far beyond acceptable levels, so that the parallax should be considered unreliable.

== Properties ==
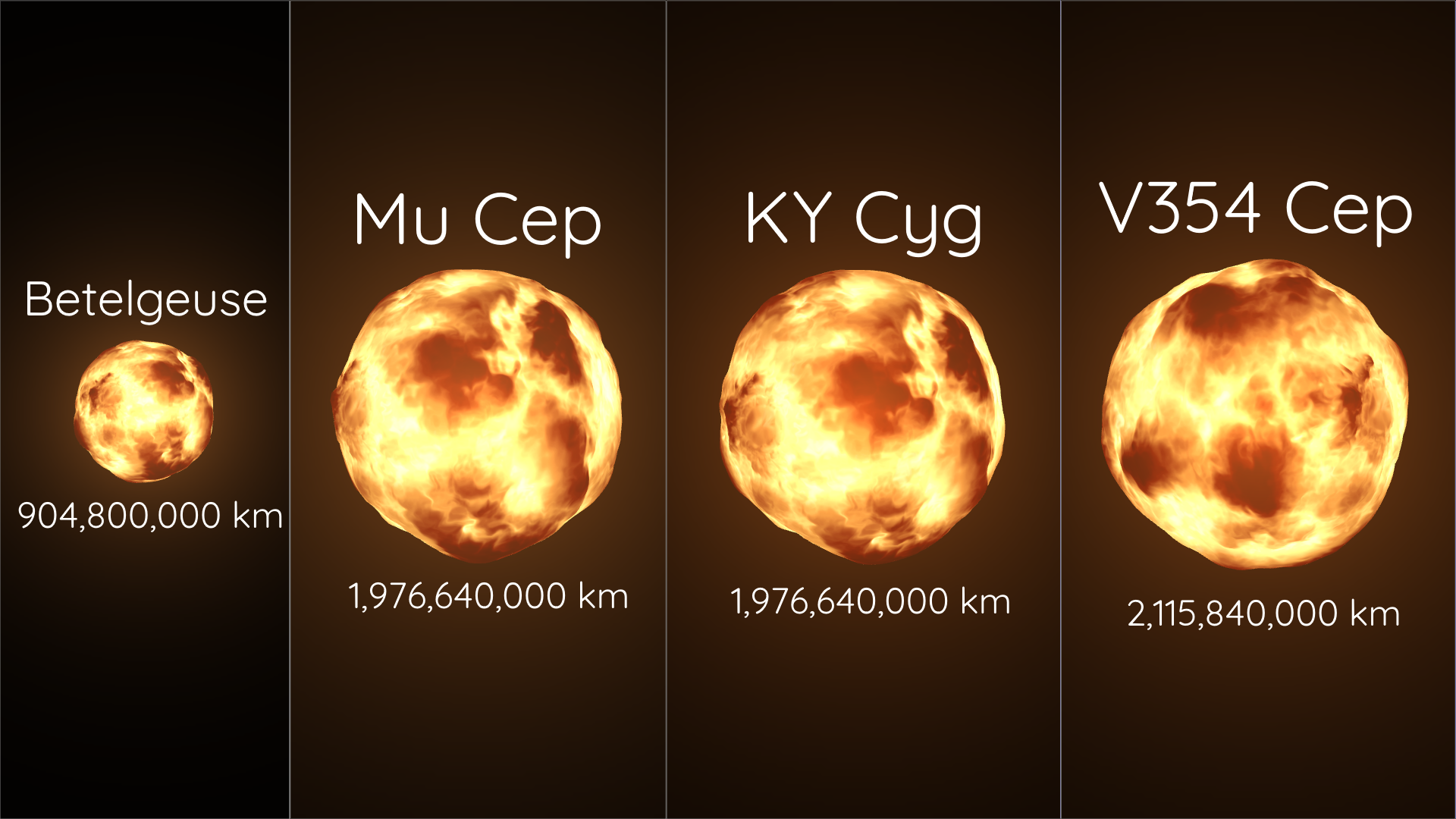
Size comparison of Betelgeuse, Mu Cephei, KY Cygni, and V354 Cephei, according to estimates derived in 2005.

The properties of V354 Cephei are disputed, but the star is classed as a cool supergiant star with a spectral and luminosity class given as M2.5 Iab, indicating it is an intermediate-size luminous supergiant, but was later given as M3.5 Ib, indicating it is rather a less luminous supergiant.

A 2005 study led by Levesque described the four red supergiant stars, KW Sagittarii, V354 Cephei, KY Cygni and Mu Cephei as the largest and most luminous galactic red supergiants with radii of roughly 1,500 R_{☉} and bolometric luminosity of roughly 300,000 L_{☉}, which is consistent with the empirical upper radius and luminosity boundary for the red supergiants at least maintening hydrostatic equilibrium. Despite this, larger sizes and luminosities have been published for a few other galactic red supergiants, such as VV Cephei A and the peculiar star VY Canis Majoris at 1,200–1,900 R_{☉} and more than 3,000 R_{☉}. At a distance of 2.75 kpc, V354 Cephei, based on a MARCS model, was found to be the largest and most luminous of these four stars measured, with a high luminosity of 369,000 L_{☉} and consequently very large size of 1,520 R_{☉} based on the assumption of an effective temperature of 3,650 K.

A 2011 study of the luminosity of V354 Cep determined the luminosity of the star to be somewhat much lower, below 80,000 L_{☉}, despite using the same distance. The study notes the discrepancy but is unable to explain it. There are similar differences in the visual extinctions derived, between two and six magnitudes. Another recently published data assumes the smaller Gaia DR2 distance, and hence derives lower luminosities.

A 2024 measurement using photometry and the Gaia DR3 distance puts V354 Cephei's radius at a value of 1,245 R_{☉}, together with a luminosity of 250,000 L_{☉}, assuming an effective temperature of 3,615 K from an adopted spectral class of M2.5, making it still one of the largest and most luminous known red supergiants.
