= KY Cygni =

Star in the constellation Cygnus

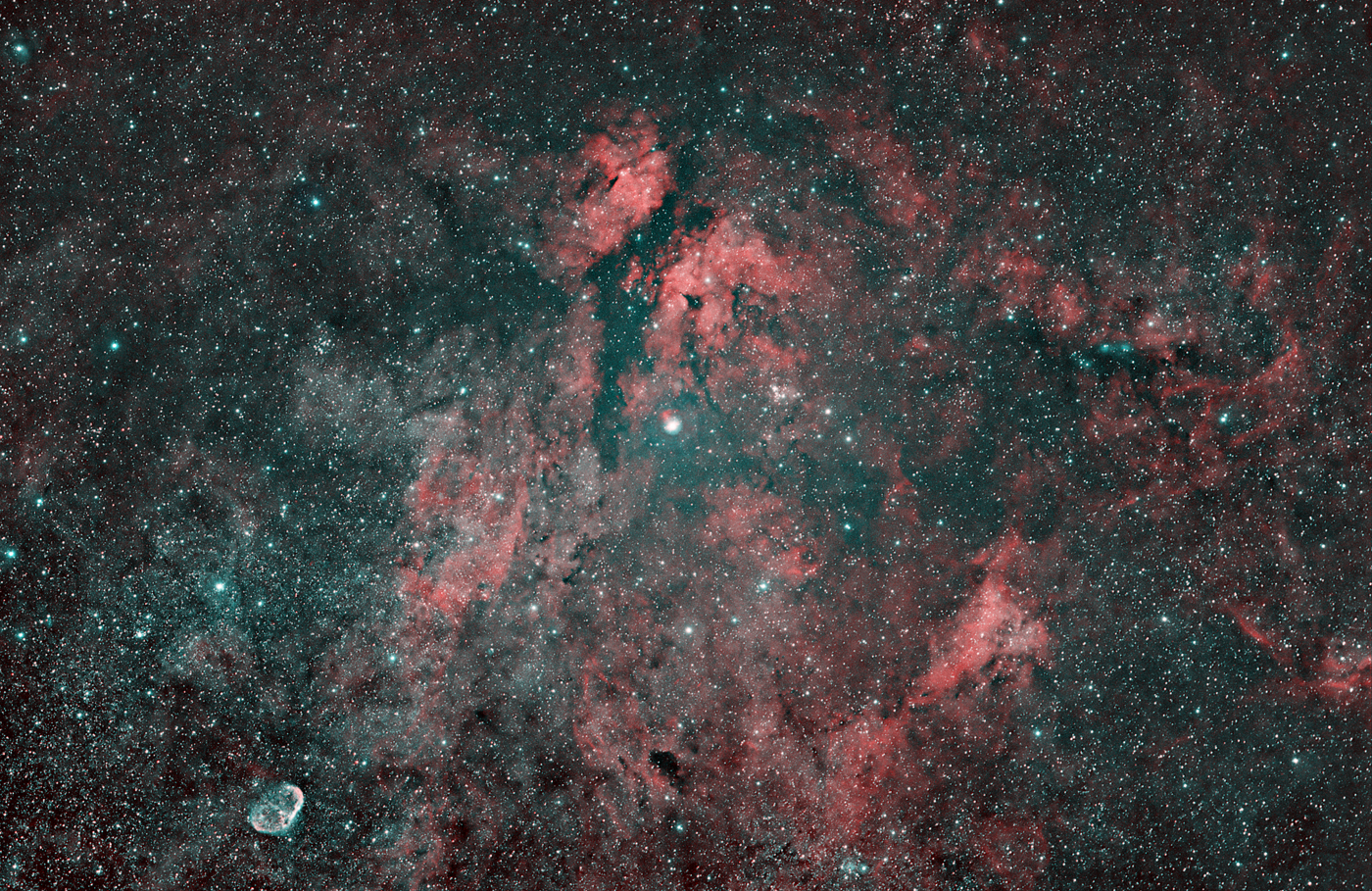
- Location of KY Cygni in the Sadr region (circled, east is up)

Observation data Epoch J2000.0 Equinox J2000.0 (ICRS)
- Constellation: Cygnus
- Right ascension: 20^{h} 25^{m} 58.04^{s}
- Declination: +38° 21′ 07.7″
- Apparent magnitude (V): 10.60 - 11.74

Characteristics
- Evolutionary stage: Red supergiant or hypergiant
- Spectral type: M3 Ia (M3.5 Ia)
- U−B color index: +2.91
- B−V color index: +3.39
- Variable type: Lc

Astrometry
Proper motion (μ)	RA: −3.556 mas/yr Dec.: −6.061 mas/yr
Parallax (π)	0.6687±0.0517 mas
Distance	4,680+350 −390 ly (1,436+106 −119 pc)
Absolute magnitude (M_{V})	−8.18

Details
Mass	19 M_{☉}
Radius	1,032 (Note: Applying the Stefan–Boltzmann law with a nominal solar effective temperature of 5,772 K: $$\sqrt{\biggl(\frac{5,772}{3,535}\biggr)^4 \cdot 10^{5.176}} = 1,032.46\ R_\odot$$.) R_{☉}
Luminosity	150,000 L_{☉}
Surface gravity (log g)	−0.5 cgs
Temperature	3,500±100 K
Age	>9 (Note: This is only the age at which the star enters the red supergiant phase.) Myr

Other designations
- RAFGL 2575, UCAC2 45230193, KY Cyg, TYC 3152-1140-1, GSC 03152-01140, IRAS 20241+3811, IRC +40415, 2MASS J20255805+3821076

Database references
SIMBAD	data

KY Cygni is a variable red supergiant or hypergiant of spectral class M3Ia located in the constellation Cygnus. It is approximately 4,700 light-years away.

== Observations ==
KY Cyg lies near the bright open cluster NGC 6913, but is not thought to be a member. The location is close to the bright star γ Cygni. It was identified as a variable star in 1930, and later named as KY Cygni. The spectrum was given the MK classification of M3 Ia, with only minor adjustments since.

KY Cygni is heavily reddened due to interstellar extinction, losing an estimated 7.75 magnitudes at visual wavelengths. It would be a naked eye star if no light was lost.

== Properties ==
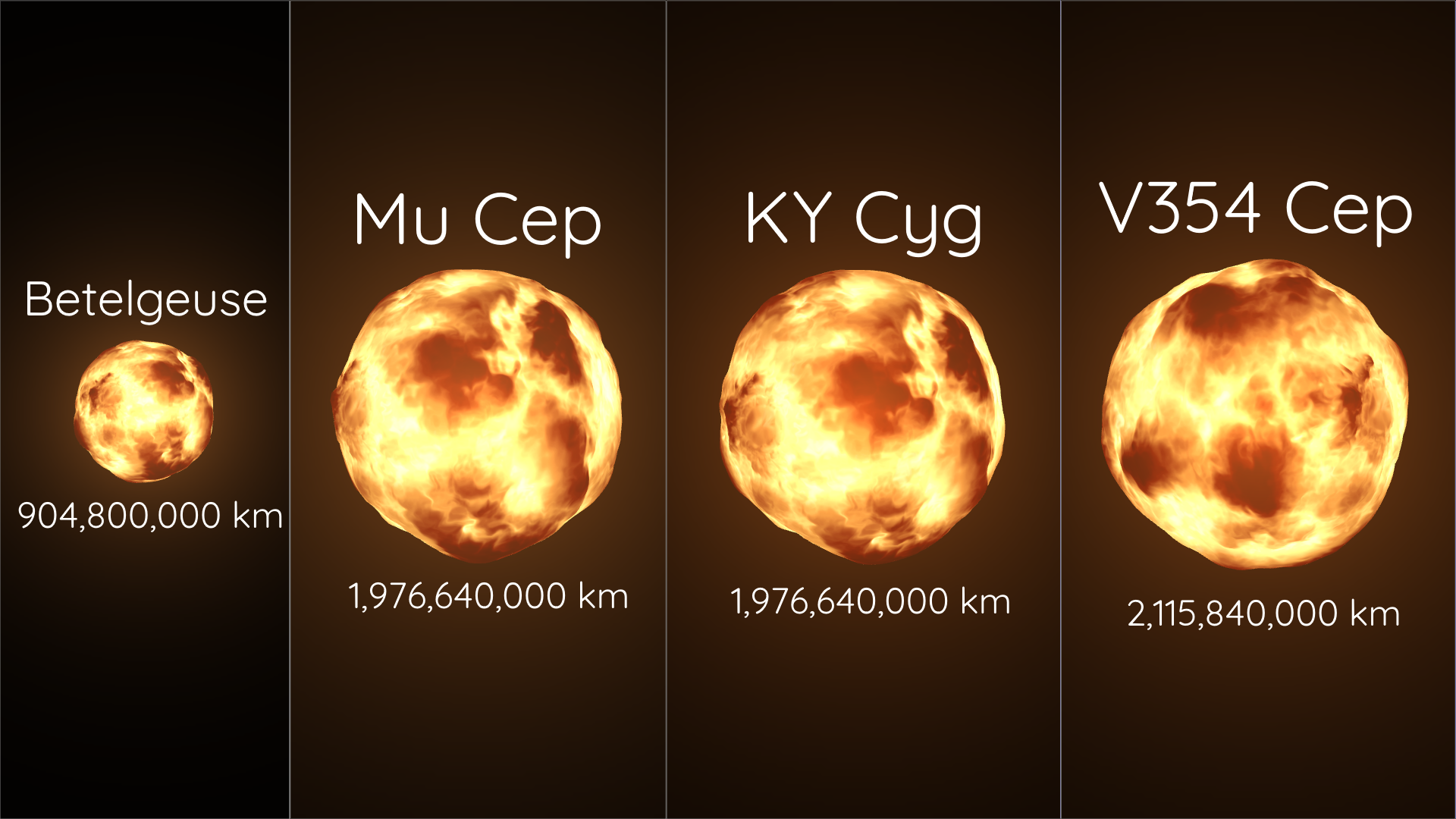
Size comparison of Betelgeuse, Mu Cephei, KY Cygni, and V354 Cephei, according to estimates derived in 2005

KY Cygni is classified as a luminous red supergiant with a strong stellar wind. It is losing mass at around 4.9×10^{−6} M_{☉} and has been described as a cool hypergiant.

Its properties are uncertain, but the effective temperature is around 3,500±100 K. A model fit based on K-band infrared brightness gives a luminosity of 273,000+87,000
−66,000 L_{☉}, corresponding to a radius of 1,420±284 R_{☉}. Based on this radius, it was once described as one of the four largest known red supergiants, along with Mu Cephei, KW Sagittarii, and V354 Cephei. Another model based on visual brightness gives an unexpectedly large luminosity of 1,107,000+352,000
−247,000 L_{☉}, with the difference due mainly to the assumptions about the level of extinction. The radius corresponding to the higher luminosity would be 2,850±570 R_{☉}. These parameters are larger and more luminous than expected for any red supergiant, making them doubtful.

More recently, integration of the spectral energy distributions across a full range of wavelengths from U band to the 60 micron microwave flux gives an even lower luminosity of 138,000 L_{☉}, and a 2020 paper published a luminosity of 150,000 L_{☉}, which give a smaller radius of 1,032 R_{☉} using a spectral type of M4, which suggests an assumed effective temperature of 3,535 K. A 2023 measurement using photometry and the Gaia DR3 parallax puts KY Cygni at a radius value of 883 R_{☉}, together with a luminosity of 117,000 L_{☉}, assuming an effective temperature of 3,550 K from an adopted spectral class of M3.5.

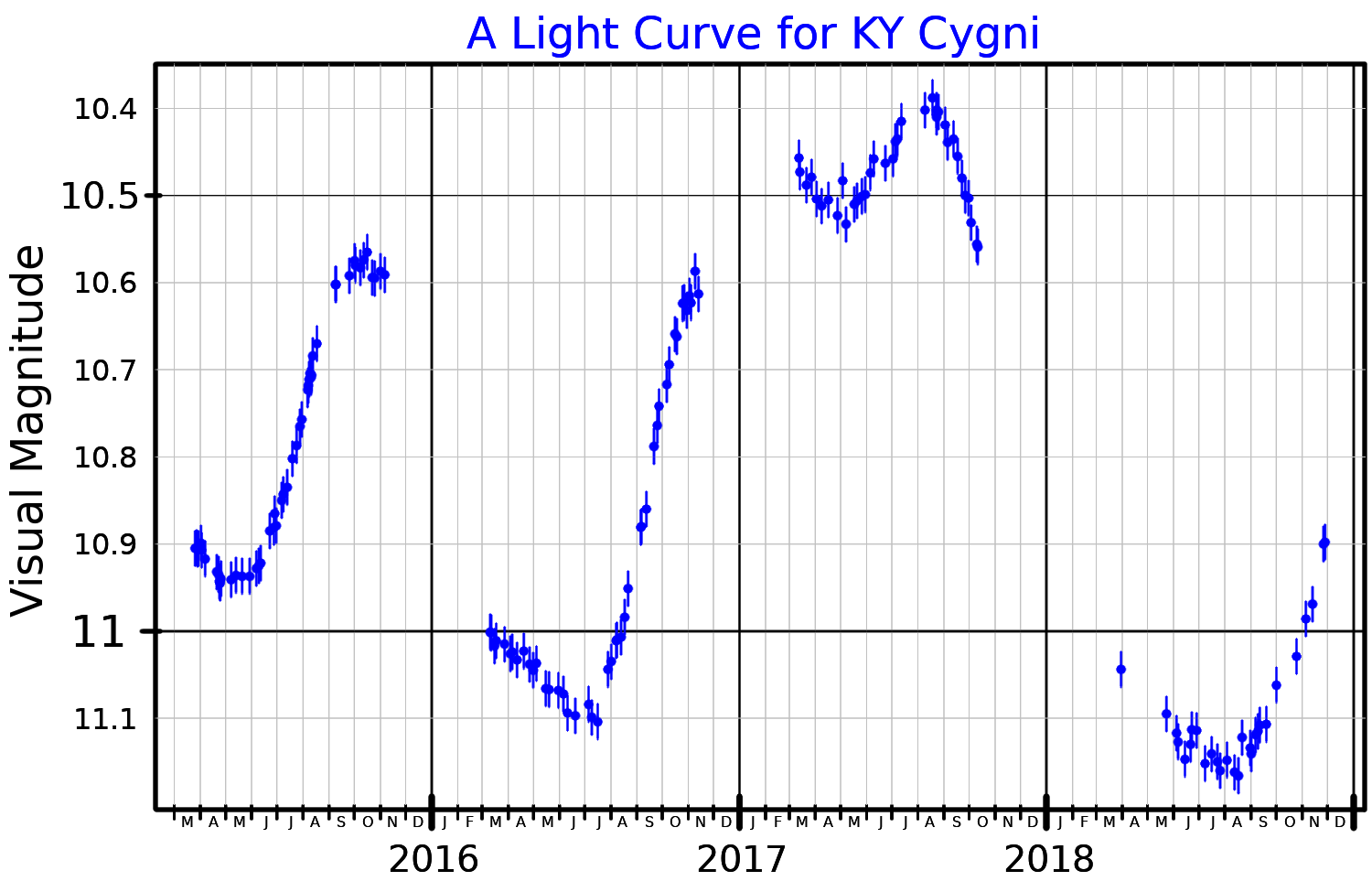
A visual band light curve for KY Cygni, plotted from data published by Kochanek et al. (2017)

KY Cygni is a variable star with a large amplitude but no clear periodicity. At times, it varies rapidly, at others it is fairly constant for long periods. The photographic magnitude range is given as 13.5 – 15.5, while a visual range is 10.60 – 11.74.

== See also ==
- List of largest stars
