= DH Cephei =

Binary star system in the constellation Cepheus

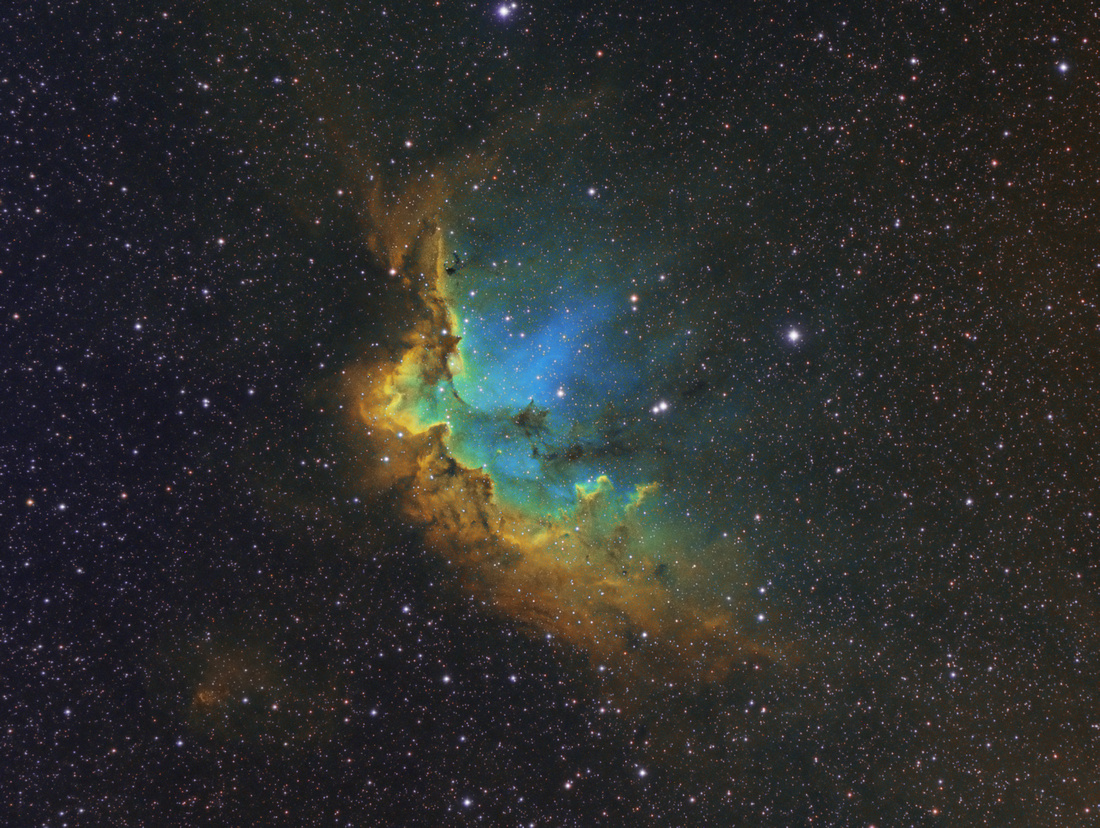
- DH Cephei is at the center of this image of the NGC 7380 complex

Observation data Epoch J2000.0 Equinox ICRS
- Constellation: Cepheus
- Right ascension: 22^{h} 46^{m} 54.111^{s}
- Declination: +58° 05′ 03.53″
- Apparent magnitude (V): 8.61 (8.63 – 8.70)

Characteristics
- Evolutionary stage: Main sequence
- Spectral type: O5.5 V + O6 V
- B−V color index: 0.334±0.041
- Variable type: Ellipsoidal

Astrometry
Radial velocity (R_{v})	−33.4±3.2 km/s
Proper motion (μ)	RA: −2.599±0.014 mas/yr Dec.: −2.236±0.014 mas/yr
Parallax (π)	0.3397±0.0138 mas
Distance	9,600 ± 400 ly (2,900 ± 100 pc)
Absolute magnitude (M_{V})	−4.66±0.25 (A) −4.55±0.25 (B)

Orbit
Period (P)	2.11095 d
Semi-major axis (a)	≥9.79±0.17 R_{☉}
Eccentricity (e)	0.0 (fixed)
Periastron epoch (T)	2,456,525.564±0.006 HJD

Details

A
Mass	25.0 or 38.4±2.5 M_{☉}
Radius	8.31 R_{☉}
Luminosity	2.34×10^{5} L_{☉}
Surface gravity (log g)	4.3±0.3 cgs
Temperature	44,000 K
Rotational velocity (v sin i)	175 km/s

B
Mass	16.8 or 33.4±2.2 M_{☉}
Radius	7.76 R_{☉}
Luminosity	1.86×10^{5} L_{☉}
Surface gravity (log g)	4.3±0.2 cgs
Temperature	43,000 K
Rotational velocity (v sin i)	160 km/s

Other designations
- DH Cep, BD+57° 2607, HD 215835, HIP 112470, WDS 22469+5805

Database references
SIMBAD	data

DH Cephei is a variable binary star system in the northern circumpolar constellation of Cepheus, positioned about two degrees to the east of the star system Delta Cephei. With an apparent visual magnitude of 8.61, it is too faint to be visible without a telescope. Based on parallax measurements, this system is located at a distance of approximately 9.6 kilolight-years (2.9 kiloparsecs) from the Sun. At present it is moving closer to the Earth with a radial velocity of −33 km/s.

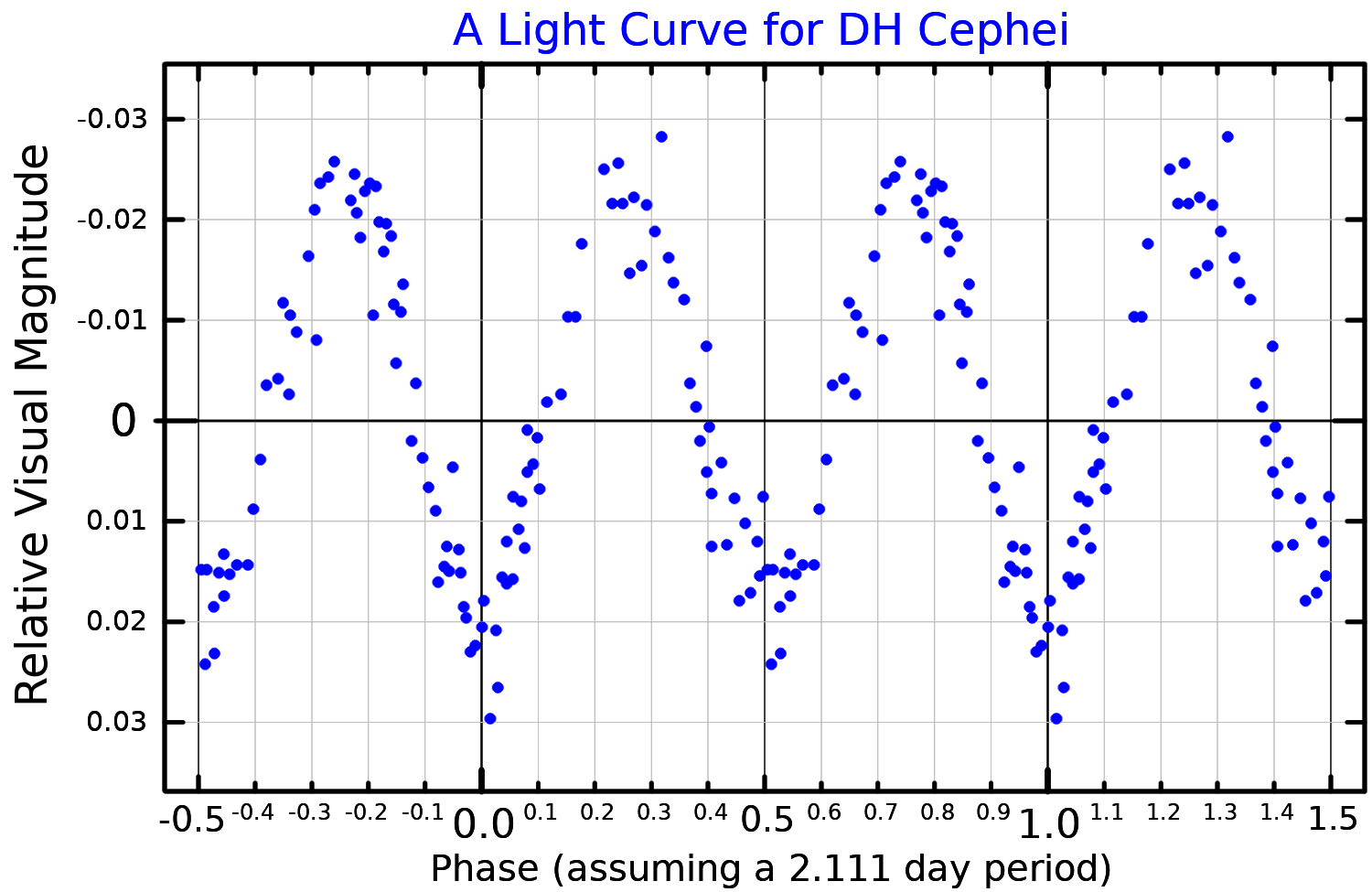
A visual band light curve for DH Cephei, adapted from Lines et al. (1986)

This is a double-lined spectroscopic binary system consisting of two near-identical, massive, O-type main sequence stars. Evolutionary tracks place the stars close to the zero age main sequence, with an age of less than two million years. This is a detached binary with a close orbit having a period of 2.11 days, and the orbit is assumed to have circularized. The orbital plane is estimated to be inclined by an angle of 47°±1° to the line of sight from the Earth, which yields mass estimates of 38 and 34 times the mass of the Sun.

In 1949, Joseph Algernon Pearce derived the orbital elements for DH Cephei (then known as HD 215835) and predicted that the binary pair would show eclipses, although he had no data to prove that. Graham Hill et al. confirmed the predicted variability of star's brightness, in 1976. Although initially suspected to be an eclipsing binary and given a variable star designation, it doesn't appear to be eclipsing. Instead, the system displays ellipsoidal light variations that are caused by tidal distortions.

This system lies at the center of the young open cluster NGC 7380. It is the primary ionizing source for the surrounding H II region designated S142. The pair are a source of X-ray emission, which may be the result of colliding stellar winds. Their measured X-ray luminosity is 3.2×10^{31} erg s^{−1}. The location and rare class of these stars make them an important object for astronomical studies.
