= Mu Cephei =

Red supergiant star in the constellation Cepheus

μ Cephei
- Location of μ Cep (circled)

Observation data Epoch J2000.0 Equinox ICRS
- Constellation: Cepheus
- Right ascension: 21^{h} 43^{m} 30.460^{s}
- Declination: +58° 46′ 48.17″
- Apparent magnitude (V): 3.43–5.1

Characteristics
- Evolutionary stage: Red supergiant
- Spectral type: M2-Ia
- U−B color index: +2.42
- B−V color index: +2.35
- Variable type: SRc

Astrometry
Radial velocity (R_{v})	+20.63 km/s
Proper motion (μ)	RA: 3.439 mas/yr Dec.: −4.108 mas/yr
Parallax (π)	0.55±0.20 mas
Distance	1,370+190 −140 ly (421+57 −42 pc)
Absolute magnitude (M_{V})	−7.63±0.30

Details
Mass	11 M_{☉}
Radius	762 R_{☉}
Luminosity	110,000 L_{☉}
Surface gravity (log g)	–0.36 cgs
Temperature	3,800 K
Age	10.0±0.1 Myr

Other designations
- Garnet Star, Herschel's Garnet Star, Erakis, μ Cep, BD+58°2316, HD 206936, HIP 107259, HR 8316, SAO 33693

Database references
SIMBAD	data

Mu Cephei is a red supergiant star in the northern constellation Cepheus. It is officially named the Garnet Star; Mu Cephei is its Bayer designation, which is Latinized from μ Cephei and abbreviated Mu Cep or μ Cep. This star appears garnet red and is located at the edge of the IC 1396 nebula. It is a 4th magnitude star easily visible to the naked eye under good observing conditions. Since 1943, the spectrum of this star has served as a spectral standard by which other stars are classified.

Mu Cephei appears to lie within the Cepheus OB2 stellar association, one of the nearest known to Earth, which is located within a kiloparsec (3,000 light-years) away, and may be one of a smaller group of stars within the association or an unrelated foreground supergiant. In either case, it is one of the largest known stars by radius, and were it placed in the Sun's position, it would at least engulf the orbit of Mars and the asteroid belt.

== History ==
Zooming to the μ Cep (Garnet star) in the constellation Cepheus.

The deep red color of Mu Cephei was noted by William Herschel, who described it as "a very fine deep garnet colour, such as the periodical star ο Ceti". It is thus commonly known as Herschel's "Garnet Star". Mu Cephei was called Garnet sidus by Giuseppe Piazzi in his catalogue. An alternative name, Erakis, used in Antonín Bečvář's star catalogue, is probably due to confusion with Mu Draconis, which was previously called al-Rāqis [arˈraːqis] in Arabic. The IAU Working Group on Star Names approved the name Garnet Star for Mu Cephei on 19 September 2024 and it is now so entered in the IAU Catalog of Star Names.

In 1848, English astronomer John Russell Hind discovered that Mu Cephei was variable. This variability was quickly confirmed by German astronomer Friedrich Wilhelm Argelander. Almost continual records of the star's variability have been maintained since 1881.

The angular diameter of μ Cephei has been measured interferometrically. One of the most recent measurements gives a diameter of 18.672±0.435 mas at 800 μm, modelled as a limb-darkened disk 20.584±0.480 mas across. However, this later turned out to be the surrounding molecular layer and not the actual star, as the star has an angular diameter of 14.11±0.6 mas. μ Cephei was used as one of the original "dagger stars", those with well-defined spectra that could be used for the classification of other stars, for MK spectral classifications. In 1943 it was the standard star for M2 Ia, updated in 1980 to be the standard star for the new type M2- Ia.

== Distance ==
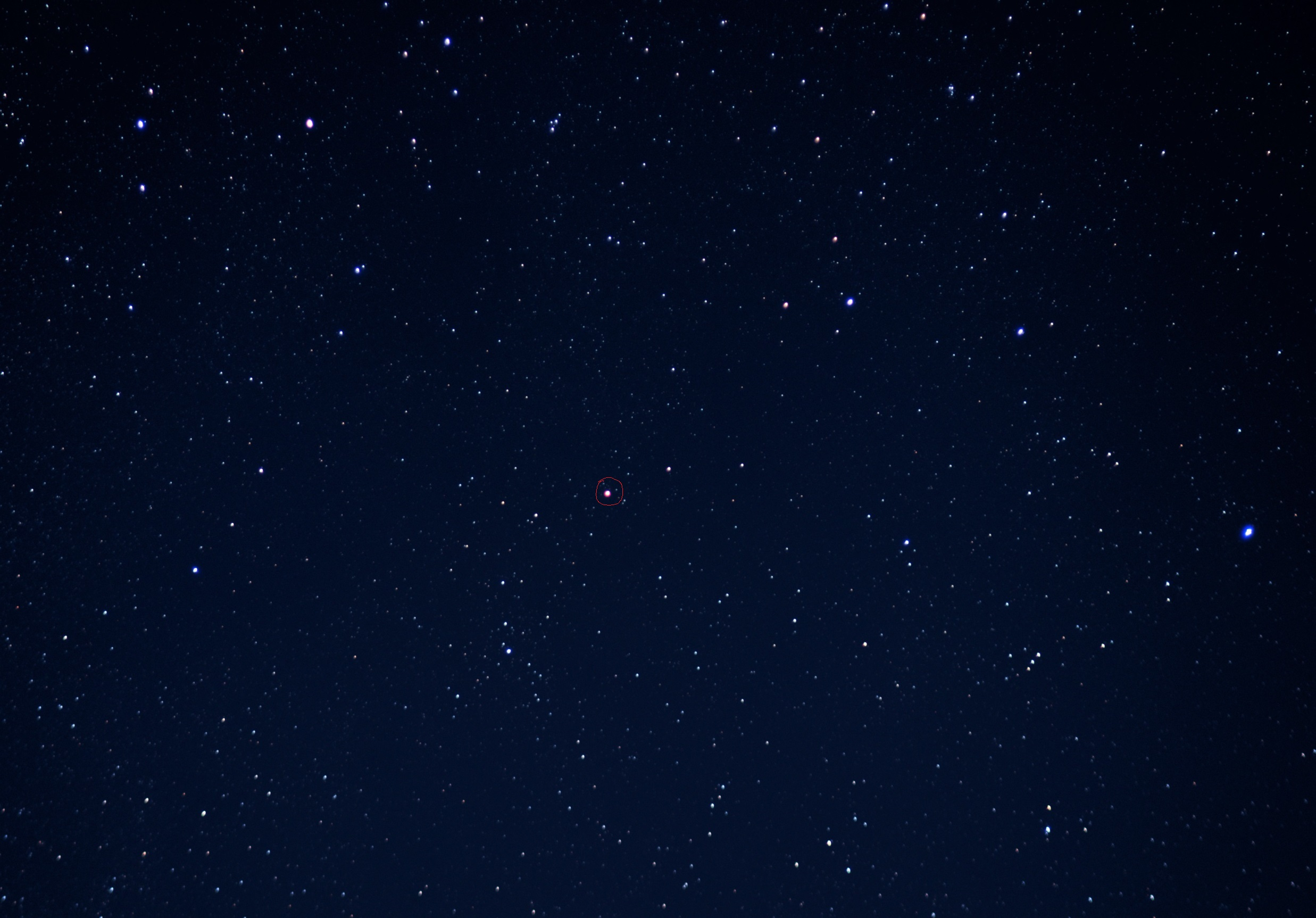
Mu Cephei (circled) as can be seen in binoculars. The bright star on the right is Alderamin (Alpha Cephei).

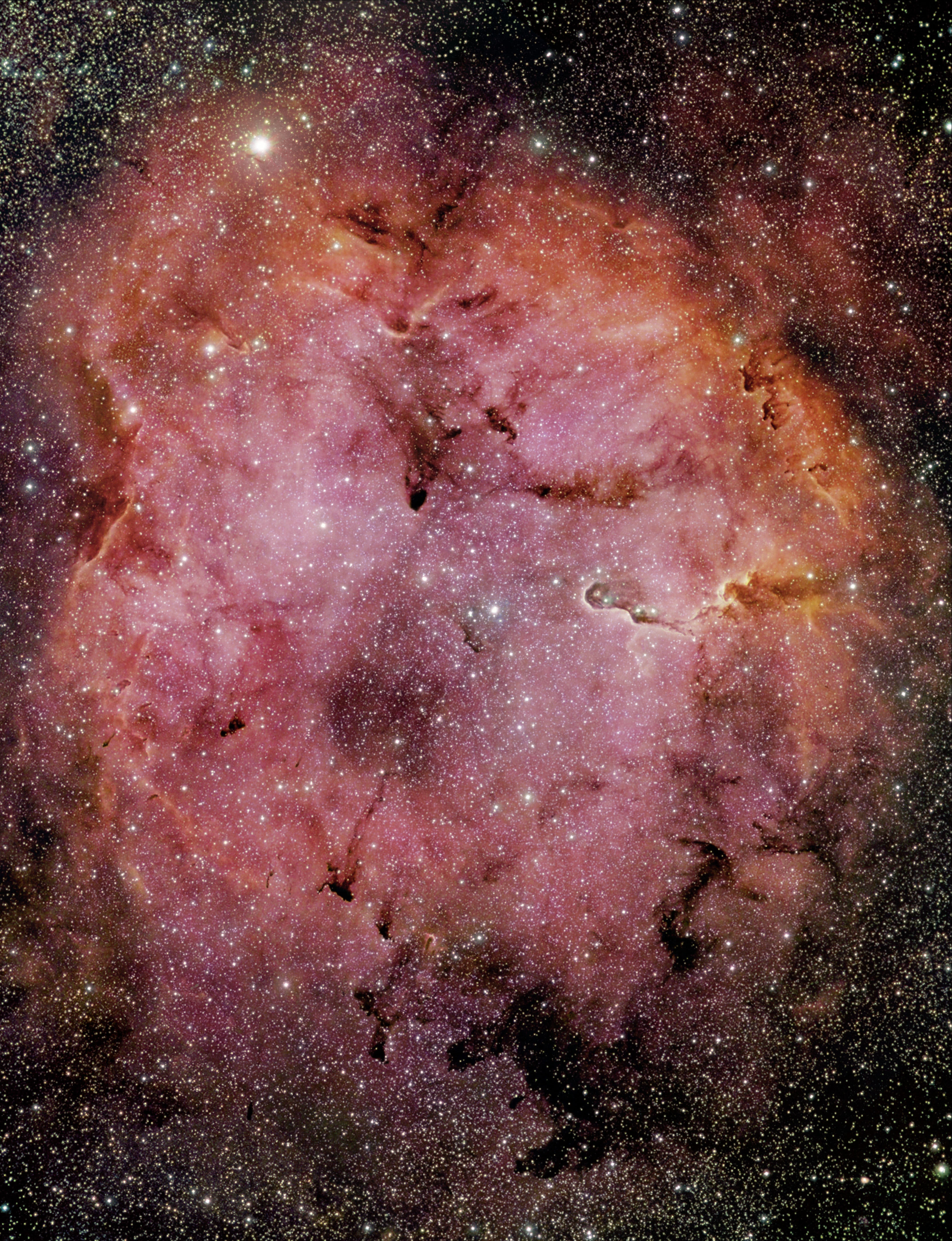
IC 1396 with μ Cephei towards the top (north)

The distance to Mu Cephei is not very well known. The star is frequently considered a member of the Cepheus OB2 association, located about 800 to 1,000 parsecs away from the Sun, or a smaller group referred to as Cepheus OB2-A. Averaging the distances of nearby luminous stars with similar reddening and reliable Gaia Data Release 2 parallaxes gives a similar distance of 940 pc.

On the other hand, several studies suggest Mu Cephei has similar properties to those of Betelgeuse, implying a closer distance. In addition, the latest research in 2026 casts doubt on the star's membership of Cepheus OB2 based on its surroundings. A determination of the distance based upon a size comparison with Betelgeuse gives an estimate of 390±140 parsecs. In 2019, calculations of the distance from the measured angular diameter, surface brightness, and calculated luminosity lead to 641 pc. In 2026, a spectroscopic determination of the stellar luminosity, coupled with an interferometric size measurement, favors a distance of 421+57
−42 pc.

Earlier calculation from the Hipparcos satellite was used to measure a parallax of 0.55±0.20 mas, which corresponds to an estimated distance of 1,800 parsecs. However, this value is close to the margin of error.

== Variability ==
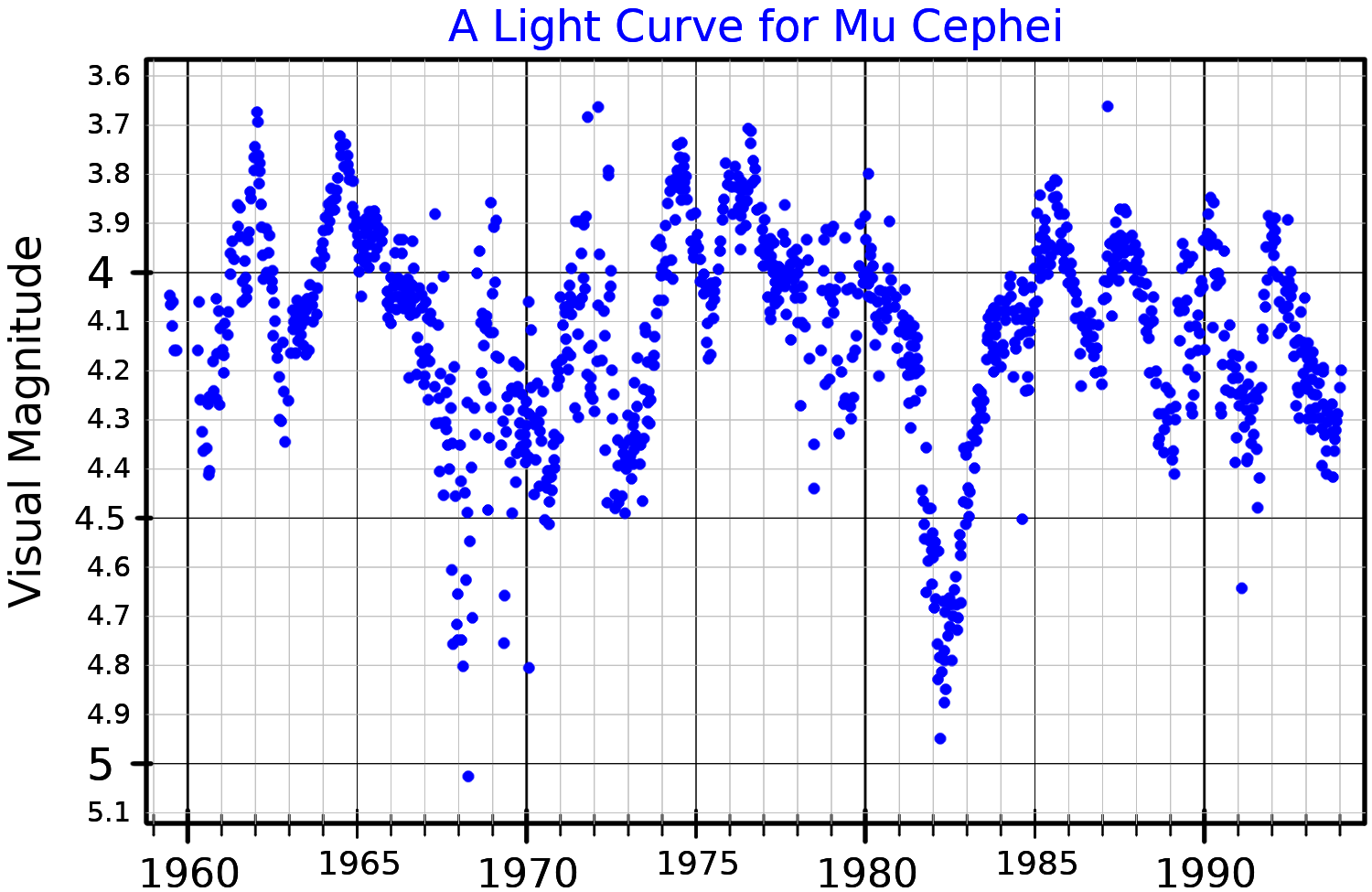
A visual band light curve for Mu Cephei, adapted from Brelstaff et al. (1997)

Mu Cephei is a variable star and the prototype of the obsolete class of the Mu Cephei variables. It is now considered to be a semiregular variable of type SRc. Its apparent brightness varies erratically between magnitude 3.4 and 5.1. Many different periods have been reported, but they are consistently near 860 days or 4,400 days.

== Properties ==
As a red supergiant, Mu Cephei is among the largest stars visible to the naked eye by physical size. It is a runaway star with a peculiar velocity of 80.7±17.7 km/s. It is around or more than 100,000 times more luminous than the Sun, and has an absolute visual magnitude of −7.6.

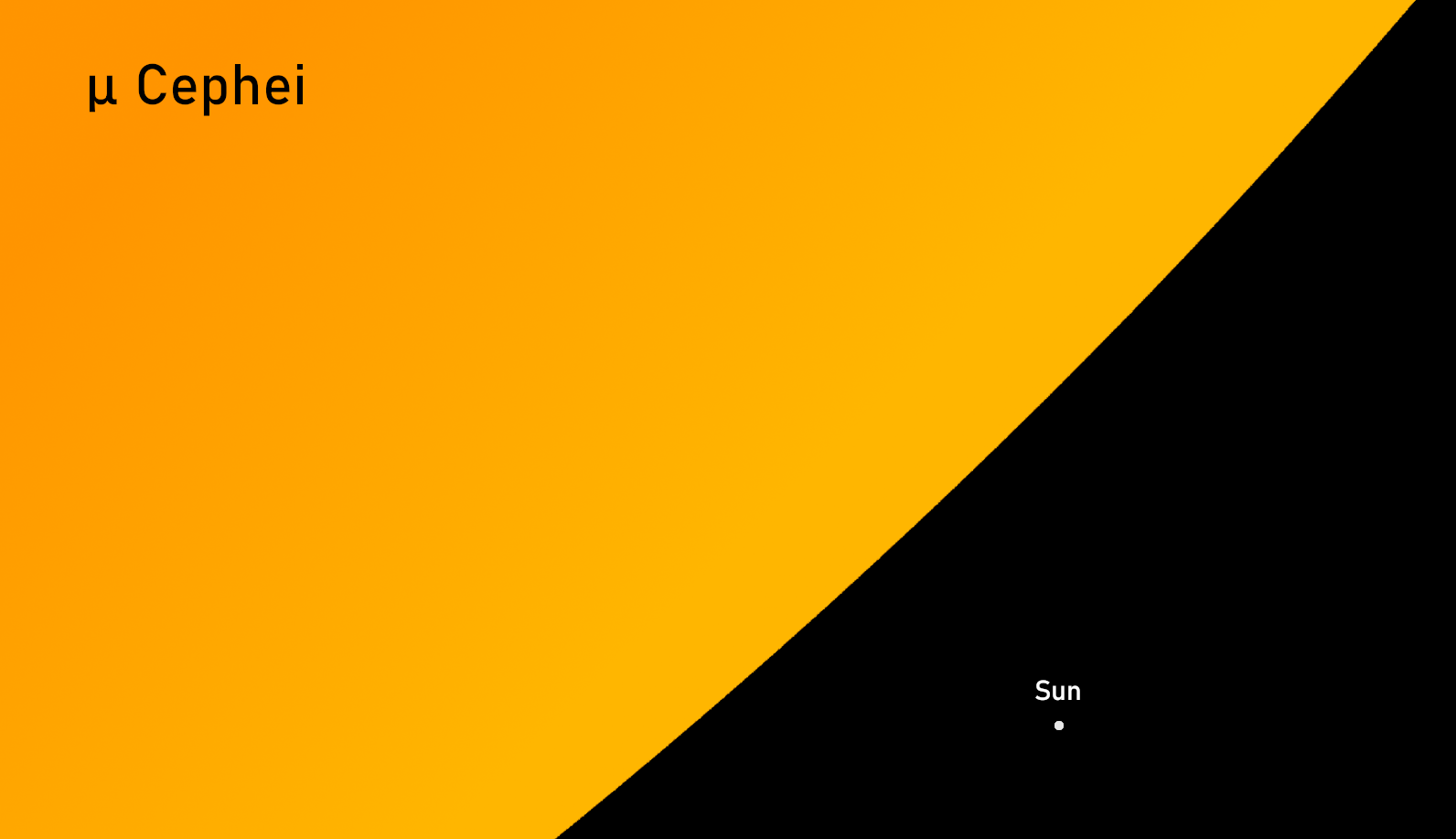
Size comparison of μ Cephei and the Sun assuming the former as a Cepheus OB2 member.

Assuming µ Cephei as a member of the Cepheus OB2 association, it would be one of the largest, most luminous and massive cool supergiants in the Milky Way, with properties comparable to those of PZ Cassiopeiae and VY Canis Majoris. It was therefore sometimes described as a hypergiant. At a distance of 940 pc, the bolometric luminosity, summed over all wavelengths, was calculated by integrating the spectral energy distribution (SED) to be 269,000 L_{☉}. Its effective temperature of 3,750 K, determined from colour index relations, implies a radius of 1,259 R_{☉}, assuming a luminosity of 283,000 L_{☉} at a distance of 830 pc. Other recent publications give similar effective temperatures. Earlier calculations of the luminosity in 2005 from a visual and infrared colour relation give 340,000 L_{☉} and a corresponding radius of 1,420 R_{☉}. Based on this radius, it was once described as one of the four largest known red supergiants, along with KY Cygni, KW Sagittarii, and V354 Cephei. An even earlier estimate made based on its angular diameter, luminosity estimates, and an assumed distance of 2,400–2,800 light years gives it a radius of 1,450–1,650 R_{☉}. It was hence considered one of the two largest known stars, along with VV Cephei A at 1,600–1,900 R_{☉}. However, the angular diameter used to calculate the larger value later turned out to be the diameter of the molecular layer around the star.

Assuming closer distance estimates based on comparison with parameters estimated for Betelgeuse, studies calculated lower properties, hence smaller radii. Assuming a distance of 390±140 parsecs, the radius has been estimated to be 830 R_{☉} in 2010 based on an effective temperature of 3,660 K and a luminosity of 111,200 L_{☉}. A 2019 paper measurement based on the 641+148
−144 pc distance gives the star a luminosity below 140,000 L_{☉} and a correspondingly radius of 972±228 R_{☉}, and as well as a lower temperature of 3,551±136 K. A 2026 paper estimated a radius of 762 R_{☉} based on a distance of 421+57
−42 pc and an angular diameter of 16.85±0.15 mas. The corresponding luminosity at this distance is 110,000 L_{☉}.

Depending on the luminosity of the star, the initial mass of Mu Cephei has been estimated from its position relative to theoretical stellar evolutionary tracks to be between 15 M_{☉} and 25 M_{☉}. The star currently has a mass loss rate of (4.9±1.0)×10^{−7} M_{☉} per year.

== Surroundings ==
Mu Cephei is surrounded by a spherical shell of ejected material that extends outward to an angular distance of 6″ with an expansion velocity of 10 km s^{−1}. This indicates an age of about 2,000–3,000 years for the shell. Closer to the star, this material shows a pronounced asymmetry, which may be shaped as a torus. Infrared observations suggest the presence of a wide ring of dust and water with an inner radius about twice that of the star itself, extending to about four times the radius of the star.

== Supernova ==
Mu Cephei is nearing death. It has begun to fuse helium into carbon, whereas a main sequence star fuses hydrogen into helium. When a supergiant star has converted elements in its core to iron, the core collapses to produce a supernova and the star is destroyed, leaving behind a vast gaseous cloud and a small, dense remnant. For a star as massive as Mu Cephei, the remnant is likely to be a black hole. The most massive red supergiants will evolve back to blue supergiants, Luminous blue variables, or Wolf-Rayet stars before their cores collapse, and Mu Cephei appears to be massive enough for this to happen. A post-red supergiant will produce a type IIn or type II-b supernova, while a Wolf–Rayet star will produce a type Ib or Ic supernova.

== Components ==
There are several faint stars within two arc-minutes of Mu Cephei and listed in multiple star catalogues (eg. WDS J21435+5847 and CCDM J21435+5847).

Component	Right ascension	Declination	Apparent magnitude	Database reference
B	21^{h} 43^{m} 28.0^{s}	+58° 46′ 45″	12.3	Gaia DR3
C	21^{h} 43^{m} 25.7^{s}	+58° 47′ 07″	12.7	Simbad
D	21^{h} 43^{m} 29.5^{s}	+58° 47′ 32″	13.0	Gaia DR3
E	21^{h} 43^{m} 28.7^{s}	+58° 46′ 48″	13.0	Gaia DR3
F	21^{h} 43^{m} 33.4^{s}	+58° 48′ 00″	13.0	Gaia DR3
G	21^{h} 43^{m} 27.8^{s}	+58° 46′ 45″	11.0	Simbad

== See also ==
- 119 Tauri – Another red supergiant comparable to Betelgeuse
- Antares – Another red supergiant comparable to Betelgeuse
- B90 – Another red supergiant comparable to Betelgeuse, although more luminous and redder
- Stephenson 2 DFK 1 – A red supergiant member of Stephenson 2 once considered to have a doubtful membership
- Westerlund 1 W237 A red supergiant member of Westerlund 1 once considered to have a doubtful membership
