= NGC 7380 =

Open cluster in the constellation Cepheus

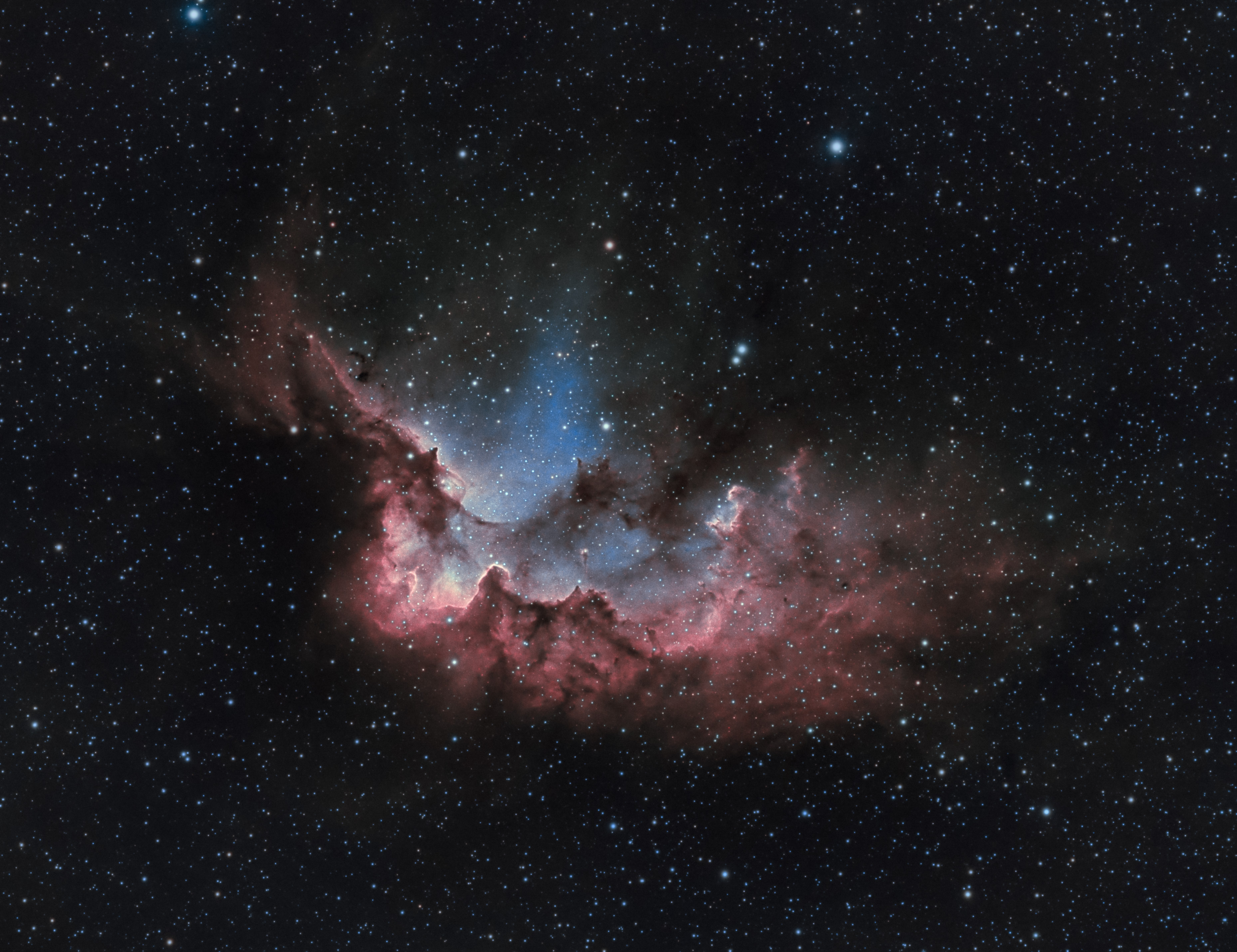
- NGC 7380 in classic Hubble Palette (Ha/OIII/SII) by amateur astronomer Chuck Ayoub

Observation data (J2000.0 epoch)
- Right ascension: 22^{h} 47^{m} 21.0^{s}
- Declination: +58° 07′ 54″
- Distance: 8.5 ± 1.3 kly (2.6 ± 0.4 kpc)
- Apparent magnitude (V): 7.2
- Apparent dimensions (V): 25′

Physical characteristics
- Radius: ~20 ly (6 pc)
- Estimated age: 4 to 11.9 Myr
- Other designations: NGC 7380, Sh2-142, Cr 452

Associations
- Constellation: Cepheus

NGC 7380 is a young open cluster of stars in the northern circumpolar constellation of Cepheus, discovered by Caroline Herschel in 1787. The surrounding emission nebulosity is known colloquially as the Wizard Nebula, which spans an angle of 25′. German-born astronomer William Herschel included his sister's discovery in his catalog, and labelled it H VIII.77. The nebula is known as S 142 in the 1959 Sharpless catalog (Sh2-142). It is extremely difficult to observe visually, usually requiring very dark skies and an O-III filter. The NGC 7380 complex is located at a distance of approximately 8.5 kilolight-years from the Sun, in the Perseus Arm of the Milky Way.

The cluster spans ~20 light-years (6 pc) with an elongated shape and an extended tail. Age estimates range from 4 to 11.9 million years. At the center of the cluster lies DH Cephei, a close, double-lined spectroscopic binary system consisting of two massive O-type stars. This pair are the primary ionizing source for the surrounding H II region, and are driving out the surrounding gas and dust while triggering star formation in the neighboring region. Of the variable stars that have been identified in the cluster, 14 have been identified as pre-main sequence stars while 17 are main sequence stars that are primarily B-type variables.

The most commonly used nickname for this nebula is the Wizard Nebula. In his 2007 book Deep-Sky Companions: Hidden Treasures, Stephen James O'Meara called it "Harry Potter and the Golden Snitch".

== Gallery ==
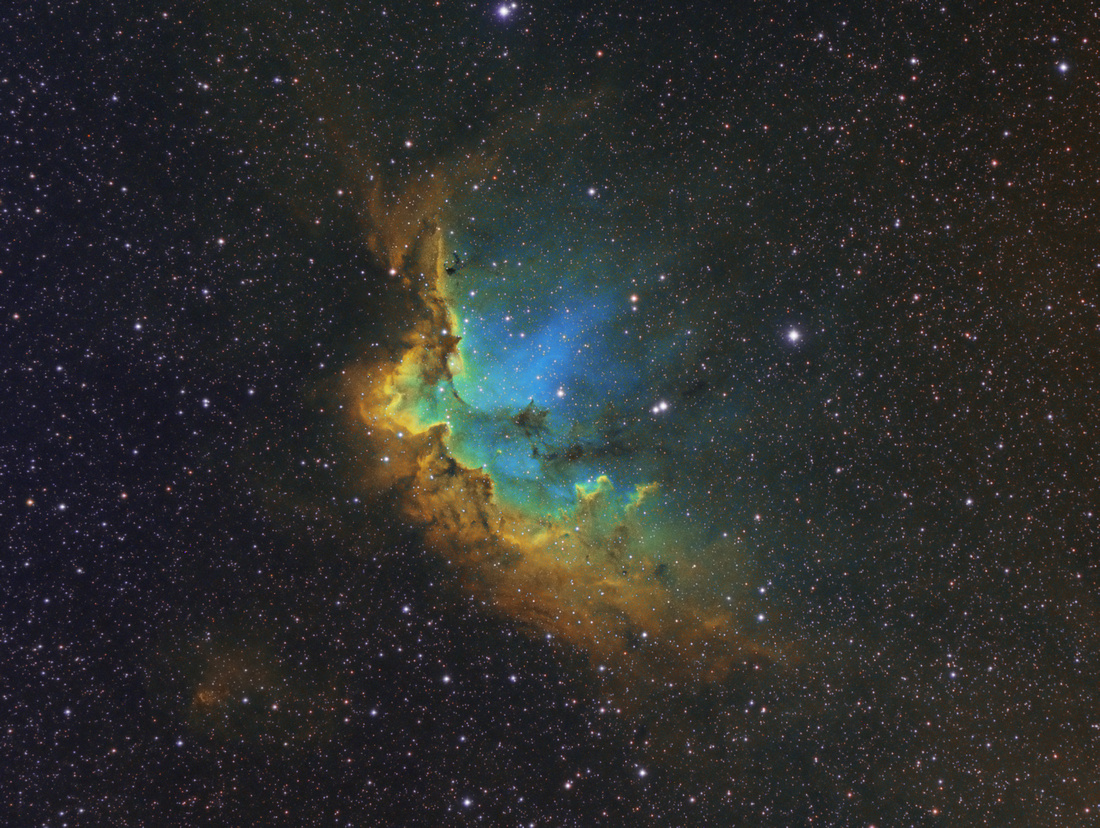
NGC 7380 in Hubble Palette (Ha/OIII/SII)

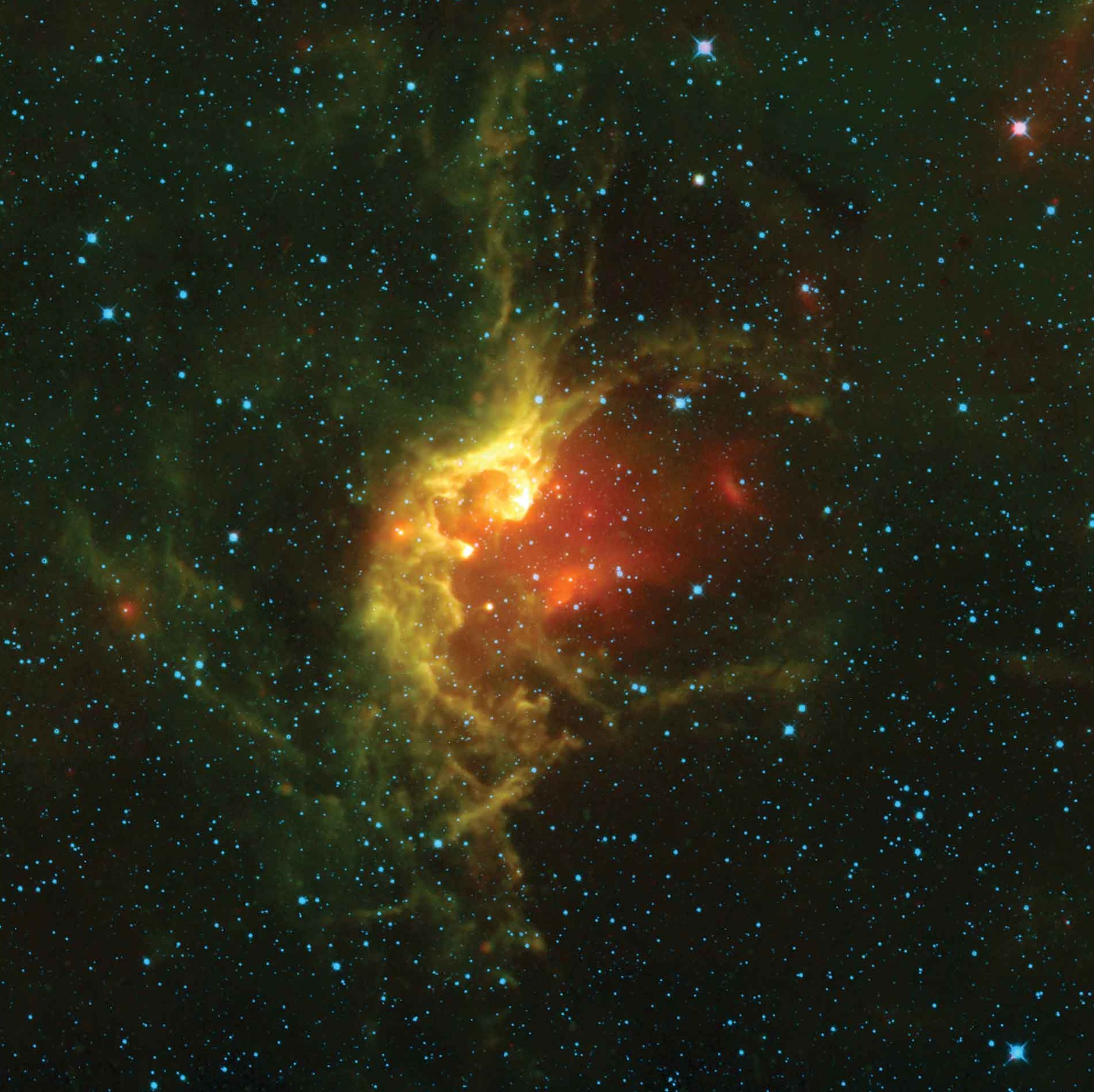
NGC 7380 from WISE.

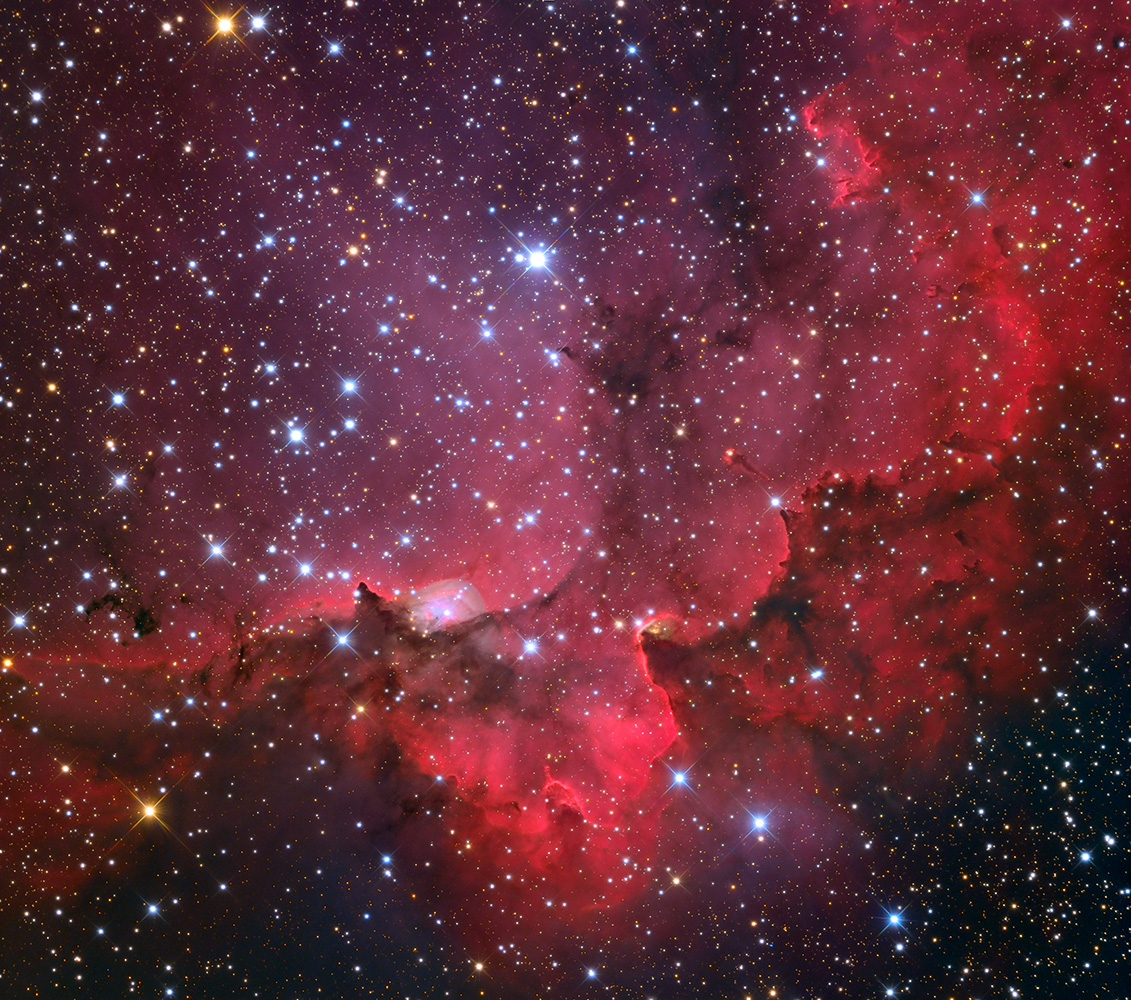
NGC 7380 from the Mount Lemmon SkyCenter using the 0.8m Schulman Telescope.Broadband (RGB) image.

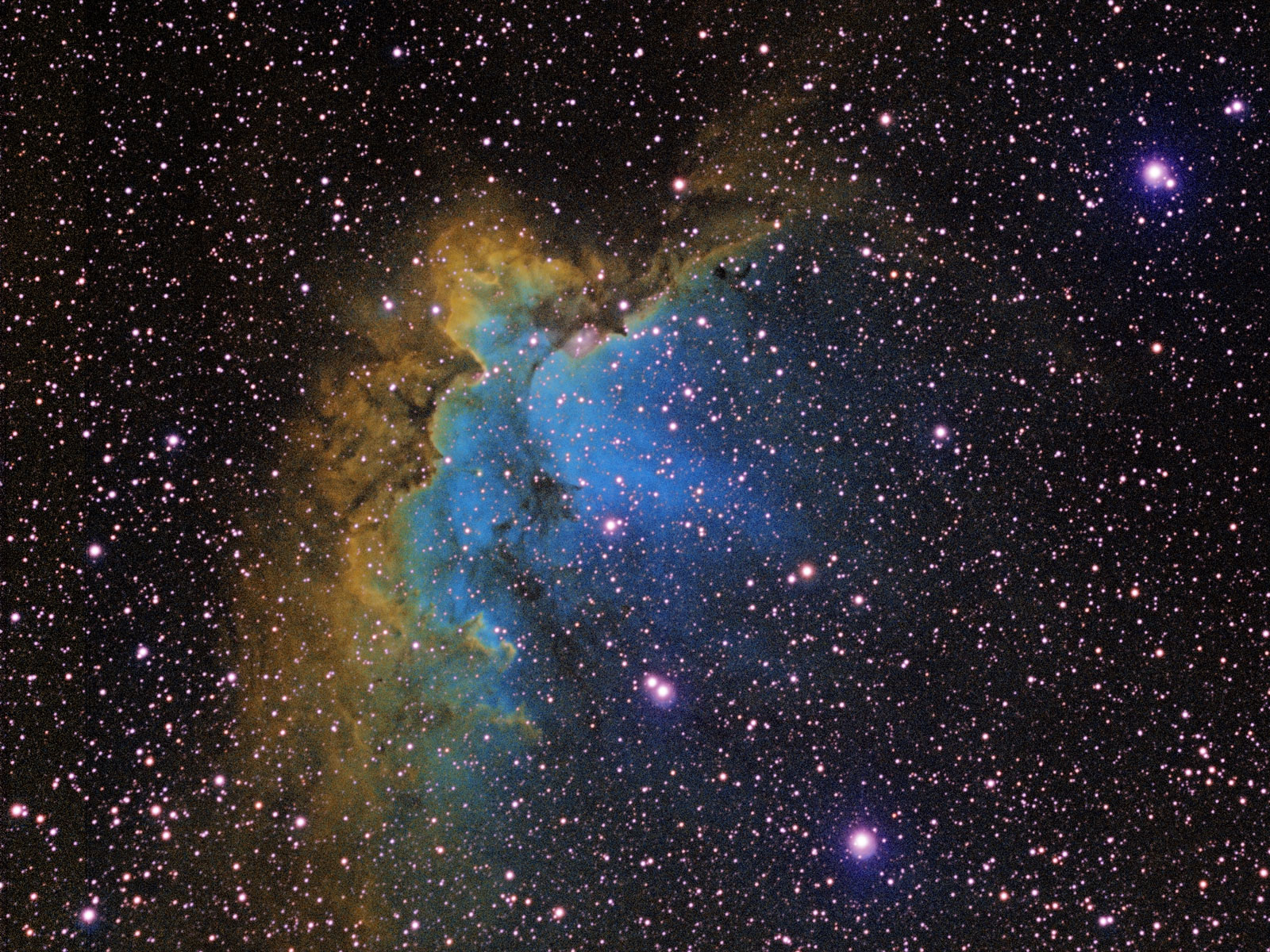
NGC7380 Nebula from South Common Observatory
