= S stars =

S stars, S star, S-stars, or S-star may refer to:

- S-type star, a late-type giant star, a cool giant with approximately equal quantities of carbon and oxygen in its atmosphere
- Stars around the supermassive black hole at the Milky Way galactic centre, associated with radio source Sagittarius A*
  - S2 (star)
  - S55 (star) or S0–102
  - S62 (star)
- S*, or S star, a collaboration between seven universities and the Karolinska Institutet of Sweden to provide course material for training in bioinformatics and genomics
