= S301 =

Star in a close orbit around Sagittarius A*

Characteristics
- Evolutionary stage: Main-sequence star

Orbit
Name	Sagittarius A*
Period (P)	8.68 yr
Semi-major axis (a)	0.0830″
Eccentricity (e)	0.982–0.983
Periastron epoch (T)	2023.125

Other designations
- S301

S301 is a faint main-sequence star orbiting Sagittarius A* (Sgr A*), the supermassive black hole at the centre of the Milky Way. Its discovery was reported by the GRAVITY collaboration in August 2026. At its closest approach to the black hole, S301 reaches a speed of about 25,000 km/s (16,000 mi/s), more than 8% of the speed of light, making it the fastest known star in the Milky Way at the time of its discovery.

S301 follows a highly eccentric orbit with a period of about 8.7 years, the shortest securely established orbital period of any star around Sagittarius A*. At pericentre, it approaches to about 12 astronomical units (AU) from the black hole, roughly comparable to the distance between the Sun and Saturn (it exceeds Saturn's average orbital radius by only 24%). Its close orbit makes S301 a potentially important probe of general relativity, and continued observations could enable the first direct measurement of the spin of Sagittarius A*.

== Discovery and characteristics ==
S301 was first identified in observations made in the spring of 2023 using GRAVITY, a near-infrared interferometric instrument on the Very Large Telescope Interferometer (VLTI) in Chile. After determining a preliminary orbit, astronomers identified the star retrospectively in observations from 2021 and, more weakly, in data from 2017. A total of 19 astrometric measurements spanning more than eight years were used to determine its orbit.

The star has a K-band apparent magnitude of about 19.3 and is thought to be an ordinary main-sequence star. Its brightness is consistent with a late A-type or early F-type star, with the researchers estimating a spectral type of approximately F1.5. Its mass is estimated at 1.1–1.5 times that of the Sun and its radius at approximately 1.4–1.6 solar radii.

Spectroscopic observations had not measured S301's radial velocity at the time of its discovery. Consequently, two possible three-dimensional orientations of its orbit remained consistent with the astrometric observations.

== Orbit and relativity ==
S301 has a semi-major axis of about 83 milliarcseconds and an orbital eccentricity of approximately 0.983. Its highly elongated orbit brings it to within about 136–142 Schwarzschild radii of Sagittarius A*, around ten times closer than the well-studied star S2. At pericentre, its calculated velocity is approximately 25,000–25,600 km/s, or 8.3–8.5% of the speed of light.

The orbit experiences strong relativistic effects. Its predicted Schwarzschild precession is approximately 1.9–2.0 degrees per orbit, substantially greater than that measured for S2. Because S301 passes so close to Sagittarius A*, its motion should also be affected by frame-dragging, or Lense–Thirring precession, caused by the rotation of the black hole.

Researchers estimate that continued astrometric measurements with GRAVITY and GRAVITY+, combined with future spectroscopy using the Extremely Large Telescope, could make the effect of the black hole's spin measurable within roughly a decade. Such observations could provide a direct measurement of both the magnitude and orientation of Sagittarius A*'s spin and offer additional tests of the Kerr metric and general relativity.

The extreme eccentricity of S301's orbit suggests that the star may once have belonged to a compact binary star system that passed close to Sagittarius A*. In this scenario, known as the Hills mechanism, the black hole disrupted the binary, capturing S301 into its present orbit while ejecting its former companion as a hypervelocity star.

== See also ==
- S2 (star)
- S0-102
- Sagittarius A* cluster
- Galactic Center
