= Karine Perraut =

French astronomer

Karine Rousselet-Perraut is a French astronomer at Grenoble Alpes University, affiliated with the Institute for Planetary sciences and Astrophysics, Grenoble (IPAG).

== Research ==
Perraut defended her doctorate in 1995 at Paul Cézanne University, directed by Farrokh Vakili. Her astronomical training concerned the development of scientific instrumentation, with a thesis modeling the effects of polarization on optical interferometry in astronomy.

Her subsequent research has used optical and infrared interferometry to study protoplanetary disks, through observations on the Very Large Telescope in Chile. She has also used the Very Large Telescope to study the orbital precession of the star S2 around Sagittarius A*, the black hole at the center of the Milky Way, confirming the consistency of its motion with the theory of general relativity.

== Recognition ==
Perraut was one of the leaders of the GRAVITY instrument of the Very Large Telescope interferometer, which received the 2019 La Recherche prize for its observations of Sagittarius A*.

Perraut received a CNRS Silver Medal in 2024.
