= Sagittarius A* cluster =

Star cluster orbiting Sagittarius A*

Inferred orbits of 6 stars around the supermassive black hole Sagittarius A* at the Milky Way's center

The Sagittarius A* cluster is the cluster of stars in close orbit around Sagittarius A*, the supermassive black hole at the center of the Milky Way (in the Galactic Center). The individual stars are often listed as "S-stars", but their names and IDs are not formalized, and stars can have different numbers in different catalogues.

One of the most studied stars is S2, a relatively bright star that also passes close by Sgr A*.

In 2026, S301 was reported as the closest and fastest securely observed star orbiting Sgr A*. It approaches to about 12 AU from the black hole and reaches approximately 8.5% of the speed of light at pericentre. The previous record holder was S4714.

== List of stars ==
The inferred orbits of stars around the supermassive black hole Sagittarius A* at the Milky Way's center are according to Gillessen et al. 2017, with the exception of S2 which is from GRAVITY 2019, and S4711 up to S4715, which are also from Peißker et al., Aug 2020. Data for S62, reported in Peißker et al. Jan 2020, was later found to be further than expected from Sagittarius A* and is now thought to be due to a mistaken observation of S29. Data for S301 are from Abd El Dayem et al. (2026); because its radial velocity has not yet been measured, two possible orbital orientations remain, and the first solution reported in the study is used here.

Here id1 is the star's name in the Gillessen catalog and id2 in the catalog of the University of California, Los Angeles. a, e, i, Ω and ω are standard orbital elements, with a measured in arcseconds. Tp is the epoch of pericenter passage, P is the orbital period in years and Kmag is the K-band apparent magnitude of the star. q and v are the pericenter distance in AU and pericenter speed in percent of the speed of light, and Δ indicates the standard deviation of the associated quantities.

Binary Star system D9 was recently found in the S Cluster.

id1	id2	Other name	Spectral class	Mass (Solar masses)	Temperature (K)	a	Δa	e	Δe	i (°)	Δi	Ω (°)	ΔΩ	ω (°)	Δω	Tp (yr)	ΔTp	P (yr)	ΔP	Kmag	q (AU)	Δq	v (%c)	Δv	Radius (Solar radii)
S1	S0-1		B0-2 V			0.5950	0.0240	0.5560	0.0180	119.14	0.21	342.04	0.32	122.30	1.40	2001.800	0.150	166.0	5.8	14.70	2160.7	6.7	0.55	0.03	4.49
S2	S0-2		B0-2 V	14		0.1251	0.0001	0.8843	0.0001	133.91	0.05	228.07	0.04	66.25	0.04	2018.379	0.001	16.0518	0.0	13.95	118.4	0.2	2.56	0.00	6.36
S4	S0-3		B0-2 V			0.3570	0.0037	0.3905	0.0059	80.33	0.08	258.84	0.07	290.80	1.50	1957.400	1.200	77.0	1.0	14.40	1779.7	25.1	0.57	0.01	
S6	S0-7		B0-2 V			0.6574	0.0006	0.8400	0.0003	87.24	0.06	85.07	0.12	116.23	0.07	2108.610	0.030	192.0	0.2	15.40	860.3	4.4	0.94	0.00	4.53
S8	S0-4		B0-2 V			0.4047	0.0014	0.8031	0.0075	74.37	0.30	315.43	0.19	346.70	0.41	1983.640	0.240	92.9	0.4	14.50	651.7	22.5	1.07	0.01	4.47
S9	S0-5		B0-2 V			0.2724	0.0041	0.6440	0.0200	82.41	0.24	156.60	0.10	150.60	1.00	1976.710	0.920	51.3	0.7	15.10	793.2	36.9	0.93	0.02	
S10	S0-6	[CRG2004] 12	K5 III																	14.26					
S12	S0-19		B4-9 V			0.2987	0.0018	0.8883	0.0017	33.56	0.49	230.10	1.80	317.90	1.50	1995.590	0.040	58.9	0.2	15.50	272.9	2.0	1.69	0.01	
S13	S0-20		B4-9 V			0.2641	0.0016	0.4250	0.0023	24.70	0.48	74.50	1.70	245.20	2.40	2004.860	0.040	49.0	0.1	15.80	1242.0	2.4	0.69	0.01	
S14	S0-16		B4-9 V			0.2863	0.0036	0.9761	0.0037	100.59	0.87	226.38	0.64	334.59	0.87	2000.120	0.060	55.3	0.5	15.70	56.0	3.8	3.83	0.06	3.1789
S17			K0 III		5,000	0.3559	0.0096	0.3970	0.0110	96.83	0.11	191.62	0.21	326.00	1.90	1991.190	0.410	76.6	1.0	15.30	1755.3	16.4	0.57	0.02	9
S18	S0-18					0.2379	0.0015	0.4710	0.0120	110.67	0.18	49.11	0.18	349.46	0.66	1993.860	0.160	41.9	0.2	16.70	1029.3	3.8	0.77	0.01	
S19	S0-28		K-M			0.5200	0.0940	0.7500	0.0430	71.96	0.35	344.60	0.62	155.20	2.30	2005.390	0.160	135.0	14.0	16.00	1063.3	4.5	0.83	0.20	
S21						0.2190	0.0017	0.7640	0.0140	58.80	1.00	259.64	0.62	166.40	1.10	2027.400	0.170	37.0	0.3	16.90	422.7	3.6	1.32	0.02	
S22						1.3100	0.2800	0.4490	0.0880	105.76	0.95	291.70	1.40	95.00	20.00	1996.900	10.200	540.0	63.0	16.60	5903.7	9.7	0.32	0.10	
S23						0.2530	0.0120	0.5600	0.1400	48.00	7.10	249.00	13.00	39.00	6.70	2024.700	3.700	45.8	1.6	17.80	910.5	1.6	0.85	0.06	
S24	S0-26					0.9440	0.0480	0.8970	0.0049	103.67	0.42	7.93	0.37	290.00	15.00	2024.500	0.030	331.0	16.0	15.60	795.3	30.8	0.99	0.07	
S27	S0-27		K3 III																	15.74					
S29						0.4280	0.0190	0.7280	0.0520	105.80	1.70	161.96	0.80	346.50	5.90	2025.960	0.940	101.0	2.0	16.70	952.2	67.4	0.87	0.05	
S31	S0-8		B4-9 V			0.4490	0.0100	0.5497	0.0025	109.03	0.27	137.16	0.30	308.00	3.00	2018.070	0.140	108.0	1.2	15.70	1653.7	14.6	0.63	0.02	
S33	S0-33					0.6570	0.0260	0.6080	0.0640	60.50	2.50	100.10	5.50	303.70	1.60	1928.000	12.000	192.0	5.2	16.00	2106.5	179.7	0.56	0.03	
S38	S0-38		M III	5.9713	3,330	0.1416	0.0002	0.8201	0.0007	171.10	2.10	101.06	0.24	17.99	0.25	2003.190	0.010	19.2	0.0	17.00	208.4	1.5	1.91	0.01	185.84
S39						0.3700	0.0150	0.9236	0.0021	89.36	0.73	159.03	0.10	23.30	3.80	2000.060	0.060	81.1	1.5	16.80	231.2	3.3	1.86	0.09	
S42						0.9500	0.1800	0.5670	0.0830	67.16	0.66	196.14	0.75	35.80	3.20	2008.240	0.750	335.0	58.0	17.50	3364.4	24.8	0.44	0.13	
S54						1.2000	0.8700	0.8930	0.0780	62.20	1.40	288.35	0.70	140.80	2.30	2004.460	0.070	477.0	199.0	17.50	1050.2	1.9	0.86	0.78	
S55	S0-102		B0-2 V			0.1078	0.0010	0.7209	0.0077	150.10	2.20	325.50	4.00	331.50	3.90	2009.340	0.040	12.8	0.1	17.50	246.1	4.1	1.70	0.02	
S60						0.3877	0.0070	0.7179	0.0051	126.87	0.30	170.54	0.85	29.37	0.29	2023.890	0.090	87.1	1.4	16.30	894.5	1.7	0.89	0.02	
S66	S1-2	[RGH2007] GEN-0.06-1.01	O-B			1.5020	0.0950	0.1280	0.0430	128.50	1.60	92.30	3.20	134.00	17.00	1771.000	38.000	664.0	37.0	14.80	10712.4	620.5	0.21	0.02	
S67	S1-3		O-B			1.1260	0.0260	0.2930	0.0570	136.00	1.10	96.50	6.40	213.50	1.60	1705.000	22.000	431.0	10.0	12.10	6511.2	360.6	0.29	0.01	
S71	S0-71					0.9730	0.0400	0.8990	0.0130	74.00	1.30	35.16	0.86	337.80	4.90	1695.000	21.000	346.0	11.0	16.10	803.8	1.4	0.99	0.06	
S83	S0-15	[GEO97] W5	O9-9.5 V		33,000	1.4900	0.1900	0.3650	0.0750	127.20	1.40	87.70	1.20	203.60	6.00	2046.800	6.300	656.0	69.0	13.60	7738.6	22.5	0.27	0.05	7.5
S85			M0 III	9.178	3,800	4.6000	3.3000	0.7800	0.1500	84.78	0.29	107.36	0.43	156.30	6.80	1930.200	9.800	3580.0	2550.0	15.60	8277.1	29.6	0.30	0.33	51.008
S87	S1-12					2.7400	0.1600	0.2240	0.0270	119.54	0.87	106.32	0.99	336.10	7.70	611.000	154.000	1640.0	105.0	13.60	17390.5	2572.9	0.17	0.02	
S89						1.0810	0.0550	0.6390	0.0380	87.61	0.16	238.99	0.18	126.40	4.00	1783.000	26.000	406.0	27.0	15.30	3191.8	407.2	0.46	0.04	
S91						1.9170	0.0890	0.3030	0.0340	114.49	0.32	105.35	0.74	356.40	1.60	1108.000	69.000	958.0	50.0	12.20	10928.4	74.5	0.22	0.02	
S96	S0-96	GCIRS 16C	Ofpe/WN9			1.4990	0.0570	0.1740	0.0220	126.36	0.96	115.66	0.59	233.60	2.40	1646.000	16.000	662.0	29.0	10.00	10127.0	530.0	0.22	0.02	
S97 A	S1-16	GCIRS 16SW	Ofpe/WN9	50	24,400	2.3200	0.4600	0.3500	0.1100	113.00	1.30	113.20	1.40	28.00	14.00	2132.000	29.000	1270.0	309.0	10.30	12333.9	305.9	0.21	0.08	54.5 × 58.2 × 62.7
S97 B	S1-16	GCIRS 16SW	Ofpe/WN9	50	23,500	2.3200	0.4600	0.3500	0.1100	113.00	1.30	113.20	1.40	28.00	14.00	2132.000	29.000	1270.0	309.0	10.30	12333.9	305.9	0.21	0.08	54.5 × 58.2 × 62.7
S145			M III	5.1216	3,330	1.1200	0.1800	0.5000	0.2500	83.70	1.60	263.92	0.94	185.00	16.00	1808.000	58.000	426.0	71.0	17.50	4580.2	1471.2	0.37	0.10	179.46
S175						0.4140	0.0390	0.9867	0.0018	88.53	0.60	326.83	0.78	68.52	0.40	2009.510	0.010	96.2	5.0	17.50	45.0	0.8	4.27	0.47	
S301				1.1–1.5		0.0830	0.0007	0.9832	0.0010	124.09	1.10	73.8	3.5	293.4	2.2	2023.126	0.010	8.68	0.11	19.3	11.5		8.5		1.4–1.6
S4711			B8-9 V	2.2	11,587.84	0.0751	0.0015	0.768	0.030	114.71	2.92	20.10	3.72	131.59	3.09	2010.85	0.06	7.6	0.3	18.4	143.7	7.4	2.2	0.2	2.59
S4712			B9-A0 V	2.2	10,000	0.451	0.0025	0.365	0.032	117.28	1.31	166.38	3.20	238.08	3.43	2007.12	0.08	112.0	2.9	18.4	2366	120	0.48	0.02	
S4713				2.1		0.2	0.095	0.351	0.059	111.07	1.66	95.06	5.15	301.97	8.02	2000.03	0.22	33.2	2.5	18.5	1073	110	0.71	0.05	
S4714				2		0.102	0.0003	0.985	0.011	127.7	0.28	129.28	0.63	357.25	0.08	2017.29	0.02	12.0	0.3	17.7	12.6	9.3	8.0	3	
S4715			B9 V	2.8		0.1439	0.011	0.247	0.040	129.8	3.72	282.15	2.92	359.99	5.38	2008.05	0.3	20.2	2.4	17.8	894	83	0.75	0.04	2.37
S4716			B7-8 V		12,417.07	1.9300		0.756		161.24		151.54		0.073				4.0							2.45
R34						1.8100	0.1500	0.6410	0.0980	136.00	8.30	330.00	19.00	57.00	8.00	1522.000	52.000	877.0	83.0	14.00	5314.6	856.3	0.36	0.05	
R44						3.9000	1.4000	0.2700	0.2700	131.00	5.20	80.50	7.10	217.00	24.00	1963.000	85.000	2730.0	1350.0	14.00	23285.6	901.5	0.15	0.11	
id1	id2					a	Δa	e	Δe	i (°)	Δi	Ω (°)	ΔΩ	ω (°)	Δω	Tp (yr)	ΔTp	P (yr)	ΔP	Kmag	q (AU)	Δq	v (%c)	Δv	
