= Harry Clive Minnett =

Australian astronomer

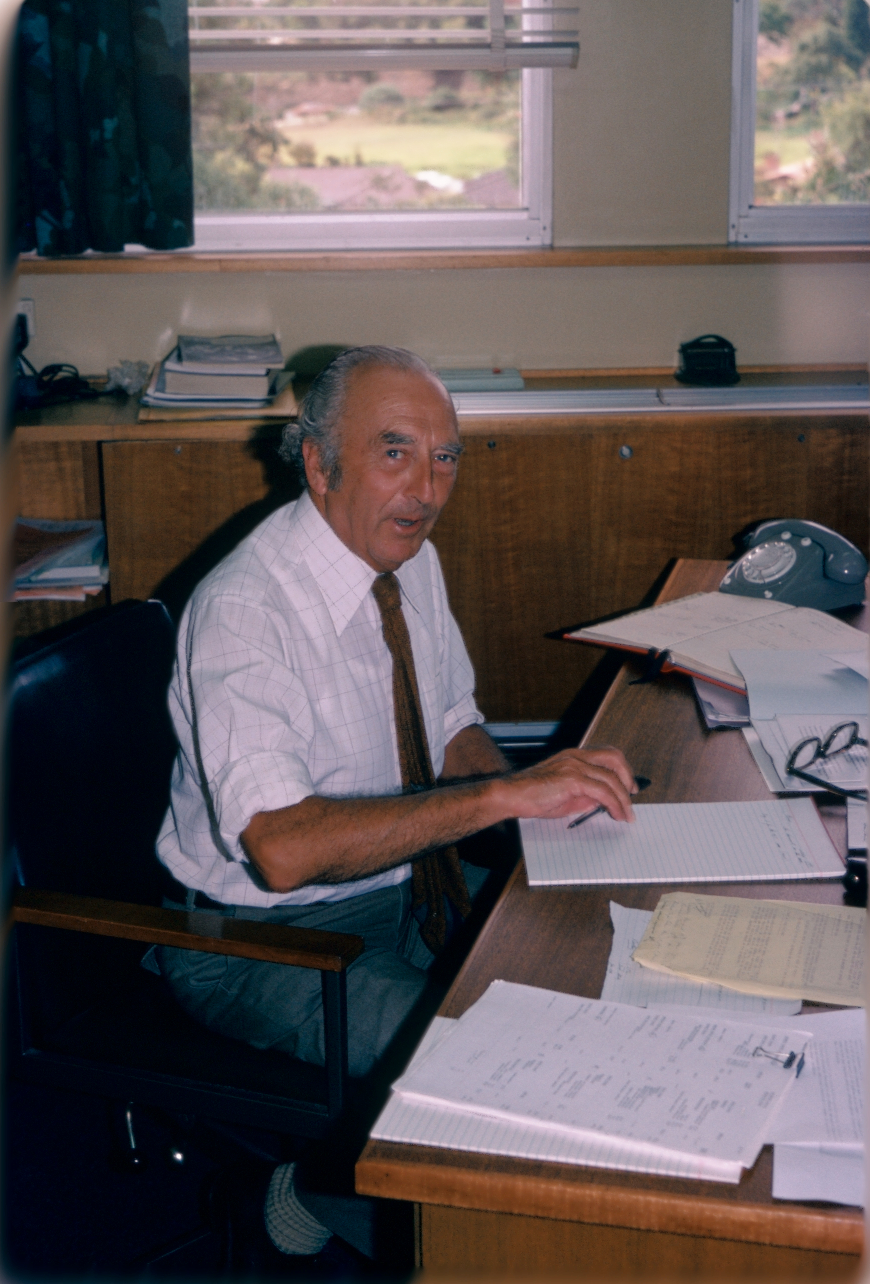
- Minnett, April 1981, at CSIRO Radiophysics, Sydney
- Born: 12 June 1917; Hurstville, New South Wales, Australia
- Died: 20 December 2003 (aged 86)
- Education: Sydney Boys High School; University of Sydney
- Known for: Radio astronomy
- Scientific career
- Fields: Physics; Radio astronomy
- Workplaces: CSIRO

Harry Clive Minnett OBE (12 June 1917 – 20 December 2003) was an Australian physicist and radio engineer who, with Jack Piddington, co-discovered Sagittarius A*, the black hole at the centre of the Milky Way, and played a leading role in building the Parkes Radio Telescope. Minnett was appointed Officer of the Order of the British Empire (OBE) in 1972, and elected a fellow of Australian Academy of Science in 1976.

== Early life and education ==
Harry Minnett was born in Hurstville, New South Wales on 12 June 1917, to parents Frederick Harry Brook Minnett and Elsie May Garnsey. He attended Hurstville Primary School, where he was dux of his final year in 1929, followed by Sydney Boys High School from 1930 to 1934. He then attended the University of Sydney, where he graduated with a Bachelor of Science (majoring in mathematics and physics) in 1939 and a Bachelor of Engineering with First Class Honours in 1940.

== Career ==
Minnett joined the CSIR (later the CSIRO) in 1940, as part of the Radiophysics Laboratory which pioneered radar technology in Australia, where he worked with and was mentored by Joseph Pawsey, Jack Piddington, and Taffy Bowen. He worked extensively on radar during WWII. In 1945 he travelled to the US, visiting the MIT Radiation Laboratory, Bell Laboratories, and the Naval Research Laboratory.

After the war he collaborated with Piddington on microwave-frequency radio astronomy, operating independently from Pawsey's research team who were using lower frequencies.

In 1956, Taffy Bowen made Minnett responsible for the design of the Parkes Radio Telescope.

In 1967, he began as a consultant on the design of the Anglo-Australian Telescope, becoming project manager in 1969.

In 1978, Minnett was appointed Chief of the Division of Radiophysics at the CSIRO, a position he held until his retirement three years later.
