= S55 (star) =

Star orbiting close to the supermassive black hole in the center of the Milky Way

Observation data Epoch J2000 Equinox ICRS
- Constellation: Sagittarius
- Right ascension: 17^{h} 45^{m} 40.0409^{s}
- Declination: −29° 0′ 28.118″

Characteristics

Astrometry
| Distance | 26,674±42 ly (8,178±13 pc) |

Orbit
| Name | Sagittarius A* |
| Period (P) | 12.8±0.1 yr |
| Semi-major axis (a) | 0.1078±0.0010″ |
| Eccentricity (e) | 0.721±0.008 |
| Inclination (i) | 150±2° |
| Longitude of the node (Ω) | 325±4° |
| Periastron epoch (T) | 2009.34±0.04 |
| Argument of periastron (ω) (secondary) | 332±4° |

Other designations
- [GKM98] S0–102.

Database references
| SIMBAD | data |

S55 (also known as S0–102) is a star that is located very close to the centre of the Milky Way, near the radio source Sagittarius A*, orbiting it with an orbital period of 12.8 years. This beat the record of 16 years previously set by S2. The star was identified by a University of California, Los Angeles team headed by Andrea M. Ghez. At its periapsis, its speed reaches 1.7% of the speed of light. At that point it is 246 astronomical units (34 light hours, 36.7 billion km) from the centre, while the black hole radius is only a small fraction of that size (the Schwarzschild radius is about 0.082 au). It passed that point in 2022 and will be there again in 2034.

In 2019 the star S62 was believed to have surpassed S55 to become be the new record holder, but further scrutiny found this star was much further from Sagittarius A* than believed, and earlier observations were consistent with star S29 instead. In 2020, further observation discovered several stars in the Sagittarius A* cluster with shorter orbital periods than S55.

Its position in the sky has been monitored from 2000 to 2012 using the W. M. Keck telescope and from 2002 to 2016 with the VLT. One complete orbit has been observed. From Earth's current perspective, it travels in a clockwise direction. Having observed two stars orbiting through complete periods around the centre (S55 and S2), the gravitational potential of Sgr A* could be established. It is also possible that there is a great deal of dark matter around the orbits of these stars. Also general relativistic effects due to gravitational redshift should become observable.

== See also ==
- S301
