= D9 (star) =

Binary star system

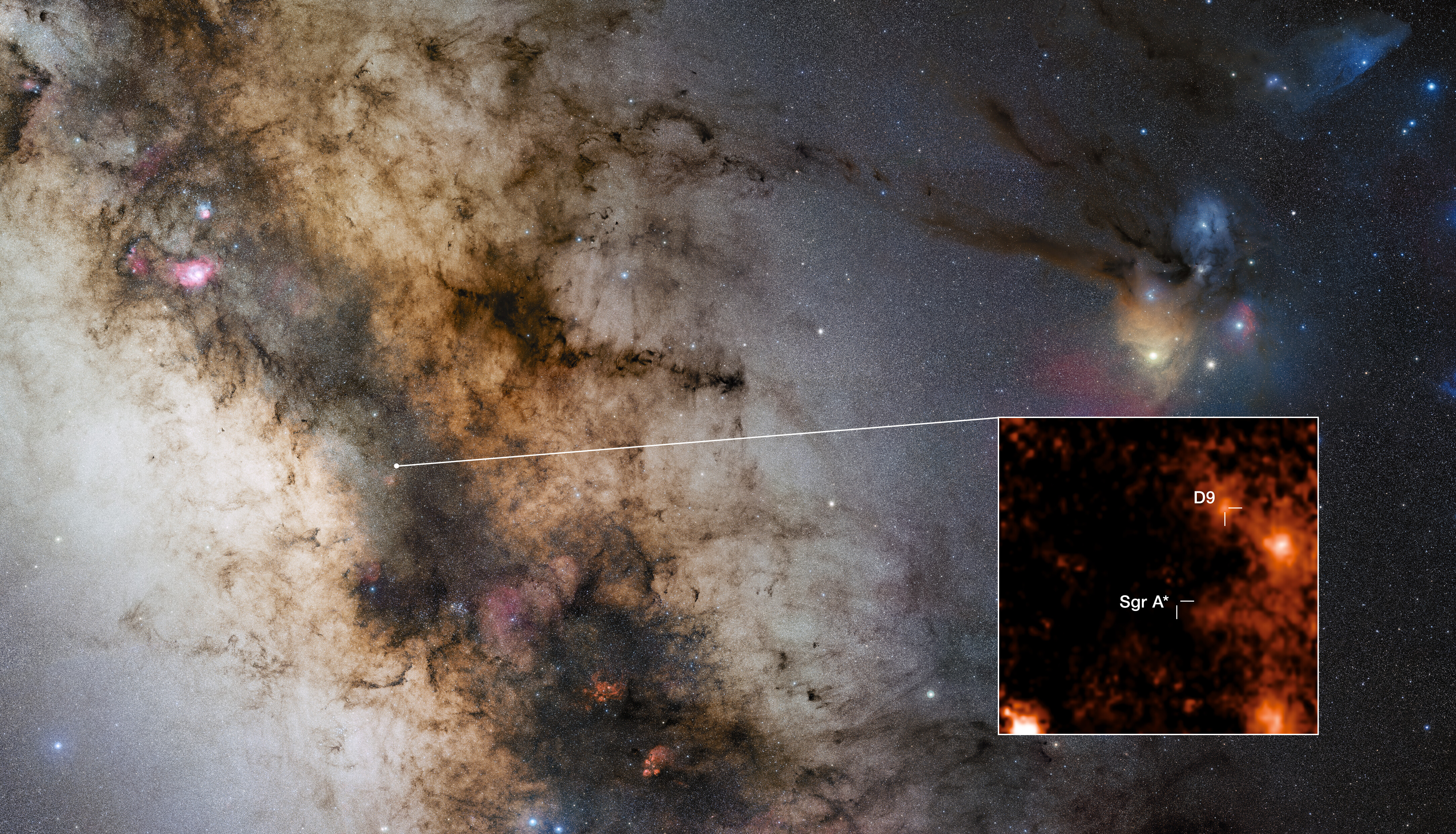
- Location of D9 Binary System near Sagittarius A* Black hole

Observation data Epoch J2000.0 Equinox ICRS
- Constellation: Sagittarius
- Right ascension: 17^{h} 45^{m} 40.0^{s}
- Declination: −29° 00′ 28″

Characteristics
- Evolutionary stage: Herbig Ae/Be + T Tauri

Astrometry
| Distance | 26,000 ly |

Orbit
| Primary | Sgr A* |
| Name | D9 |
| Period (P) | 432.62±0.01 yr |
| Semi-major axis (a) | 0.04400±0.00242 pc |
| Eccentricity (e) | 0.32±0.01 |
| Inclination (i) | 102.6±2.3° |
| Longitude of the node (Ω) | 257.25±1.61° |
| Argument of periastron (ω) (secondary) | 127.19±7.50° |

Orbit
| Primary | D9a |
| Name | D9b |
| Period (P) | 1.02±0.01 yr |
| Semi-major axis (a) | 1.59±0.01 AU |
| Eccentricity (e) | 0.45±0.01 |
| Inclination (i) | 75±19 or ~90° |
| Argument of periastron (ω) (secondary) | 311.75±1.65° |

Details

D9a
| Mass | 2.8±0.5 M_{☉} |
| Radius | 2.00±0.13 R_{☉} |
| Luminosity | 72+28 −20 L_{☉} |
| Temperature | 11,700+1,500 −1,200 K |
| Age | 2.7+1.9 −0.3 Myr |

D9b
| Mass | 0.73±0.14 M_{☉} |
| Age | 2.7+1.9 −0.3 Myr |

D9 is a binary star system located in the S Cluster, a dense group of stars orbiting Sagittarius A* (Sgr A*), the supermassive black hole at the center of Milky Way Galaxy. D9 is located approximately 26,000 light-years from Earth. It is the first confirmed binary star system observed in close proximity to our supermassive black hole.

== Discovery and Characteristics ==
The D9 system was identified by an international team led by Florian Peißker from the European Southern Observatory (ESO). The discovery utilized over 15 years of spectroscopic data collected by ESO’s Very Large Telescope (VLT) in Chile, primarily through the ERIS and SINFONI instruments. Velocity variations in the system’s infrared light confirmed its binary nature, distinguishing it from a single star.

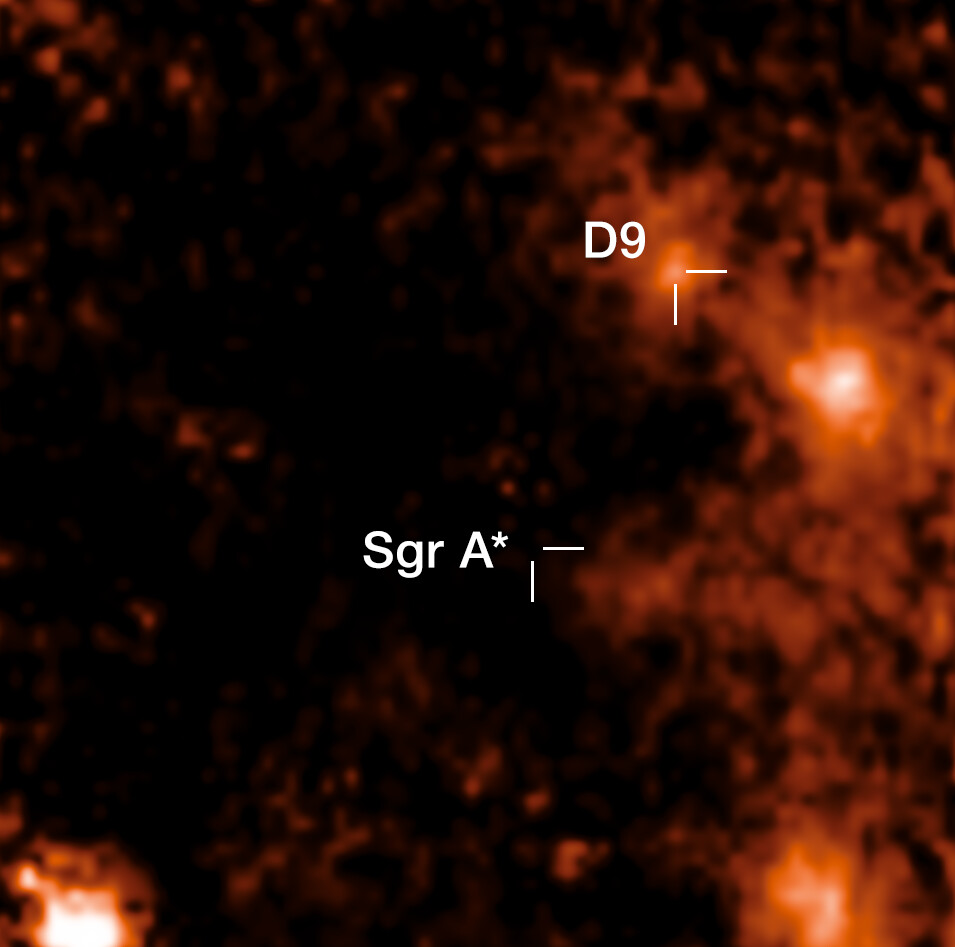
Image of D9 Binary close to Sagittarius A* Black Hole

=== Orbital Dynamics ===
The two stars in D9 are gravitationally bound, but the intense tidal forces from Sgr A* are expected to disrupt their orbit, likely causing a merger into a single star within approximately one million years. This short-lived binary phase provides a rare opportunity to study such systems in extreme conditions.

Future observations using instruments like the VLT’s GRAVITY+ or the Extremely Large Telescope (ELT)'s METIS expected to further explore the system.
