= Daryl Haggard =

American astronomer

- Born: Seattle, Washington, United States
- Education: St. John's College (BA 1995); San Francisco State University (M.Sc. 2004); University of Washington (PhD 2010)
- Known for: Multi-messenger astronomy
- Awards: CIFAR Azrieli Global Scholar (2017– 2019)
- Scientific career
- Fields: Astronomy
- Workplaces: Northwestern University; Amherst College; McGill University
- Thesis: The Fraction of X-ray-active Galaxies in the Field from the Chandra Multiwavelength Project and the Sloan Digital Sky Survey (2010)
- Doctoral advisor: Scott F. Anderson; Paul J. Green
- Website: https://www.dhaggard.physics.mcgill.ca/

Daryl Haggard is an American-Canadian astronomer and associate professor in the Department of Physics at McGill University and the McGill Space Institute.

== Early life and education ==
Haggard was born in Seattle, Washington, the fifth of eight children, and moved to Santa Fe, New Mexico at 6 months of age. Haggard's father was a mathematician and college professor. Her mother trained as biologist and owns a native plant nursery in Santa Fe.

She studied at St. John's College, earning a bachelor's degree in philosophy and mathematics in May 1995. She became fascinated by orbital mechanics after reading Newton's Principia and realizing that mathematical equations could describe the orbits of planets.

In 2004, Haggard received her master's degree in physics from San Francisco State University, where she studied X-ray-emitting binary stars in the globular cluster Omega Centauri. She obtained a Ph.D. in astronomy from the University of Washington in 2010. Her thesis work focused on active galactic nuclei (accreting supermassive black holes at the center of distant galaxies).

== Career ==
After completing her Ph.D., Haggard accepted a postdoctoral fellowship at the Center for Interdisciplinary Exploration and Research in Astrophysics (CIERA) at Northwestern University, Illinois. She spent one year as an assistant professor of astronomy in the Department of Physics and Astronomy at Amherst College, Massachusetts, before accepting an assistant professorship at McGill University in Montreal and joining the newly formed McGill Space Institute in 2015.

Daryl Haggard's research group uses radio, submillimeter, near infrared, and X-ray telescopes to study compact objects, including active galactic nuclei, Sagittarius A* (the supermassive black hole at the center of the Milky Way galaxy) and the mergers of neutron stars.

In 2017, she led a team that used the Chandra X-ray Observatory to detect the afterglow of the merger of two neutron stars, GW170817, the first detection of X-rays from a gravitational wave source. Follow-up observations of the merger remnant by Haggard's group in 2017 showed the remnant grew brighter, rather than dimming, as expected. The remnant finally began to fade in X-ray observations taken in 2018, 260 days after the merger.

She is currently a member of the Canadian Joint Committee on Space Astronomy, the Event Horizon Telescope Multiwavelength Coordination Team and the Thirty Meter Telescope International Science Development Team. Haggard had also served on the American Astronomical Society (AAS) Governance Task Force, was the editor of the AASWOMEN Newsletter and was elected a member of the AAS High Energy Astrophysics Division (HEAD) Executive Committee.

== Awards and recognition ==
CIFAR Azrieli Global Scholar (2017–19)

Kavli Frontiers Fellow (2014–2016)

CIERA Postdoctoral Fellow (2010–2014)

== Personal life ==
Haggard resides in Montreal with her husband Nicolas Benjamin Cowan, an astronomer and planetary scientist. They have one son.

== Selected publications ==
- Haggard, Daryl; Nynka, Melania; Ruan, John J.; Kalogera, Vicky; Cenko, S. Bradley; Evans, Phil; Kennea, Jamie A. (2017-10-16). "A Deep Chandra X-Ray Study of Neutron Star Coalescence GW170817". The Astrophysical Journal. 848 (2): L25. arXiv:1710.05852. Bibcode:2017ApJ...848L..25H. doi:10.3847/2041-8213/aa8ede. ISSN 2041-8213. S2CID 55424196.
- Abbott, B. P.; Abbott, R.; Abbott, T. D.; Acernese, F.; Ackley, K.; Adams, C.; Adams, T.; Addesso, P.; Adhikari, R. X. (2017-10-16). "Multi-messenger Observations of a Binary Neutron Star Merger". The Astrophysical Journal. 848 (2): L12. arXiv:1710.05833. Bibcode:2017ApJ...848L..12A. doi:10.3847/2041-8213/aa91c9. ISSN 2041-8213. S2CID 217162243.
- Capellupo, Daniel M.; Haggard, Daryl; Choux, Nicolas; Baganoff, Fred; Bower, Geoffrey C.; Cotton, Bill; Nathalie Degenaar; Dexter, Jason; Falcke, Heino (2017). "Simultaneous Monitoring of X-Ray and Radio Variability in Sagittarius A*". The Astrophysical Journal. 845 (1): 35. arXiv:1707.01937. Bibcode:2017ApJ...845...35C. doi:10.3847/1538-4357/aa7da6. ISSN 0004-637X. S2CID 46989757.
- Ponti, G.; George, E.; Scaringi, S.; Zhang, S.; Jin, C.; Dexter, J.; Terrier, R.; Clavel, M.; Degenaar, N. (2017-03-10). "A powerful flare from Sgr A* confirms the synchrotron nature of the X-ray emission". Monthly Notices of the Royal Astronomical Society. 468 (2): 2447–2468. arXiv:1703.03410. Bibcode:2017MNRAS.468.2447P. doi:10.1093/mnras/stx596. ISSN 0035-8711. S2CID 3184660.
- Haggard, Daryl; Heinke, Craig; Hooper, Dan; Linden, Tim (2017). "Low mass X-ray binaries in the Inner Galaxy: implications for millisecond pulsars and the GeV excess". Journal of Cosmology and Astroparticle Physics. 2017 (5): 056. arXiv:1701.02726. Bibcode:2017JCAP...05..056H. doi:10.1088/1475-7516/2017/05/056. ISSN 1475-7516. S2CID 119462034.
- Capellupo, Daniel M.; Wafflard-Fernandez, Gaylor; Haggard, Daryl (2017). "A Comparison of Two Methods for Estimating Black Hole Spin in Active Galactic Nuclei". The Astrophysical Journal Letters. 836 (1): L8. arXiv:1701.07887. Bibcode:2017ApJ...836L...8C. doi:10.3847/2041-8213/aa5cac. ISSN 2041-8205. S2CID 119506360.
