= GCIRS 16SW =

Binary star in the Galactic Center in the constellation Sagittarius

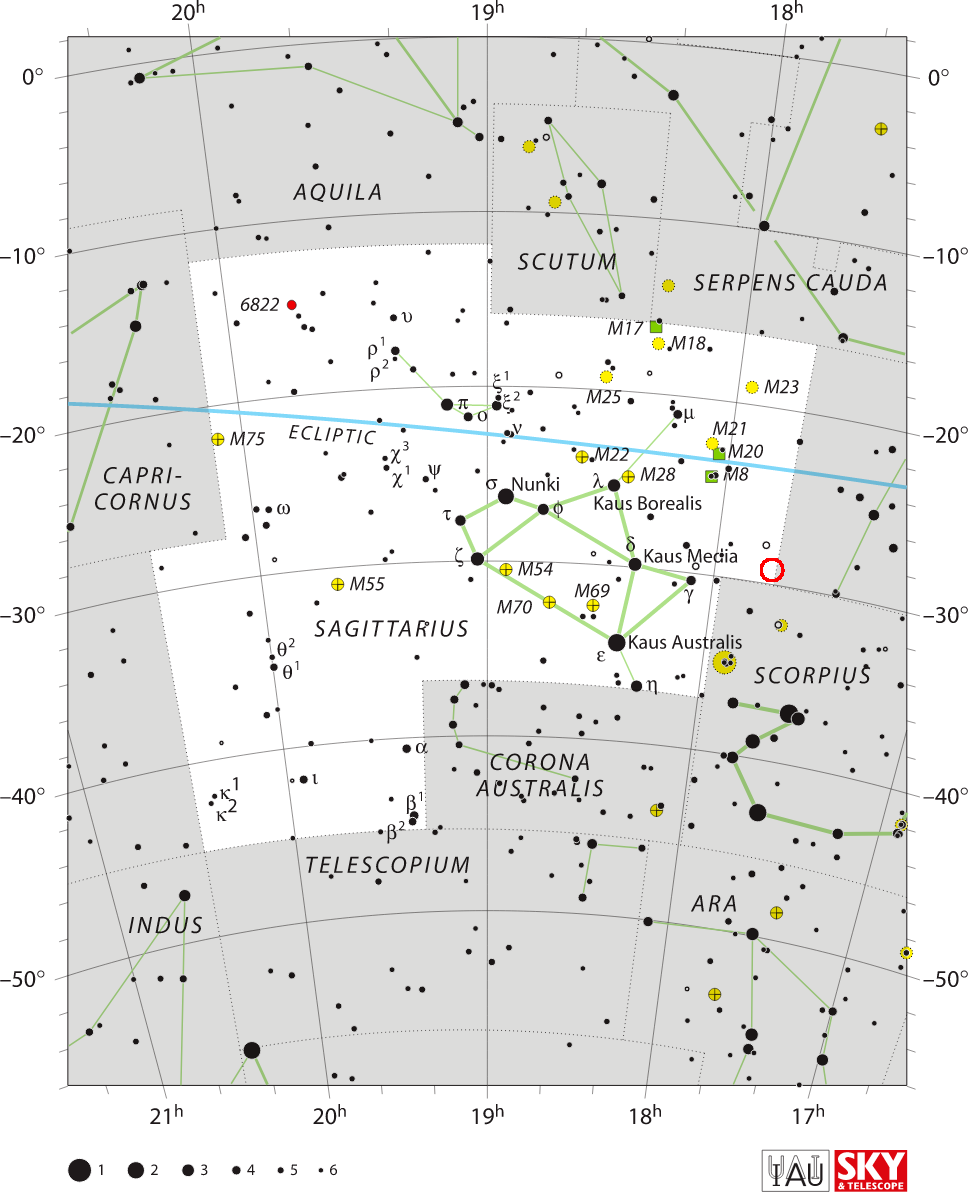
- The location of GCIRS 16SW (circled in red)

Observation data Epoch J2000 Equinox ICRS
- Constellation: Sagittarius
- Right ascension: 17^{h} 45^{m} 40.124^{s}
- Declination: −29° 00′ 29.02″

Characteristics
- Evolutionary stage: Slash star
- Spectral type: Ofpe/WN9
- Apparent magnitude (J): 14.75
- Apparent magnitude (H): 11.6
- Apparent magnitude (K): 9.34

Orbit
Primary	Sagittarius A*
Name	GCIRS 16SW
Period (P)	1270±309 yr
Semi-major axis (a)	2.32±0.46″
Eccentricity (e)	0.35±0.11
Inclination (i)	113.0±1.3°
Longitude of the node (Ω)	113.2±1.4°
Periastron epoch (T)	2132±29
Argument of periastron (ω) (secondary)	28±14°

Orbit
Period (P)	19.4513±0.0011 d
Semi-major axis (a)	140.6±4.7 R_{☉}
Inclination (i)	70.85±0.6°
Periastron epoch (T)	2451775.102±0.032

Details

A
Mass	~50 M_{☉}
Radius	54.5±1.8 × 58.2±1.9 × 62.7±2.1 R_{☉}
Luminosity	1,100,000 L_{☉}
Surface gravity (log g)	3.0 cgs
Temperature	24,400 K

B
Mass	~50 M_{☉}
Radius	54.5±1.8 × 58.2±1.9 × 62.7±2.1 R_{☉}
Luminosity	1,100,000 L_{☉}
Surface gravity (log g)	3.0 cgs
Temperature	23,500 K

Other designations
- GCIRS 16SW, IRS 16SW, S97, S1-16

Database references
SIMBAD	data

GCIRS 16SW, also known as S97, is a contact binary star located in the Galactic Center. It is composed of two hot massive stars of equal size that orbit each other with a period of 19.5 days. The stars are so close that their atmospheres overlap, and the two stars form an eclipsing binary varying in brightness by 0.35 magnitudes at infrared wavelengths.

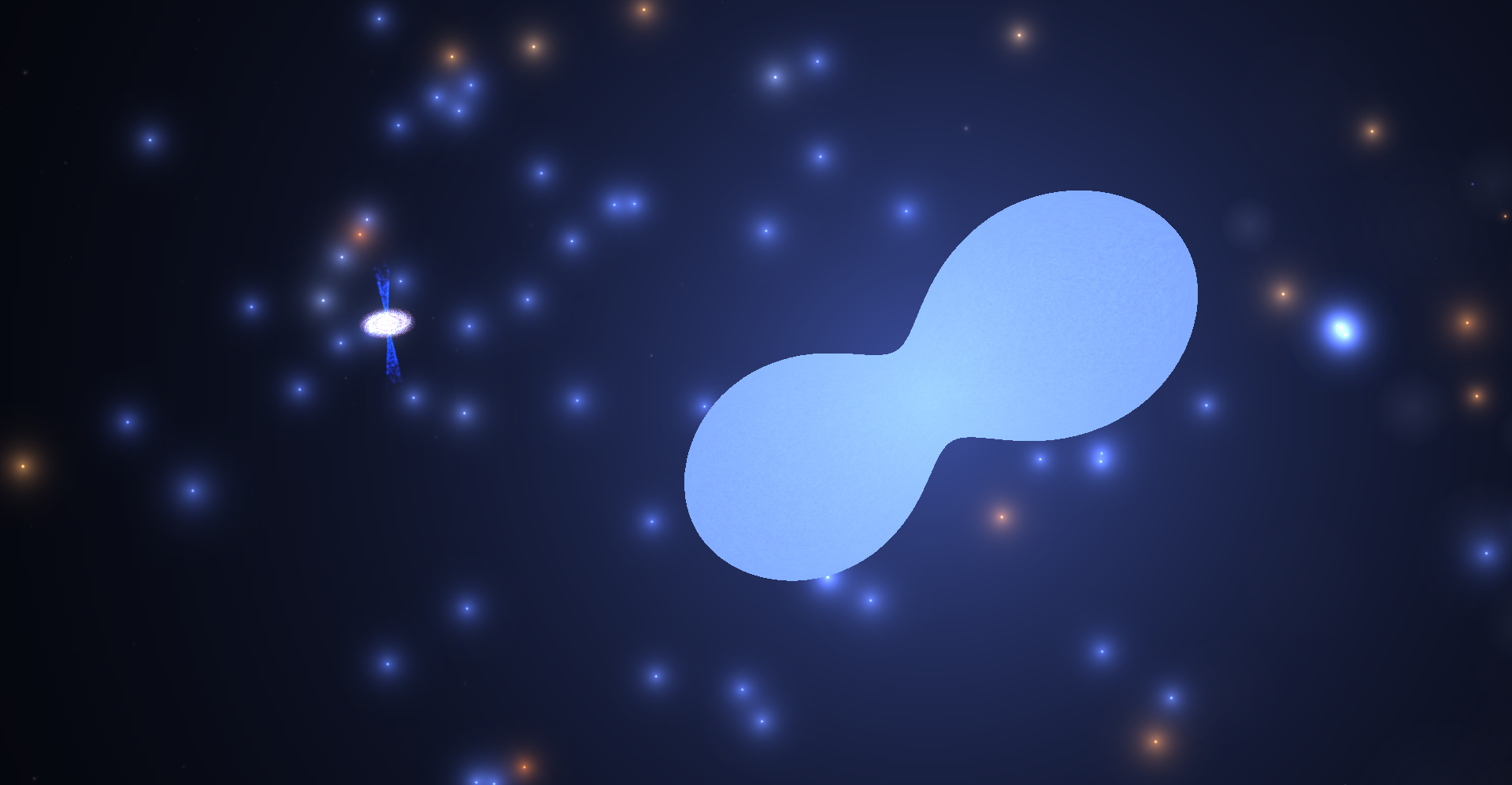
Artist's impression of GCIRS 16SW

GCIRS 16SW orbits Sagittarius A* at approximately 19,000 AU, with a period of approximately 1,270 years. At the stars' estimated mass of about 50 solar masses, they are predicted to have a lifespan of about 4 million years, indicating that the system formed within 0.1 parsecs (0.33 ly; 21,000 AU) of Sagittarius A*, instead of having migrated inward from a greater distance.

GCIRS 16SW was classified as a candidate luminous blue variable on the basis of its spectrum and physical properties. This was before it was identified as an eclipsing binary, but it is still treated as a candidate LBV.

Each star is strongly distorted by the gravity of the other star. The polar radius is calculated to be 54.5 R_{☉}, while the radius along the direction of orbital motion is 58.2 R_{☉}. The radius along the line joining the two stars is 62.7 R_{☉}, while the separation of the centres of the two stars is 132.8 R_{☉}. A calculation of properties treating the binary as a single star gave an effective temperature of 24,400 K. The secondary component is found to have a temperature 96% of that of the primary. However, these temperatures yield a luminosity over a million times that of the sun, uncomfortably close to the Eddington luminosity for each star, and it is suspected the actual temperatures are slightly lower.

The stellar wind of IRS 16SW may be the origin of three gas clouds in the galactic center called G1, G2 and G3.
