= S62 (star) =

Star orbiting close to the supermassive black hole in the center of the Milky Way

Observation data Epoch J2000 Equinox J2000
- Constellation: Sagittarius
- Right ascension: 17^{h} 45^{m} 40.036^{s}
- Declination: −29° 00′ 28.17″

Details
Mass	6.1 M_{☉}

Database references
SIMBAD	data

S62 is a star in the cluster surrounding Sagittarius A* (Sgr A*), the supermassive black hole in the center of the Milky Way. S62 was initially thought to orbit extremely close to Sgr A*, with a period of 9.9 years and a closest approach of only 16 astronomical units (2.4×10^{9} km), less than the distance between Uranus and the Sun. This would have put it at just 215 times the Schwarzschild radius of Sgr A* (the Schwarzschild radius of Sgr A* is approximately 0.082 AU, or 12 million km).

However, later observations with the GRAVITY instrument of the Very Large Telescope observed S62 to be in an inconsistent position compared to the prediction from the original observations. The star was observed to be moving linearly, with no detected acceleration, indicating that it was not as close to the black hole as it appeared in the projection. The original, mistaken orbital reconstruction is consistent with an observation of the star S29 having been mistaken for S62.
