= Jack Piddington =

Australian research physicist & radio scientist (1910–1997)

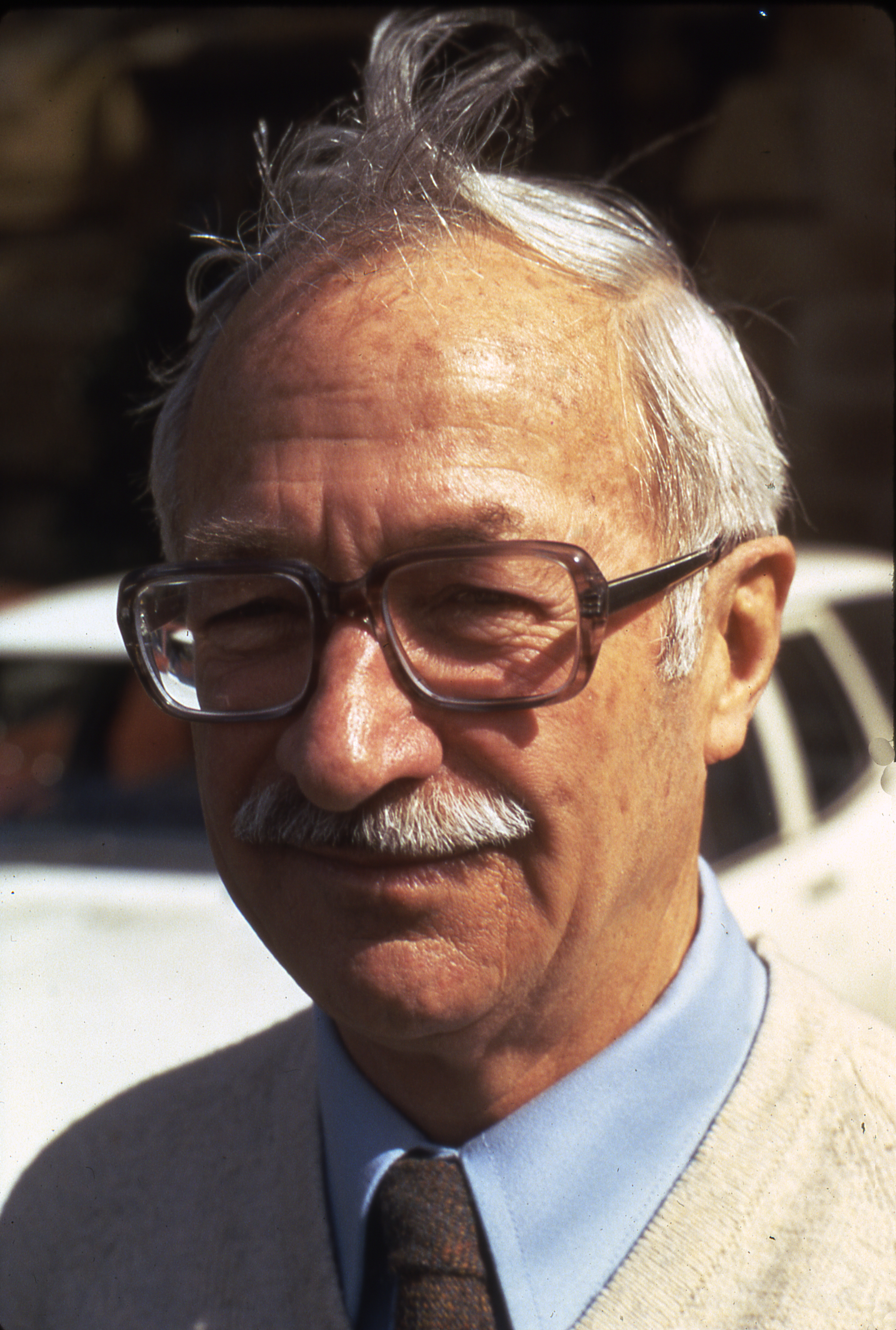
Piddington in 1973

Jack Hobart Piddington (6 November 1910 – 16 July 1997) was an Australian research physicist and radio scientist. He was chief research scientist at the National Measurement Laboratory in Sydney, Australia from 1966 to 1975.

Piddington was born at Wagga Wagga in 1910. William Henry Piddington and Albert Piddington were elder brothers of his grandfather Frederick Hobart Piddington, and Ralph Piddington was a son of Albert Piddington. He received his tertiary education at the University of Sydney, from where he graduated with a B.Sc. in 1932, B.E. in 1934, and M.Sc. in 1936. He obtained his Ph.D. in 1938 from the University of Cambridge. He was awarded the David Syme Research Prize in 1958. He was awarded the T. K. Sidey Medal in 1959, an award set up by the Royal Society of New Zealand for outstanding scientific research. He was elected a fellow of the Australian Academy of Science in 1963.
