= GRAVITY (Very Large Telescope) =

GRAVITY is an instrument on the Very Large Telescope

VLTI GRAVITY

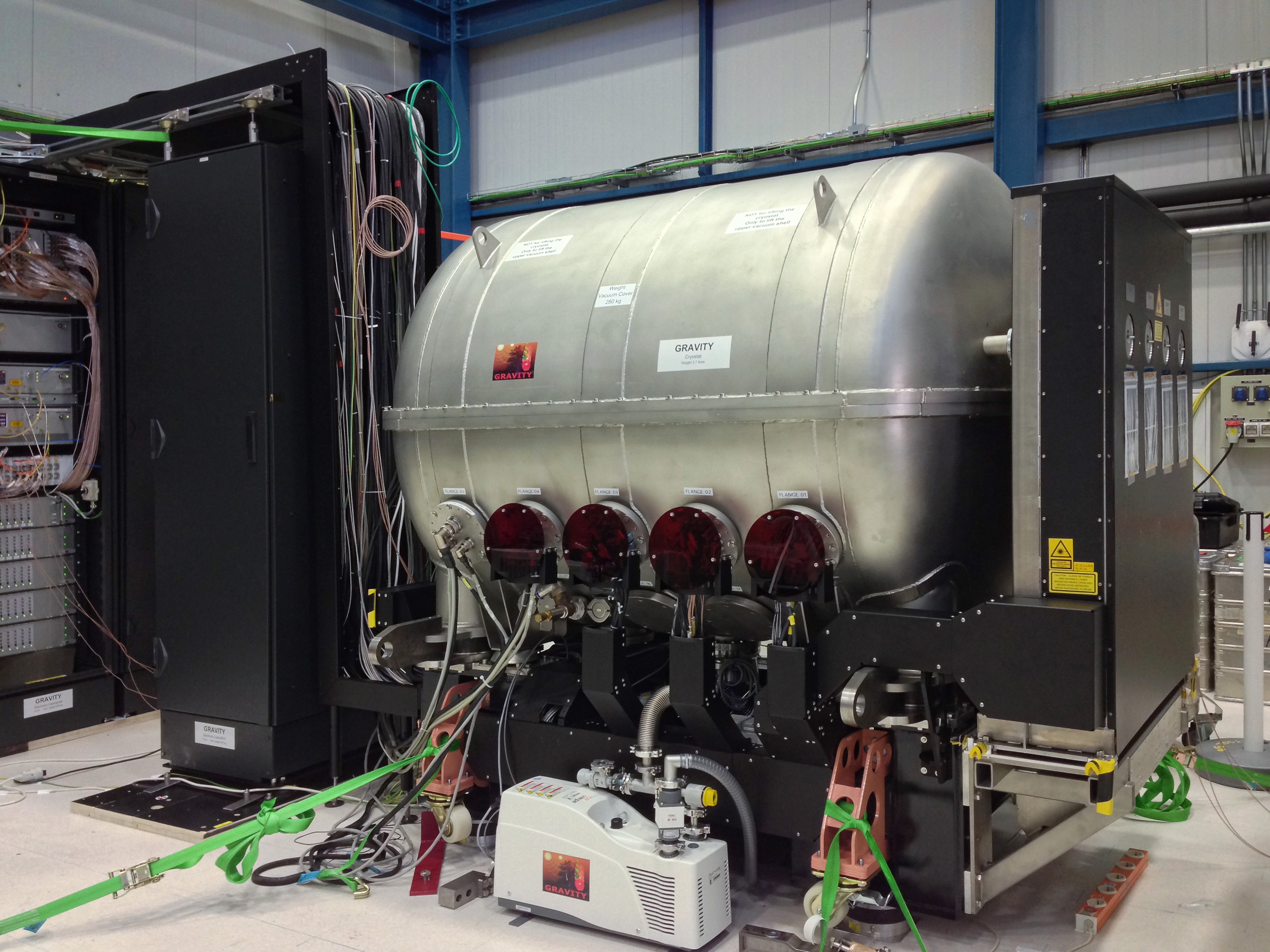
Beam Combining Instrument (BCI), which is the main part of GRAVITY from the outside

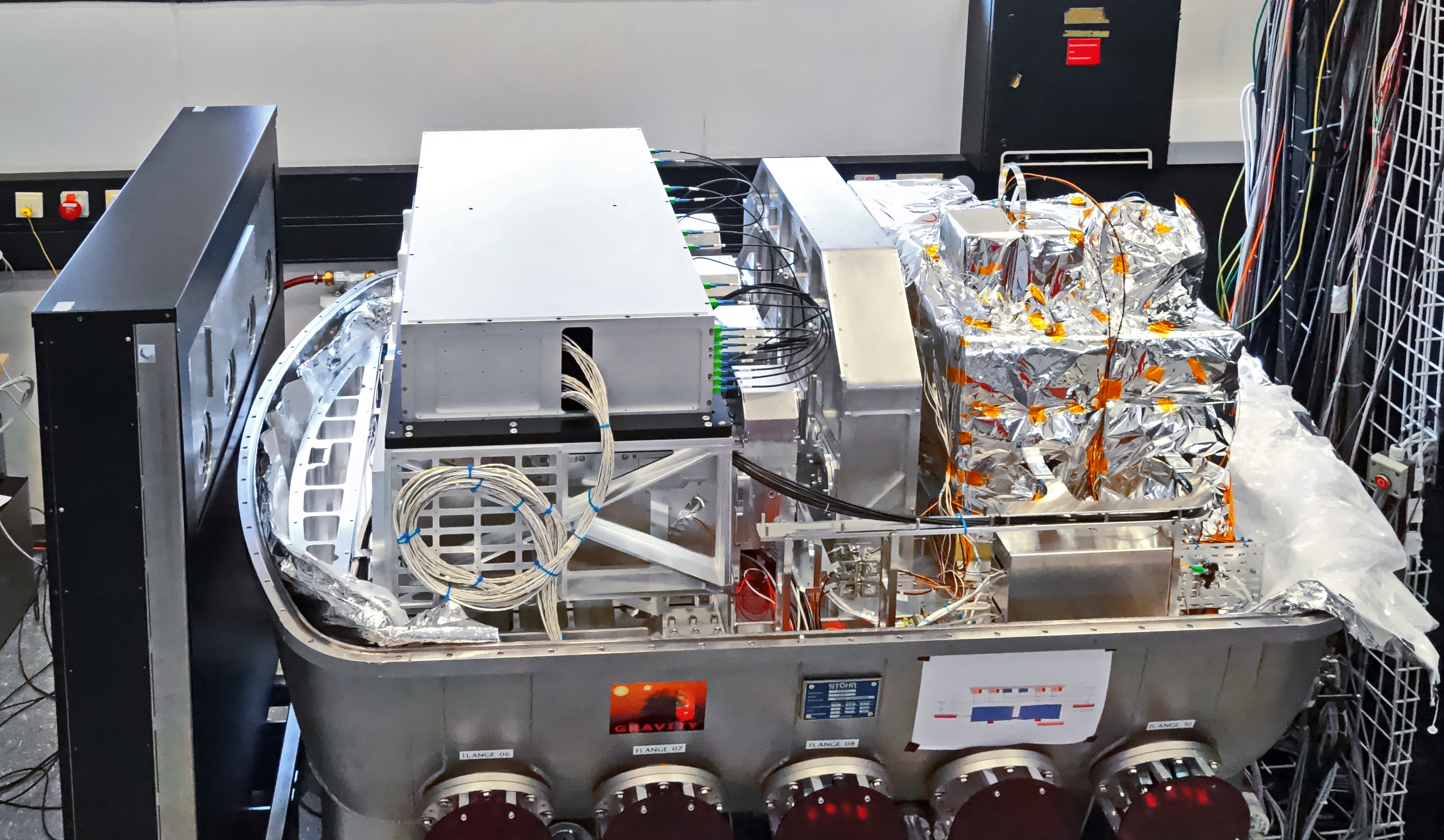
BCI with the cover removed

GRAVITY is an instrument on the interferometer of the Very Large Telescope (VLTI). It either combines the light of the four Unit Telescopes (UT) or the smaller four Auxiliary Telescopes. The instrument works with adaptive optics and provides a resolution of 4 milliarcseconds (mas) and can measure the position of astronomical objects down to a few 10 microarcseconds (μas). VLTI GRAVITY has a collecting area of 200 m^{2} and the angular resolution of a 130 m telescope.

== Instrument details ==
GRAVITY was built by a consortium led by the Max Planck Institute for Extraterrestrial Physics. Other partner institutes are from France, Germany, Portugal and the European Southern Observatory. The first light images included the discovery that Theta1 Orionis F in the Trapezium Cluster is a binary.

GRAVITY can operate in single-field mode or in dual-field mode. In the dual-field mode it can interfere two astronomical objects at the same time and acquire this way very accurate astrometry. The instrument data can also be used for K-band spectroscopy with three spectral resolutions. GRAVITY has the following sub-components:

- IR wavefront sensing system CIAO (located at the Unit Telescopes) that will work with the MACAO deformable mirror
- A polarisation control system to counteract polarisation effects in the VLTI
- An active pupil guide system including LED sources mounted on each of the telescope secondary mirror support (spiders)
- A field-guide system to track the position of the source
- The Beam Combining Instrument (BCI)

The Beam Combining Instrument is the primary unit of GRAVITY. It performs acquisition and provides interferometric fringes. BCI is cryogenically cooled and located in the VLT-I laboratory.

== Science ==
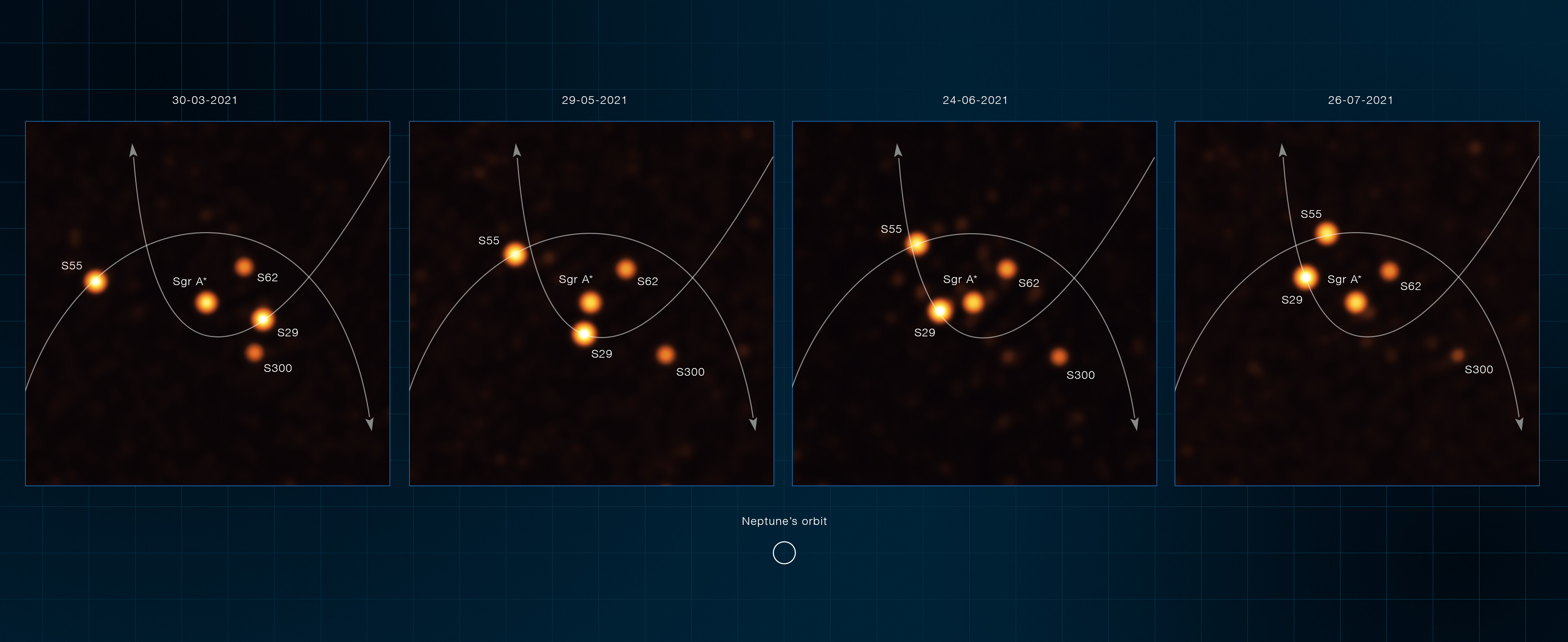
Orbit of stars at the center of the Milky Way imaged with GRAVITY

GRAVITY is mainly used to observe the stars orbiting the supermassive black hole Sagittarius A* and the position of exoplanets and brown dwarfs around their host star. It is also used for other studies that require a high resolution, such as the study of circumstellar disks and the study of AGNs.

== GRAVITY+ ==
Test of a new laser during the GRAVITY+ upgrade. The upgrade equipped all Unit Telescopes with lasers. Previously only one UT had lasers.

GRAVITY+ is the upgrade of GRAVITY, which will increase its sensitivity and increase its sky coverage. The upgrade is performed incrementally to reduce the disruption of astronomical observations. GRAVITY+ or Gravity Plus Adaptive Optics (GPAO) had first light at the end of 2024, by using natural guide stars (NGS) to observe targets. Part of the upgrade was the equipment of all four Unit Telescopes with AO systems. The observations included a sub-microarcsecond differential astrometry of β Pictoris, which showed that the stellar rotation axis is aligned with the warped inner disk and not with the outer disk.
