= S2 (star) =

Star orbiting close to Sagittarius A*

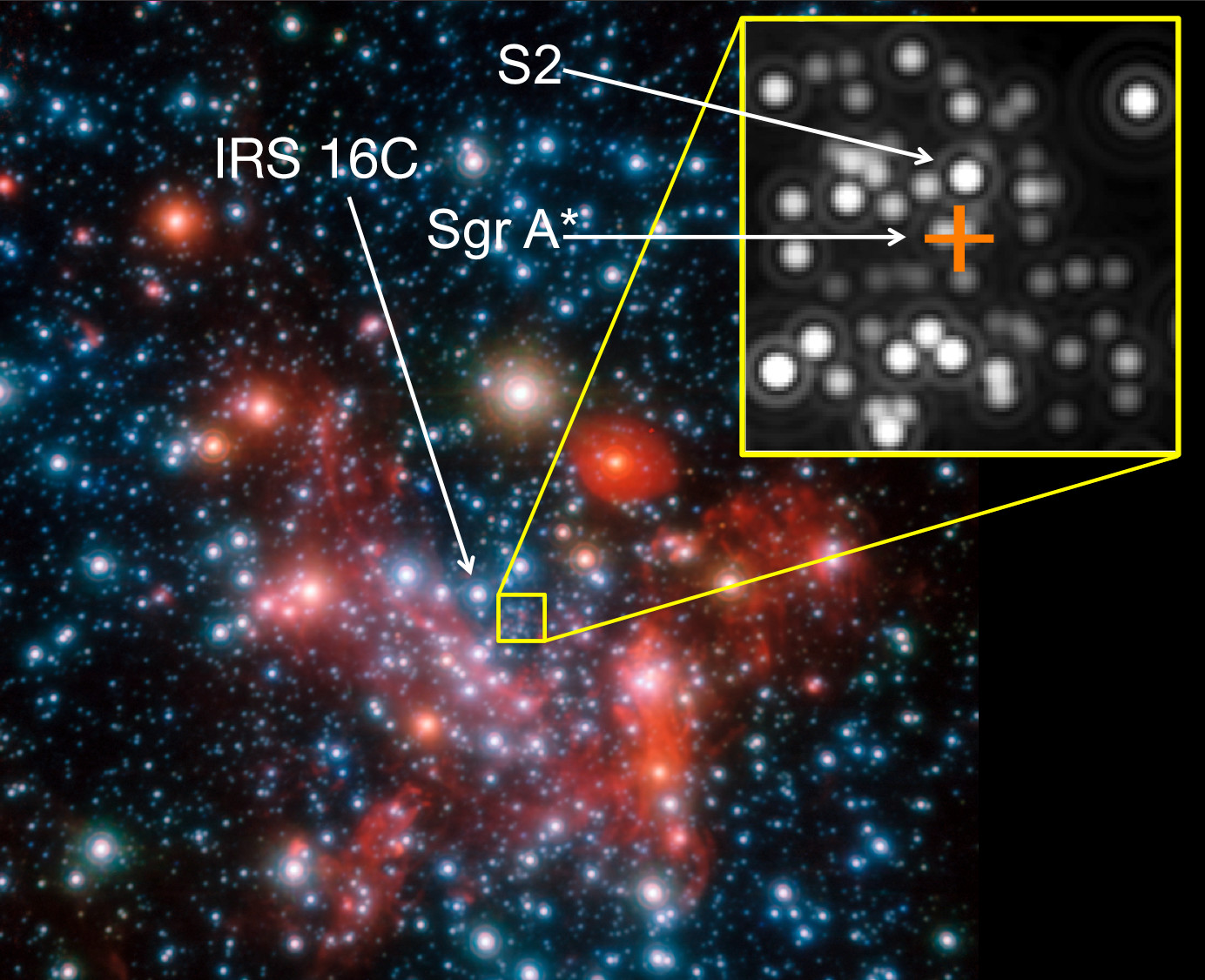
- Image of the Galactic Center showing the position of S2; Credit: ESO / MPE / Gillessen et al.

Observation data Epoch J2000.0 Equinox ICRS
- Constellation: Sagittarius
- Right ascension: 17^{h} 45^{m} 40.0442^{s}
- Declination: −29° 00′ 27.975″

Characteristics
- Evolutionary stage: main sequence
- Spectral type: B0–2 V

Astrometry
Distance	7,940±420 pc

Orbit
Name	Sagittarius A*
Period (P)	16.0518 yr
Semi-major axis (a)	0.12540±0.00018″
Eccentricity (e)	0.88466±0.00018
Inclination (i)	133.818±0.093°
Longitude of the node (Ω)	227.85±0.19°
Periastron epoch (T)	2018.37974±0.00015
Argument of periastron (ω) (secondary)	66.13±0.12°

Other designations
- E1, S2, S0–2

Database references
SIMBAD	data

S2, also known as S0–2, is a star in the star cluster close to the supermassive black hole Sagittarius A* (Sgr A*), orbiting it with a period of 16.0518 years, a semi-major axis of about 970 AU, and a pericenter distance of 17 light hours (18 Tm or 120 AU) – an orbit with a period only about 30% longer than that of Jupiter around the Sun, but coming no closer than about four times the distance of Neptune from the Sun. The mass when the star first formed is estimated by the European Southern Observatory (ESO) to have been approximately 14 M_{☉}.

Its changing apparent position has been monitored since 1995 by two groups (at UCLA and at the Max Planck Institute for Extraterrestrial Physics) as part of the effort to gather the evidence for the existence of a supermassive black hole in the center of the Milky Way galaxy. By 2008, S2 had been observed for one complete orbit. In 2020, partway through its next orbit, the GRAVITY collaboration released an analysis of the orbit of S2 showing full agreement with Schwarzschild geodesics.

A team of astronomers, mainly from the Max Planck Institute for Extraterrestrial Physics, used observations of S2's orbital dynamics around Sgr A* to measure the distance from the Earth to the Galactic Center. They determined it to be 7.94±0.42 kiloparsecs, in close agreement with prior determinations by other methods.

S2 was precisely tracked during its May 2018 close approach to Sgr A*, with results in accord with general relativity predictions.

== Nomenclature ==
The designation S0–2 was first used in 1998. S0 indicates a star within one arc-second of Sgr A*, indicating the galactic centre, and S0–2 was the second closest star seen at the time of the measurements. The star had been catalogued simply as S2 a year earlier, the second of eleven infrared sources near the galactic centre, numbered approximately anti-clockwise. It is a coincidence that the star is numbered "2" in both lists; other catalogues number it differently.

== Orbit ==
The highly eccentric orbit of S2 gives astronomers an opportunity to test for various effects predicted by general relativity and even extra-dimensional effects. These effects reach a maximum at closest approach (peribothron), which last occurred in mid-2018. Given a recent estimate of 4.31 million M_{☉} for the mass of the Sgr A* black hole and S2's close approach, this makes S2's the fastest known ballistic orbit, reaching speeds exceeding 5,000 km/s (11,000,000 mph, or 1/60 the speed of light).

The motion of S2 is also useful for detecting the presence of other objects near to Sgr A*. It is believed that there are thousands of stars, as well as dark stellar remnants (stellar black holes, neutron stars, white dwarfs) distributed in the volume through which S2 moves. These objects will perturb S2's orbit, causing it to deviate gradually from the Keplerian ellipse that characterizes motion around a single point mass. So far, the strongest constraint that can be placed on these remnants is that their total mass comprises less than one percent of the mass of the supermassive black hole.

=== 2018 pericentre passage ===
In 2018, S2 made its closest approach to Sgr A*, reaching 7,650 km/s or almost 3% of the speed of light, while passing the black hole at a distance of just 120 AU or about 1,400 times its Schwarzschild radius. S2 reached its pericenter on May 19, 2018, while its velocity in the line of sight from Earth peaked in April, and later hit its minimum in late August and early September.

Independent analyses by the GRAVITY collaboration (led by Reinhard Genzel) and the KECK/UCLA Galactic Center Group (led by Andrea Ghez) revealed a combined transverse Doppler and gravitational redshift up to 200 km/s/c, in agreement with general relativity predictions.

Additional analysis has revealed a Schwarzschild precession of 12 arcminutes (0.2 degrees) in S2's orbit caused by the close passage, fully consistent with general relativity.

== S0–102 ==
In 2012, a star called S0–102 (or S55) was found to be orbiting even closer to the Milky Way's central supermassive black hole than S0–2 does. At one-sixteenth the brightness of S0–2, S0–102 was not initially recognized because it required many more years of observations to distinguish it from its local infrared background. S0–102 has an orbital period of 12.8 years, even shorter than that of S0–2. Of all the stars orbiting the black hole, only these two have their orbital parameters and trajectories fully known in all three dimensions of space. The discovery of two stars orbiting the central black hole so closely with their orbits fully described is of extreme interest to astronomers, as the pair together will allow much more precise measurements on the nature of gravity and general relativity around the black hole than would be possible from using S0–2 alone.

== Image gallery ==
Artist's annotation of S2 passing Sagittarius A* (note: black hole is not to scale) at center of Milky Way, confirming gravitational red shift

Orbits of S0–2 and S0–102 around the Milky Way galaxy's supermassive black hole

Inferred orbits of S2 and five other stars around supermassive black hole candidate Sgr A* at the Milky Way Galactic Center

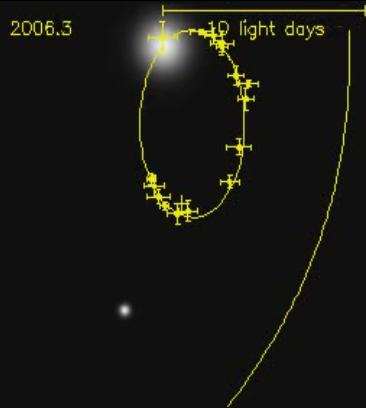
Observations showing the discovery of the orbit of S2 about the Galactic Center

== See also ==
- Lists of stars
