= Central Molecular Zone =

Region in the Milky Way with lots of gas and giant molecular clouds

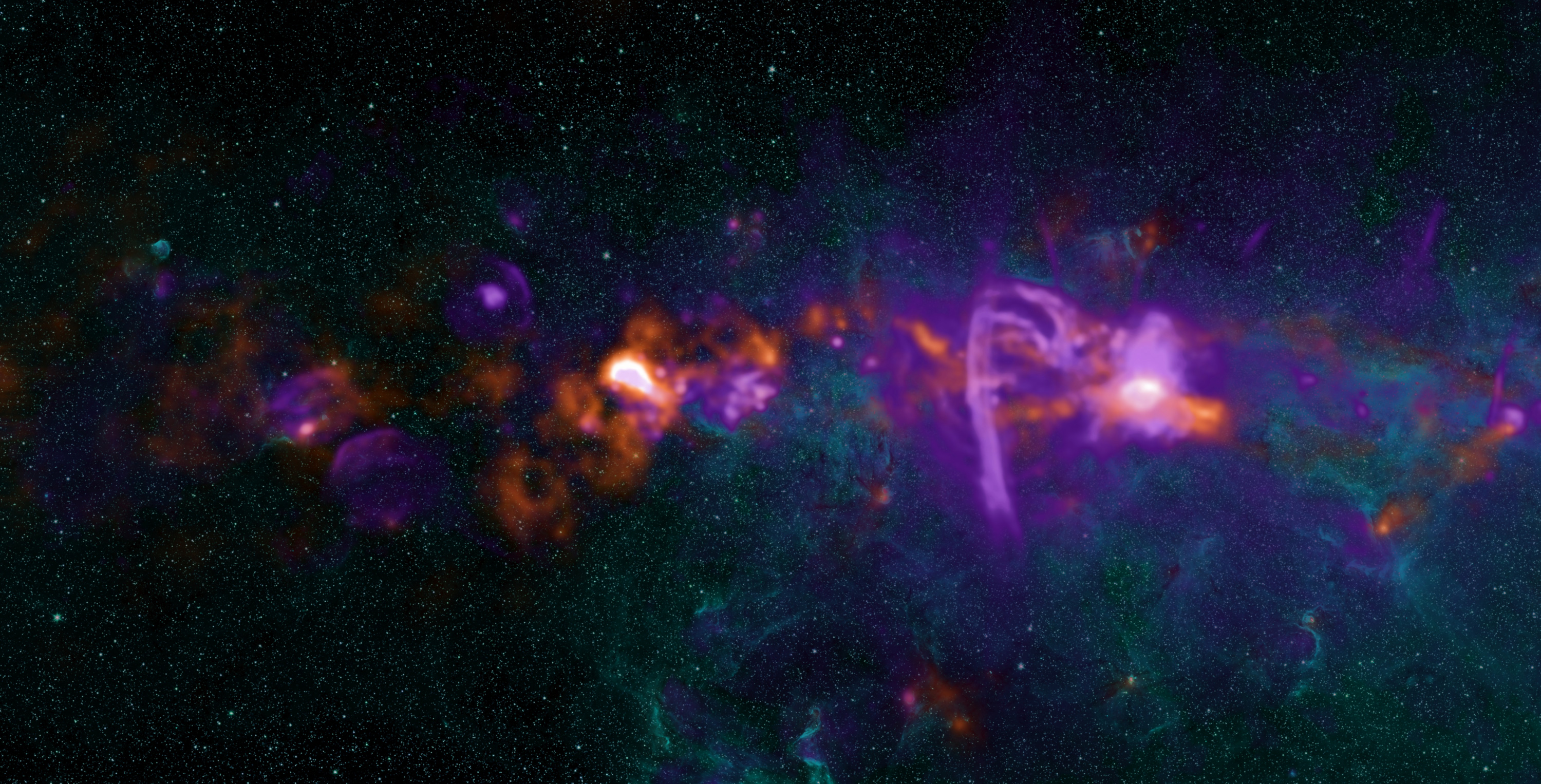
The Galactic center and the surrounding Central Molecular Zone. Molecular Hydrogen gas is shown here as purple while cold dust associated gas is orange. Cyan is primarily star emissions, point sources and polycyclic aromatic hydrocarbons (PAHs)

The Central Molecular Zone or CMZ is a region of the Milky Way Galaxy rich in an estimated 60 million solar masses (M_{☉}) of gas within a complex of giant molecular clouds. It spans the centre of the Milky Way, and as such is in the constellation Sagittarius, between galactic longitude 1.7° and −0.7°, and latitudes −0.2° and +0.2°.

The CMZ differs considerably from other large volumes of the Milky Way in terms of gas density, temperature, and turbulence. Its molecular gas density is several orders of magnitude greater than the galactic disk. Its gas temperature typically ranges from 50 to 100 kelvin but, particularly near the Galactic Center, can be as high as 400 to 600 K. Sampling of spectral line widths within the CMZ are in the 15 to 50 km/s range, compared to 1 to 10 km/s for giant molecular clouds in the galactic disk. Additionally, compared to the galactic disk, the CMZ produces a higher flux of cosmic rays and also emits copious ultraviolet and X-ray radiation.

The CMZ is asymmetrical with a diameter varying from approximately 1600 to 1900 light-years. Its highest gas surface densities are found east of the Milky Way's dynamical center at positive latitudes and velocities. Estimates of CMZ mass distribution indicate it has three times more mass present in its positive galactic latitudes compared to its negative latitudes. Additional to its internal asymmetry, the CMZ's orbital plane may be tilted approximately 5° with respect to the galactic plane at large.

The CMZ contains the Galactic Center Radio Arc, various supernova remnants, and emission nebulae. Regions with concentrations of gas are titled Sgr D HII, Sgr D SNR, SNR 0.9+0.1, Sgr B1, Sgr B2, SNR 0.3+0.0, Sgr A, SNR 359.1-00.5, SNR 359.0-00.9, Sgr C, Sgr E and also thread-like features called the Mouse, Snake, and Cane. Molecules found in the zone include carbon monoxide, methanol, isocyanic acid, hydrogen cyanide and silicon monoxide. Concentrations of cold dust with diameters of approximately 0.1 to 0.65 light-years, which are likely progenitor cores of future star systems, number in at least the hundreds.
