= Galactic Center Radio Arc =

X-ray filament in the galactic center that has a strong curve

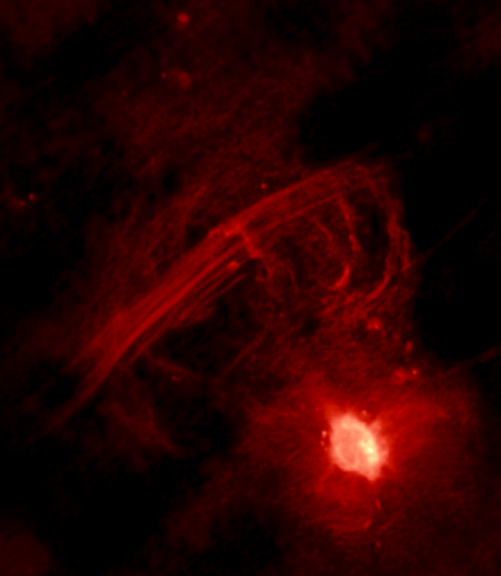
Image of the Galactic Center Radio Arc. The bright source near the bottom right is the supermassive black hole, Sagittarius A*at the center of the Milky Way galaxy.

The Galactic Center Radio Arc is a long curving X-ray filament about 40 light years across located in the Galactic Center of the Milky Way galaxy (about 8 kiloparsecs). The Central Molecular Zone (CMZ) also contains the Galactic central radio arc. The structure is curving towards the Galactic Center where the supermassive black hole called Sagittarius A* is located.

The curving is due to the hot plasma located inside the Galactic Center Radio Arc being directed and flowing along constant and strong magnetic field lines.
