= Sagittarius C =

Giant molecular cloud near the Milky Way's center

Molecular cloud
- Giant molecular cloud
- James Webb Space Telescope NIRCam image of star-formation in Sagittarius C.

Observation data: J2000.0 epoch
- Right ascension: 17^{h} 44^{m} 36.30^{s}
- Declination: −29° 28′ 13.0″
- Constellation: Sagittarius
- Designations: Sagittarius C, Sgr C

Sagittarius C (commonly abbreviated Sgr C) is a giant molecular cloud and star-forming region located in the Central Molecular Zone (CMZ) of the Milky Way galaxy's center. It is one of several prominent H II regions in the Galactic Center, alongside Sagittarius A, B1, Sagittarius B2, and D, and is notable for its dense gas, dust, and ongoing star formation under extreme environmental conditions. Situated approximately 200 light-years from the supermassive black hole Sagittarius A* (Sgr A*), Sgr C lies about 25,000 light-years from Earth in the direction of the constellation Sagittarius.

== Structure and composition ==
Sgr C spans approximately 50 light-years in extent, with detailed observations covering regions about 44 light-years across. It hosts an estimated 500,000 stars, including a significant population of young massive stars formed over the past 30 million years, totaling hundreds of thousands of solar masses. The region also includes an intermediate-age stellar population (2–7 billion years old), comprising about 50% of its stellar mass, which supports models of inside-out formation for the nuclear stellar disk.

== Observation and research ==
Early radio and infrared surveys identified Sgr C as a bright H II region. In 2023, the James Webb Space Telescope (JWST) using its Near-Infrared Camera (NIRCam) provided high-resolution infrared images, uncovering approximately 500,000 stars, hidden protostellar clusters, and intricate gas structures.

Subsequent studies in 2024–2025 integrated JWST data with observations from the Atacama Large Millimeter/submillimeter Array (ALMA) and the MeerKAT radio telescope, confirming massive star formation, magnetic influences, and protostellar outflows. Ongoing research focuses on the role of magnetism, hidden young stars, and the broader implications for galactic evolution.

== See also ==
- Sagittarius A
- Sagittarius B2
