= Sagittarius D =

Star-forming region in the constellation Sagittarius

Molecular cloud
- Giant molecular cloud

Observation data: J2000 epoch
- Right ascension: 17^{h} 48^{m} 41.75^{s}
- Declination: −28° 01′ 45.0″
- Constellation: Sagittarius
- Designations: GRS G001.05 -00.10, MGCS 001.05-00.1, MGCS 001.1-00.1, Sgr D, SNR G001.1-00.1

Sagittarius D (Sgr D) is an active star-forming region and radio source located 1° east of the galactic center. The radio source consists of two major components: SNR G1.05-0.15 (Sagittarius D SNR) and G1.13-0.10 (Sagittarius D H II region). Data suggests that Sagittarius D is situated beyond the galactic center.

Sagittarius D is composed of supernova remnants (SNRs) that fuel star formation and the creation of masers. Giant molecular clouds cover most of the region, containing dense molecular cores rich in star formation.

== Components ==
=== G1.13-0.10 ===
G1.13-0.10 (Sagittarius D H II region) is a star-forming region situated north of the Sagittarius D SNR, Observations show that the H II region is dominated by a single radio source, which is surrounded by a 7 arcminute diameter halo of ionized material. Analysis of the ionized material having very narrow line widths and high velocity broad-line absorption features confirm that the Sagittarius D lies beyond the galactic center. Observations on OH and H2O masers indicate at least three sites of recent or ongoing star formation within the Sagittarius D H II region. The H2O masers seem to reside in high-velocity molecular outflows.

=== SNR G1.05-0.15 ===
SNR G1.05-0.15 (Sagittarius D Supernova Remnant) is a non-thermal supernova remnant (SNR) located 5 arcminutes south of the Sagittarius D H II region. This remnant appears bright on the northern edge where it overlaps with the Sagittarius D H II region. A study found that it is the closest component to the sun based on absorption lines detected at -16 km s⁻¹. It has an estimated shell radius of 4 to 5 arcminutes. The core of the SNR is designated as G1.05-0.14, a H II region and molecular cloud core that interacts with the giant molecular cloud of Sagittarius D.

=== Other components ===
SNR G1.4-0.1 is a supernova remnant located 15 arcminutes northeast of the Sagittarius D H II region. The remnant is expanding into two molecular clouds. The supernova pushed its materials into the molecular clouds, producing. a rich maser environment. Observations detected over 40 class I methanol masers, hydroxyl masers, and ammonia emission clumps surrounding the SNR.

Using the Suzaku X-ray satellite, researchers identified an object north of the Sagittarius D H II region designated as G1.2-0.0. This object was first designated as a supernova remnant based on a thermal X-ray spectrum exhibiting highly ionized atoms and emission lines. Another observation later revealed strong low-frequency absorption and mid-infrared emission lines, reclassifying G1.2-0.0 as a H II region rather than a supernova remnant.
