= Silicon monoxide =

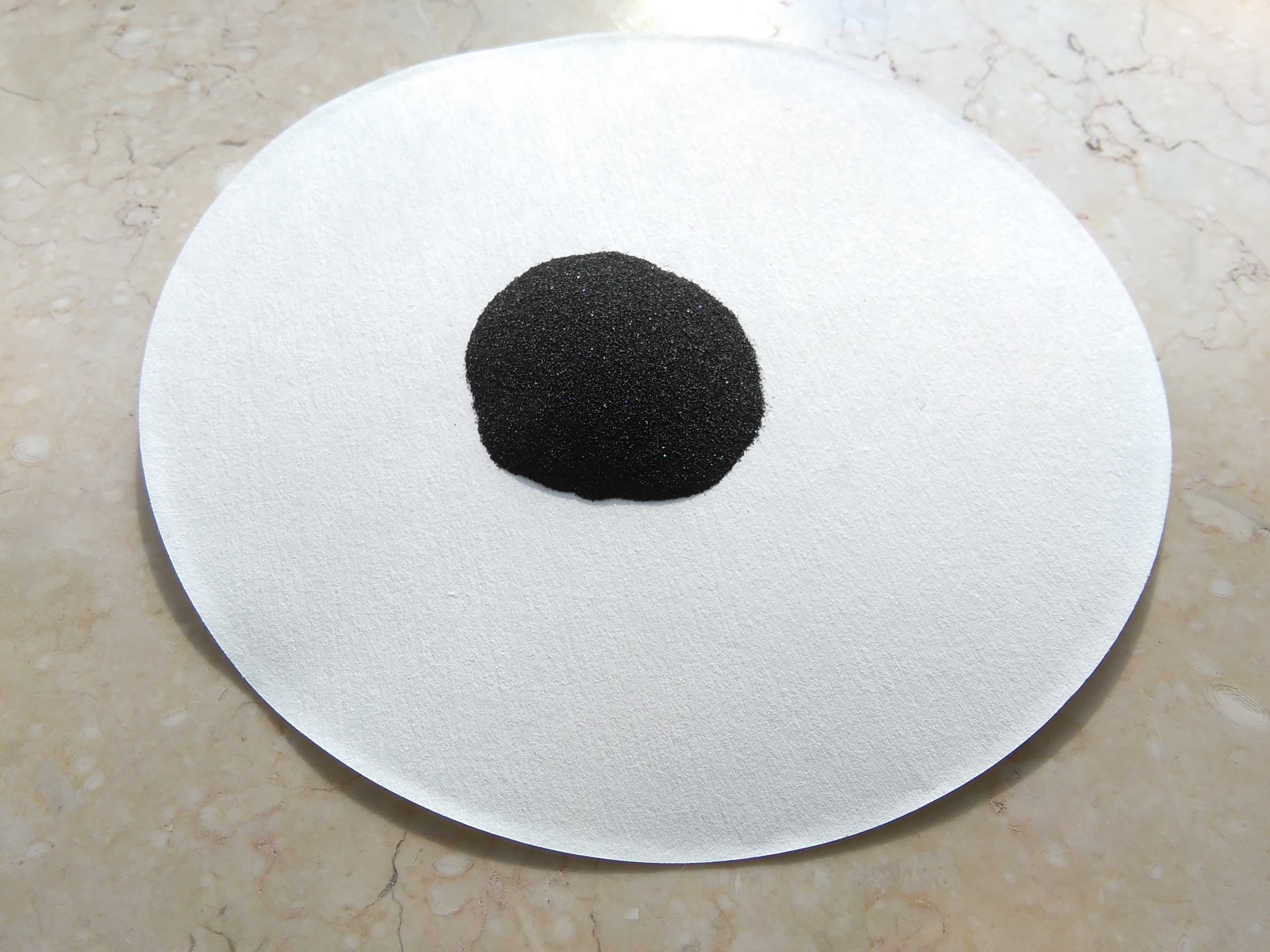

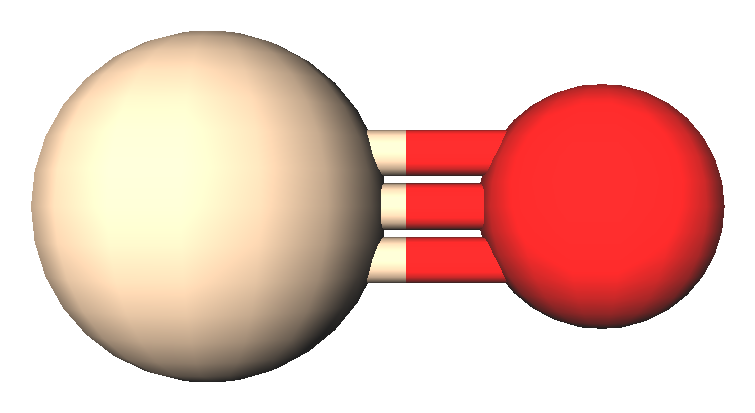

Names
- Preferred IUPAC name Silicon monoxide

Identifiers
CAS Number	10097-28-6
3D model (JSmol)	Interactive image
ChEBI	CHEBI:30588
ChemSpider	59626
ECHA InfoCard	100.030.198
EC Number	233-232-8
Gmelin Reference	382
MeSH	Silicon+monoxide
PubChem CID	66241
UNII	1OQN9CBG7L
CompTox Dashboard (EPA)	DTXSID7064940
- InChI: InChI=1S/H3OSi/c1-2/h2H3 Key: UXMAWJKSGBRJKV-UHFFFAOYSA-N; InChI=1/OSi/c1-2 Key: LIVNPJMFVYWSIS-UHFFFAOYAO; InChI=1S/OSi/c1-2 Key: LIVNPJMFVYWSIS-UHFFFAOYSA-N
- SMILES: [O+]#[Si-]

Properties
Chemical formula	SiO
Molar mass	44.08 g/mol
Appearance	brown-black glassy solid
Density	2.13 g/cm^{3}
Melting point	1,702 °C (3,096 °F; 1,975 K)
Boiling point	1,880 °C (3,420 °F; 2,150 K)
Solubility in water	insoluble

Hazards
- GHS labelling
Pictograms	(GHS07: Exclamation mark)
Signal word	Warning
Hazard statements	H315, H319, H335
Precautionary statements	P261, P264, P264+P265, P271, P280, P302+P352, P304+P340, P305+P351+P338, P319, P321, P332+P317, P337+P317, P362+P364, P403+P233, P405, P501
NFPA 704 (fire diamond)	1 0 0
Flash point	Non-flammable

Related compounds
Other anions	Silicon sulfide Silicon selenide Silicon telluride
Other cations	Carbon monoxide Germanium(II) oxide Tin(II) oxide Lead(II) oxide
Related silicon oxides	Silicon dioxide
- Except where otherwise noted, data are given for materials in their standard state (at 25 °C [77 °F], 100 kPa). verify (what is ?) Infobox references

Silicon monoxide is the chemical compound with the formula SiO where silicon is present in the oxidation state +2. In the vapour phase, it is a diatomic molecule. It has been detected in stellar objects and has been described as the most common oxide of silicon in the universe.

== Solid form ==
When SiO gas is cooled rapidly, it condenses to form a brown/black polymeric glassy material, (SiO)_{n}, which is available commercially and used to deposit films of SiO. Glassy (SiO)_{n} is air and moisture sensitive.

== Oxidation ==
Its surface readily oxidizes in air at room temperature, giving an SiO_{2} surface layer that protects the material from further oxidation. However, (SiO)_{n} irreversibly disproportionates into SiO_{2} and Si in a few hours between 400 °C and 800 °C and very rapidly between 1,000 °C and 1,440 °C, although the reaction does not go to completion.

== Production ==
The first precise report on the formation of SiO was in 1887 by the chemist Charles F. Maybery (1850–1927) at the Case School of Applied Science in Cleveland. Maybery claimed that SiO formed as an amorphous greenish-yellow substance with a vitreous luster when silica was reduced with charcoal in the absence of metals in an electric furnace. The substance was always found at the interface between the charcoal and silica particles.

By investigating some of the chemical properties of the substance, its specific gravity, and a combustion analysis, Maybery deduced that the substance must be SiO. The equation representing the partial chemical reduction of SiO_{2} with C can be represented as:

SiO_{2} + C ⇌ SiO + CO

Complete reduction of SiO_{2} with twice the amount of carbon yields elemental silicon and twice the amount of carbon monoxide. In 1890, the German chemist Clemens Winkler (the discoverer of germanium) was the first to attempt to synthesize SiO by heating silicon dioxide with silicon in a combustion furnace.

SiO_{2} + Si ⇌ 2 SiO

However, Winkler was not able to produce the monoxide since the temperature of the mixture was only around 1000 °C. The experiment was repeated in 1905 by Henry Noel Potter (1869–1942), a Westinghouse engineer. Using an electric furnace, Potter was able to attain a temperature of 1700 °C and observe the generation of SiO. Potter also investigated the properties and applications of the solid form of SiO.

=== Gaseous form ===
Because of the volatility of SiO, silica can be removed from ores or minerals by heating them with silicon to produce gaseous SiO in this manner. However, due to the difficulties associated with accurately measuring its vapor pressure, and because of the dependency on the specifics of the experimental design, various values have been reported in the literature for the vapor pressure of SiO (g). For the p_{SiO} above molten silicon in a quartz (SiO_{2}) crucible at the melting point of silicon, one study yielded a value of 0.002 atm. For the direct vaporization of pure, amorphous SiO solid, 0.001 atm has been reported. For a coating system, at the phase boundary between SiO_{2} and a silicide, 0.01 atm was reported.

Silica itself, or refractories containing SiO_{2}, can be reduced with H_{2} or CO at high temperatures, e.g.:

SiO_{2}(s) + H_{2}(g) ⇌ SiO(g) + H_{2}O(g)

As the SiO product volatilizes off (is removed), the equilibrium shifts to the right, resulting in the continued consumption of SiO_{2}. Based on the dependence of the rate of silica weight loss on the gas flow rate normal to the interface, the rate of this reduction appears to be controlled by convective diffusion or mass transfer from the reacting surface.

== Gaseous (molecular) form ==
Silicon monoxide molecules have been trapped in an argon matrix cooled by helium. In these conditions, the SiO bond length is between 148.9 pm and 151 pm. This bond length is similar to the length of Si=O double bonds (148 pm) in the matrix-isolated linear molecule SiO_{2} (O=Si=O), suggestive of the absence of a triple bond as in carbon monoxide. However, the SiO triple bond has a calculated bond length of 150 pm and a bond energy of 794 kJ/mol, which are also very close to those reported for SiO. In the carbon analogues the formal double bonds of carbon dioxide (116 pm) is also close to the triple bond length of carbon monoxide (112.8 pm); in light of this the observed bond length of SiO may be consistent with at least some triple-bond character in the diatomic molecule. The SiO double bond structure is, notably, an exception to Lewis' octet rule for molecules composed of the light main group elements, whereas the SiO triple bond satisfies this rule. That anomaly not withstanding, the observation that monomeric SiO is short-lived and that (SiO)_{'n'} oligomers with 'n' = 2,3,4,5 are known, all having closed ring structures in which the silicon atoms are connected through bridging oxygen atoms (i.e. each oxygen atom is singly bonded to two silicon atoms; no Si-Si bonds), suggests the Si=O double bond structure, with a hypovalent silicon atom, is likely for the monomer.

Condensing molecular SiO in argon matrix together with fluorine, chlorine or carbonyl sulfide (COS), followed by irradiation with light, produces the planar molecules OSiF_{2} (with Si-O distance 148 pm) and OSiCl_{2} (Si-O 149 pm), and the linear molecule OSiS (Si-O 149 pm, Si-S 190 pm).

Matrix-isolated molecular SiO reacts with oxygen atoms generated by microwave discharge to produce molecular SiO_{2} which has a linear structure.

When metal atoms (such as Na, Al, Pd, Ag, and Au) are co-deposited with SiO, triatomic molecules are produced with linear (AlSiO and PdSiO), non-linear (AgSiO and AuSiO), and ring (NaSiO) structures.

== Solid (polymeric) form ==
Potter reported SiO solid as yellowish-brown in color and as being an electrical and thermal insulator. The solid burns in oxygen and decomposes water with the liberation of hydrogen. It dissolves in warm alkali hydroxides and in hydrofluoric acid. Even though Potter reported the heat of combustion of SiO to be 200 to 800 calories higher than that of an equilibrium mixture of Si and SiO_{2} (which could, arguably, be used as evidence that SiO is a unique chemical compound), some studies characterized commercially available solid silicon monoxide materials as an inhomogeneous mixture of amorphous SiO_{2} and amorphous Si with some chemical bonding at the interface of the Si and SiO_{2} phases. Recent spectroscopic studies in a correlation with Potter's report suggest that commercially available solid silicon monoxide materials can not be considered as an inhomogeneous mixture of amorphous SiO_{2} and amorphous Si.

== Interstellar occurrence ==
Interstellar SiO was first reported in 1971 after detection in the giant molecular cloud Sgr B2. SiO is used as a molecular tracer of shocked gas in protostellar outflows.
