= Sagittarius A =

Radio source at center of the Milky Way

Molecular cloud
- Giant molecular cloud
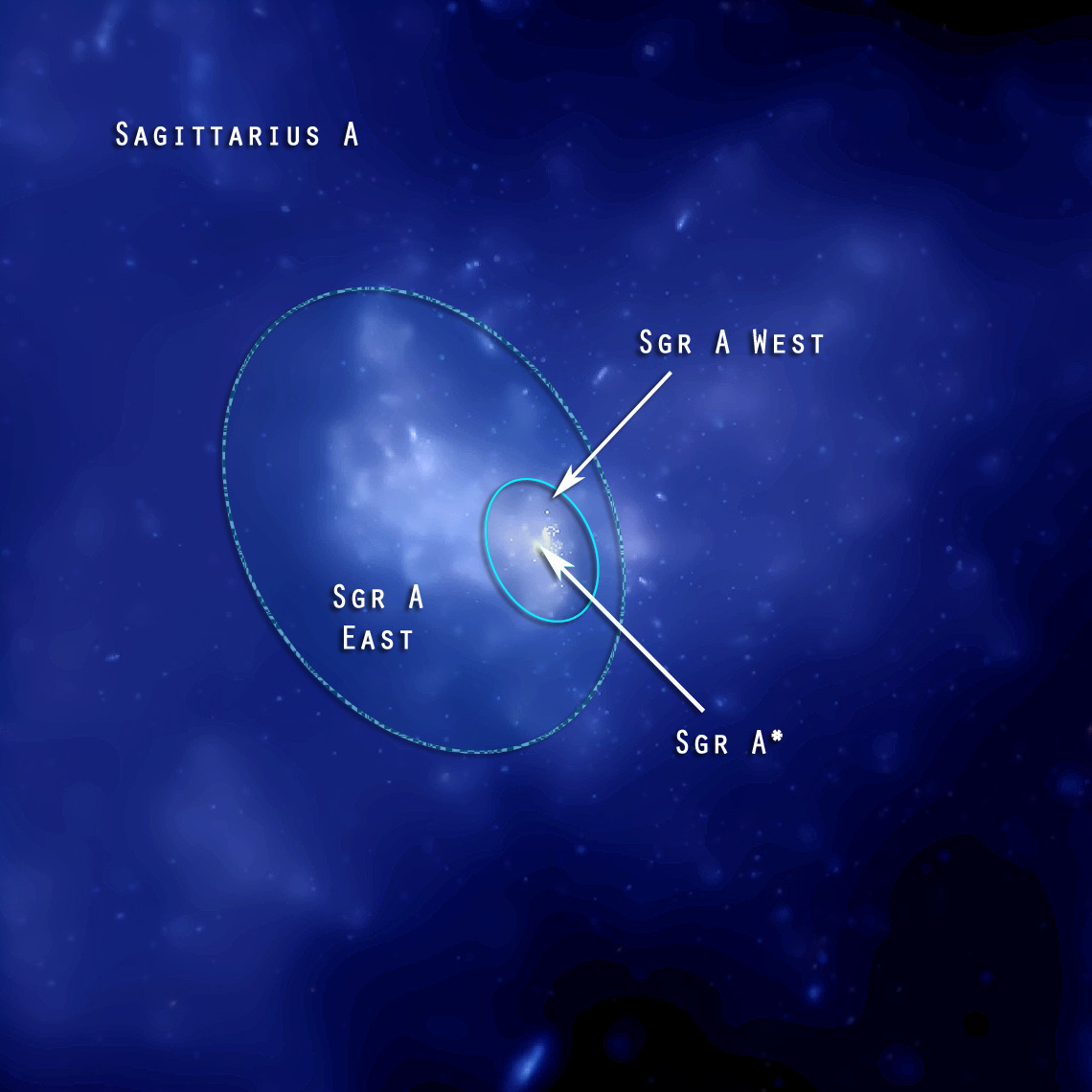
- Chandra X-ray Observatory image of Sagittarius A

Observation data: J2000.0 epoch
- Right ascension: 17^{h} 45^{m} 40.0409^{s}
- Declination: −29° 00′ 28.118″
- Constellation: Sagittarius
- Designations: Sagittarius A, Sgr A

Sagittarius A, abbreviated as Sgr A, is a complex radio source at the center of the Milky Way. Viewed from Earth, it is located near the border of the constellations Sagittarius and Scorpius, though it is hidden from view at optical wavelengths by large clouds of cosmic dust in the spiral arms of the Milky Way. The dust lane that obscures the Galactic Center from a vantage point around the Sun causes the Great Rift through the bright bulge of the galaxy.

The radio source consists of three components: the supernova remnant Sagittarius A East; the spiral structure Sagittarius A West; and the supermassive black hole Sagittarius A*, the source of the strongest radio emissions. Sagittarius A* is located at the center of Sagittarius A West, while Sagittarius A West appears off-center within Sagittarius A East. Sagittarius A East is by far the largest of the three.

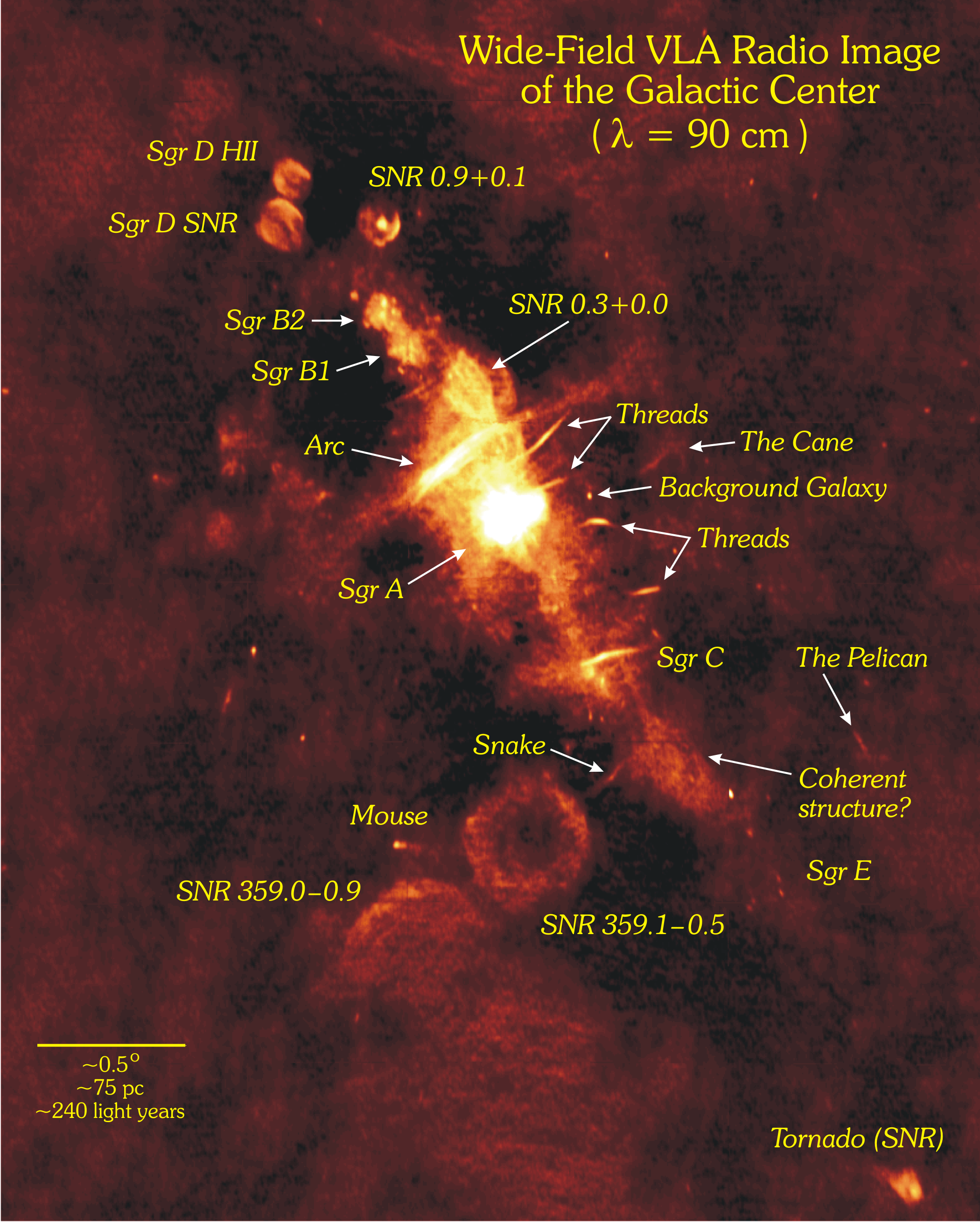
Sgr A and environs, as seen at 90 cm wavelength (in the microwave range) by the Very Large Array

== Discovery ==
In April 1933, Karl Jansky, considered one of the fathers of radio astronomy, discovered that a radio signal was coming from a location in the direction of the constellation of Sagittarius, towards the center of the Milky Way. His observations did not extend quite as far south as we now know to be the Galactic Center. Observations by Jack Piddington and Harry Minnett using the CSIRO radio telescope at Potts Hill Reservoir, in Sydney discovered a discrete and bright "Sagittarius-Scorpius" radio source, which after further observation with the 80-foot (24-metre) CSIRO radio telescope at Dover Heights was identified in a letter to Nature as the probable Galactic Center. The name Sagittarius A was first used in 1954 by John D. Kraus, Hsien-Ching Ko, and Sean Matt when they included the object in the list of radio sources found with the Ohio State University radio telescope at 250 MHz. As was common practice at the time, sources were named by constellation with capital letters in order of brightness within each constellation, with A denoting the brightest radio source within the constellation.

== Sagittarius A East ==
Sgr A East is a supernova remnant (SNR) located 7 light-years from Sgr A* and spanning approximately 27 light-years in diameter, originating from an explosion between 1,000 and 10,000 years ago. Though its status as a SNR was initially debated, the observed abundance of heavier elements, such as a higher ratio of Mn/Fe and Ni/Fe, closely aligns with theoretical models of SNR. The emission lines of heavier elements in the X-ray band indicate it may have originated from a Type Iax supernova, potentially making it the first of its kind to be observed in the Milky Way.

Sgr A East's morphology varies across spectroscopic observing bands. In radio wavelengths the brightest areas are along the outer edges of the region, whereas in X-ray it is brightest at its center. These morphological variations are most likely from interactions between the SNR and the dense interstellar medium at the Galactic Center.

A separate study showed that the region likely contains overionized plasma, atypical of supernova remnants. This may indicate that the remnant underwent unique evolutionary processes following its initial explosion, such as ionization by charged particles from Sgr A*, rapid cooling, or thermal interactions with nearby material.

It is conjectured that Sgr A East is the remnant of the explosion of a star that was gravitationally compressed as it made a close approach to the central black hole.

== Sagittarius A West ==
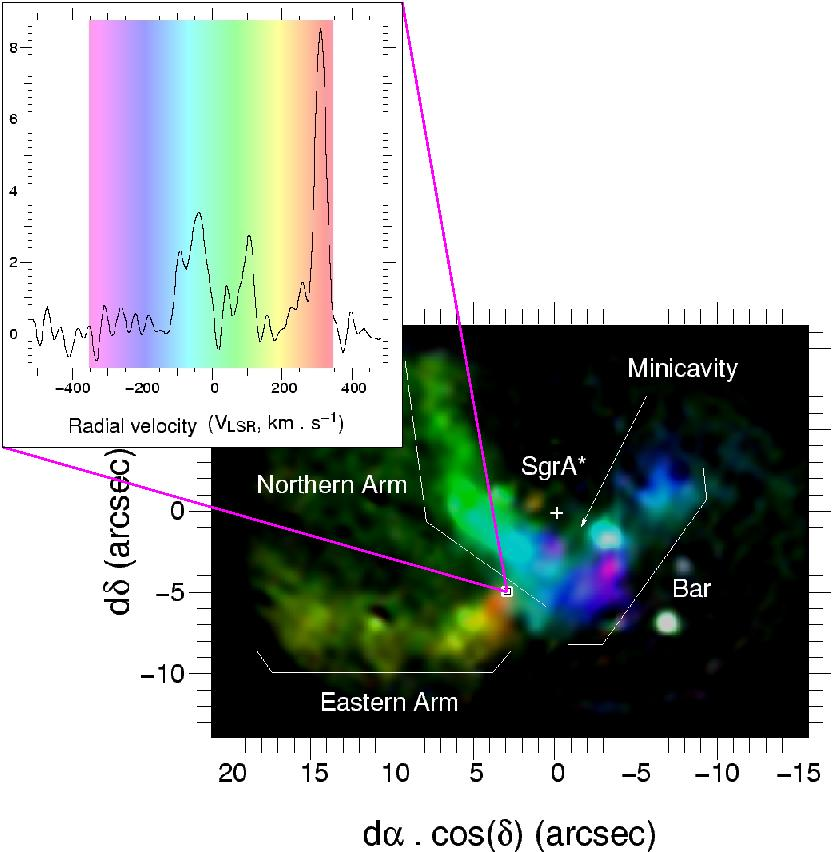
Surface brightness and velocity field of the inner part of Sagittarius A West

Sgr A West has the appearance of a three-arm spiral, from the point of view of the Earth. For this reason, it is also known as the "Minispiral". This appearance and nickname are misleading, though: the three-dimensional structure of the Minispiral is not that of a spiral. It is made of several dust and gas clouds, which orbit and fall onto Sagittarius A* at velocities as high as 1,000 kilometers per second. The surface layer of these clouds is ionized. The source of ionisation is the population of massive stars (more than one hundred OB stars have been identified so far) that also occupy the central parsec.

Sgr A West is surrounded by a massive, clumpy torus of cooler molecular gas, the Circumnuclear Disk (CND). The nature and kinematics of the Northern Arm cloud of Sgr A West suggest that it once was a clump in the CND, which fell due to some perturbation, perhaps the supernova explosion responsible for Sgr A East. The Northern Arm appears as a very bright North—South ridge of emission, but it extends far to the East and can be detected as a dim extended source.

The Western Arc (outside the field of view of the image shown in the right) is interpreted as the ionized inner surface of the CND. The Eastern Arm and the Bar seem to be two additional large clouds similar to the Northern Arm, although they do not share the same orbital plane. They have been estimated to amount for about 20 solar masses each.

On top of these large scale structures (of the order of a few light-years in size), many smaller cloudlets and holes inside the large clouds can be seen. The most prominent of these perturbations is the Minicavity, which is interpreted as a bubble blown inside the Northern Arm by the stellar wind of a massive star, which is not clearly identified.

== Sagittarius A* ==
The supermassive black hole Sagittarius A*, imaged by the Event Horizon Telescope

Astronomers now have evidence that there is a supermassive black hole at the center of the galaxy. Sagittarius A* (abbreviated Sgr A*) is agreed to be the most plausible candidate for the location of this supermassive black hole. The Very Large Telescope in Chile and Keck Telescope in Hawaii have detected stars orbiting Sgr A* at speeds greater than that of any other stars in the galaxy. One star, designated S2, was calculated to orbit Sgr A* at speeds of over 5,000 kilometers per second at its closest approach.

A gas cloud, G2, passed through the Sagittarius A* region in 2014 and managed to do so without disappearing beyond the event horizon, as theorists predicted would happen. Rather, it disintegrated, suggesting that G2 and a previous gas cloud, G1, were star remnants with larger gravitational fields than gas clouds.

In September 2019, scientists found that Sagittarius A* had been consuming nearby matter at a much faster rate than usual over the previous year. Researchers speculated that this could mean that the black hole is entering a new phase, or that Sagittarius A* had stripped the outer layer of G2 when it passed through.

== See also ==
- Sagittarius B2
- Sagittarius C
