= Sagittarius B2 =

Molecular cloud

Molecular cloud
- Giant molecular cloud
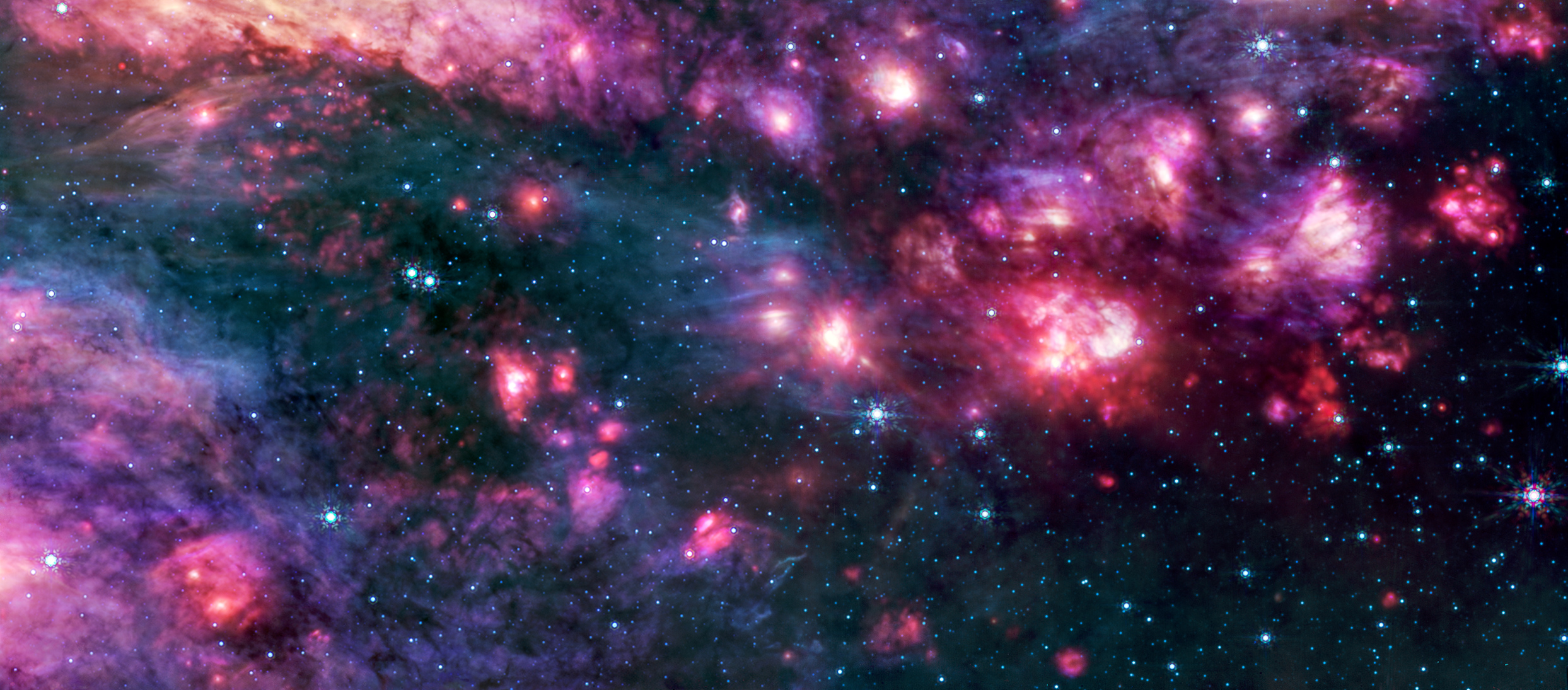
- James Webb Space Telescope Mid-Infrared Instrument image of star-formation in Sagittarius B2. North is on the right side of this image.

Observation data: J2000.0 epoch
- Right ascension: 17^{h} 47^{m} 20.4^{s}
- Declination: −28° 23′ 07″
- Constellation: Sagittarius

Physical characteristics
- Radius: 23 pc
- Designations: Sagittarius B2, Sgr B2

Sagittarius B2 (Sgr B2) is a giant molecular cloud of gas and dust that is located about 120 parsecs (390 ly) from the center of the Milky Way. This complex is the largest molecular cloud in the vicinity of the core and one of the largest in the galaxy, spanning a region about 45 parsecs (150 ly) across. The total mass of Sgr B2 is about 3 million times the mass of the Sun. The mean hydrogen density within the cloud is 3000 atoms per cm^{3}, which is about 20–40 times denser than a typical molecular cloud.

== Structure and composition ==
The internal structure of this cloud is complex, with varying densities and temperatures. The cloud is divided into three main cores, designated north (N), middle or main (M) and south (S) respectively. Thus Sgr B2(N) represents the north core. The sites Sgr B2(M) and Sgr B2(N) are sites of prolific star formation. The first 10 H II regions discovered were designated A through J. H II regions A–G, I and J lie within Sgr B2(M), while region K is in Sgr B2(N) and region H is in Sgr B2(S). The 5-parsec-wide core of the cloud is a star-forming region that is emitting about 10 million times the luminosity of the Sun.

The cloud is composed of various kinds of complex molecules, of particular interest: alcohol. The cloud contains ethanol, vinyl alcohol, and methanol. This is due to the conglomeration of atoms resulting in new molecules. The composition was discovered via spectrograph in an attempt to discover amino acids. An ester, ethyl formate, was also discovered, which is a major precursor to amino acids. This ester is also responsible for the flavour of raspberries, leading some articles on Sagittarius B2 to postulate the cloud as smelling of ‘raspberry rum’. Large quantities of butyronitrile (propyl cyanide) and other alkyl cyanides have also been detected as being present in the cloud.

Temperatures in the cloud vary from 300 K (27 °C) in dense star-forming regions to 40 K (−233.2 °C) in the surrounding envelope. Because the average temperature and pressure in Sgr B2 are low, chemistry based on the direct interaction of atoms is exceedingly slow. However, the Sgr B2 complex contains cold dust grains consisting of a silicon core surrounded by a mantle of water ice and various carbon compounds. The surfaces of these grains allow chemical reactions to occur by accreting molecules that can then interact with neighboring compounds. The resulting compounds can then evaporate from the surface and join the molecular cloud.

== Observation and research ==
The molecular components of this cloud can be readily observed in the 10^{2}–10^{3} μm range of wavelengths. About half of all the known interstellar molecules were first found near Sgr B2, and nearly every other currently known molecule has since been detected in this feature.

The European Space Agency's gamma-ray observatory INTEGRAL has observed gamma rays interacting with Sgr B2, causing X-ray emission from the molecular cloud. This energy was emitted about 350 years prior by the supermassive black hole (SMBH) at the galaxy's core, Sagittarius A*. The total luminosity from this outburst is an estimated million times stronger than the current output from Sagittarius A*. This conclusion was supported in 2011 by Japanese astronomers who observed the Galactic Center with the Suzaku satellite.

Observations with the James Webb Space Telescope revealed new candidate H II region that were missed with radio observations. At 25 μm the researchers found infrared radiation escaping the protocluster Sgr B2 N, following the path of a large-scale outflow. YSOs previously detected with ALMA in the western side of the cloud are not detected with JWST, but hot dust around their outflows is detected with JWST. On the eastern side JWST detects recent star-formation.

== Gallery ==
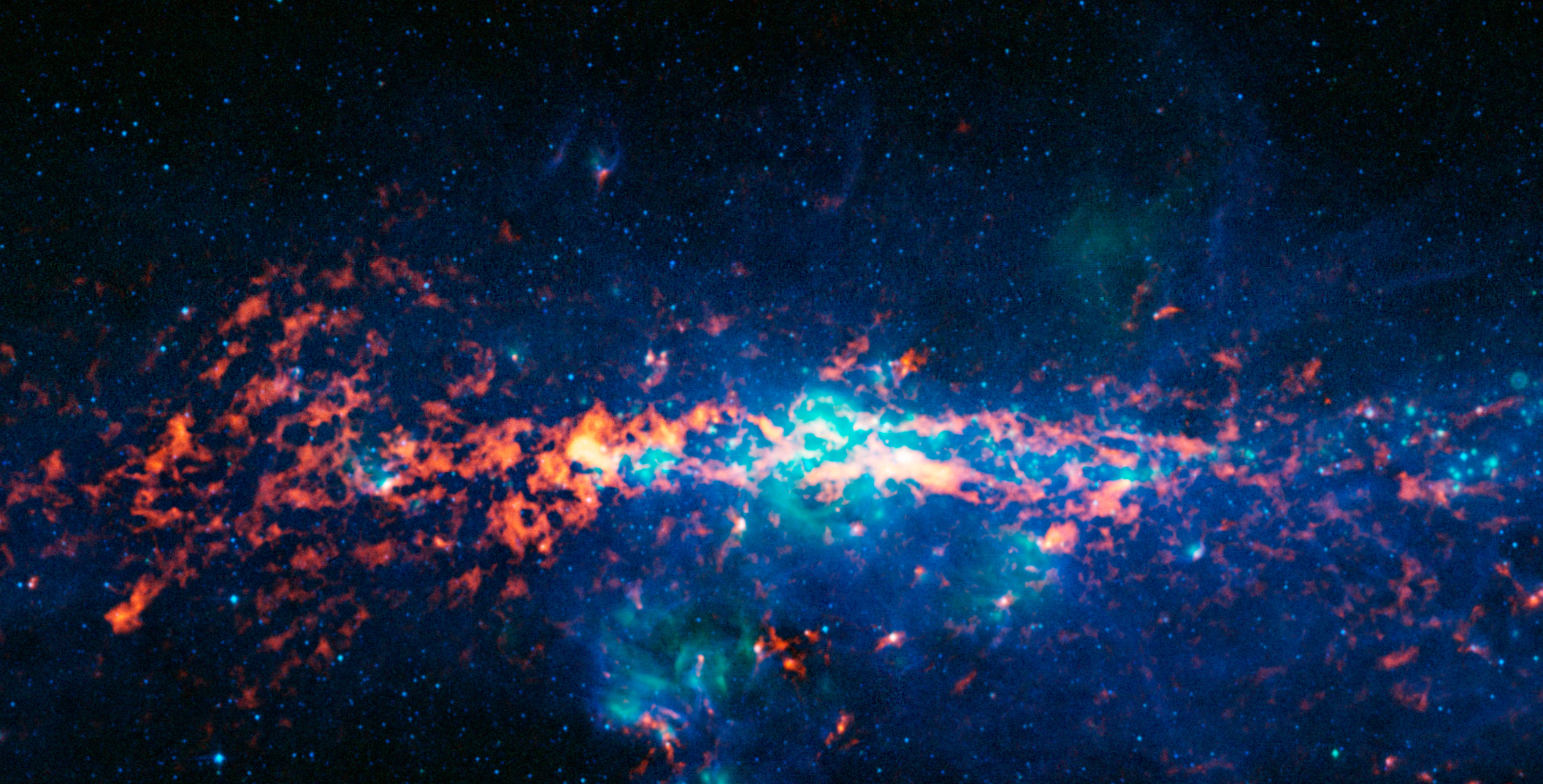
Sagittarius B2 is seen here the right orange-red region to the middle left of the image. Image by ATLASGAL (red) and MSX (blue, green).

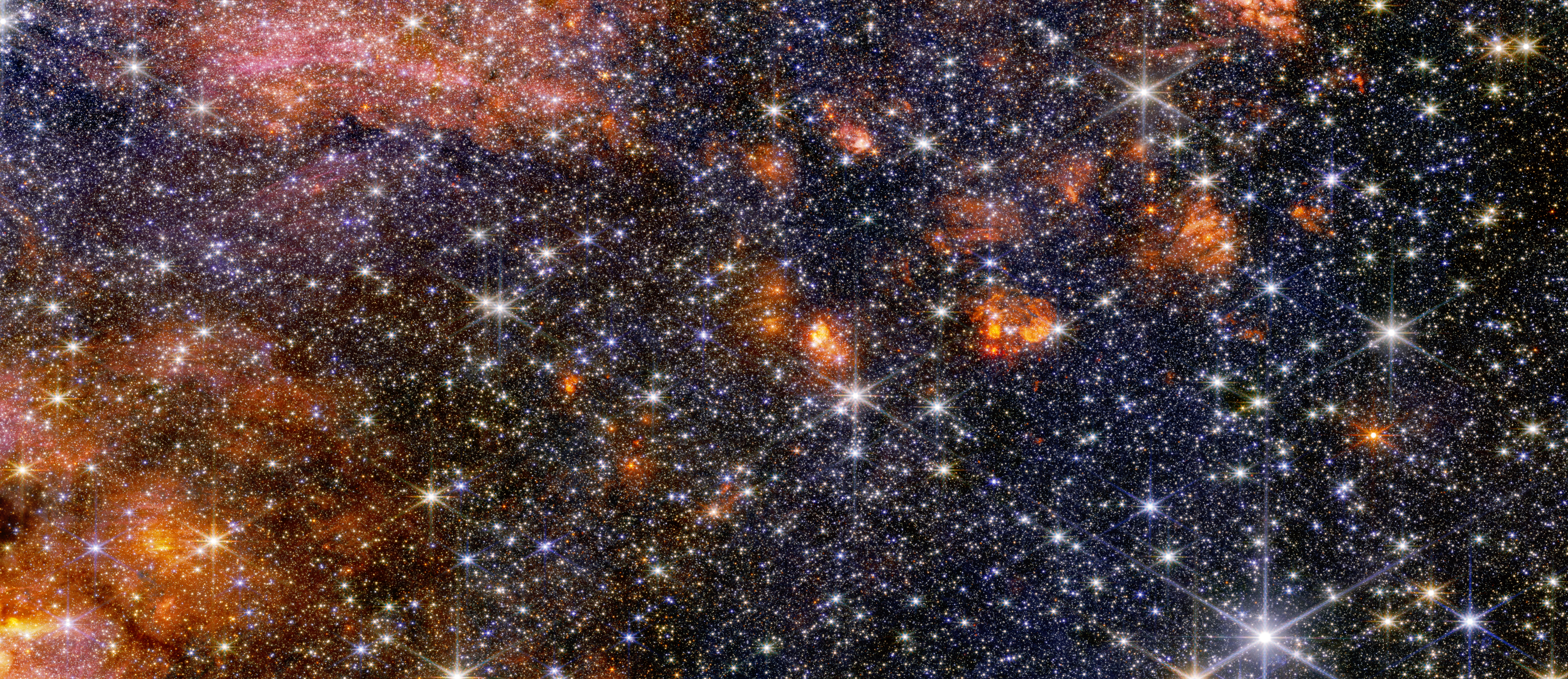
JWST NIRCam image of star-formation in Sagittarius B2.

== See also ==
- Sagittarius A
- Sagittarius C
- Large Molecule Heimat
- List of molecules in interstellar space
