= Stellar engulfment =

Process where a red giant star engulfs a planet

Infographic on a Sun-like star evolving into a red giant and engulfing a planet.

Stellar engulfment is the process in which a star at the end of its main sequence phase of its life expands into a red giant star and engulfs some or all of the planets or brown dwarfs orbiting around it. The majority of planetary systems (around 61%) including the Solar System will experience at least one stellar engulfment event on the onset of Helium fusion and near the first dredge-up. It can also occur if the planet's orbit around a main-sequence star decays until it hits the surface; the first observed engulfment event, ZTF SLRN-2020, was likely of this type.

Engulfments of giant planets are observed from Earth as low-luminosity luminous red novae. While engulfment of planets can leave behind traces, particularly with lithium, it is quickly diluted. The same is the case for brown dwarfs.

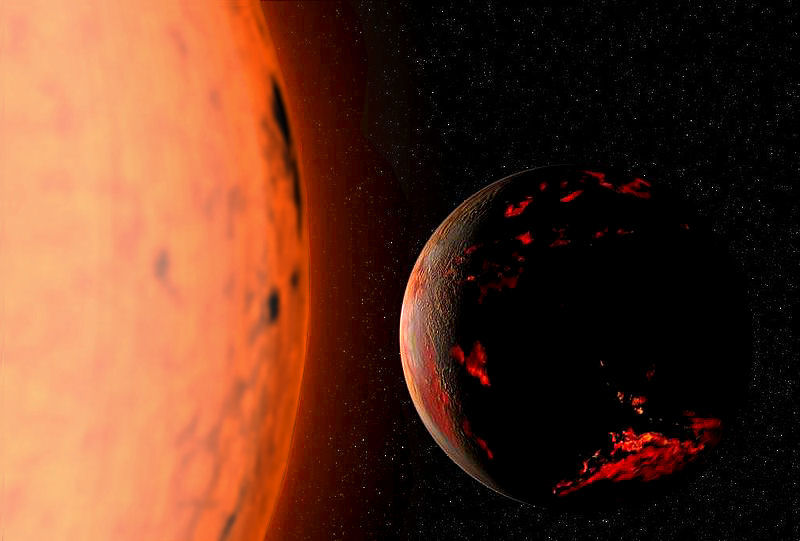
Red giant Sun and Earth.

In around five billion years from now, the Sun will evolve out of the main sequence branch and into a red giant. Its expansion will cause it to engulf much of the inner planets of the Solar System including Mercury, Venus and possibly Earth.

== See also ==
- Common envelope
- Contact binary
- Interacting binary star
- Neutron star merger
- Stellar collision
