= M101 OT2015-1 =

Contact binary which resulted in one star

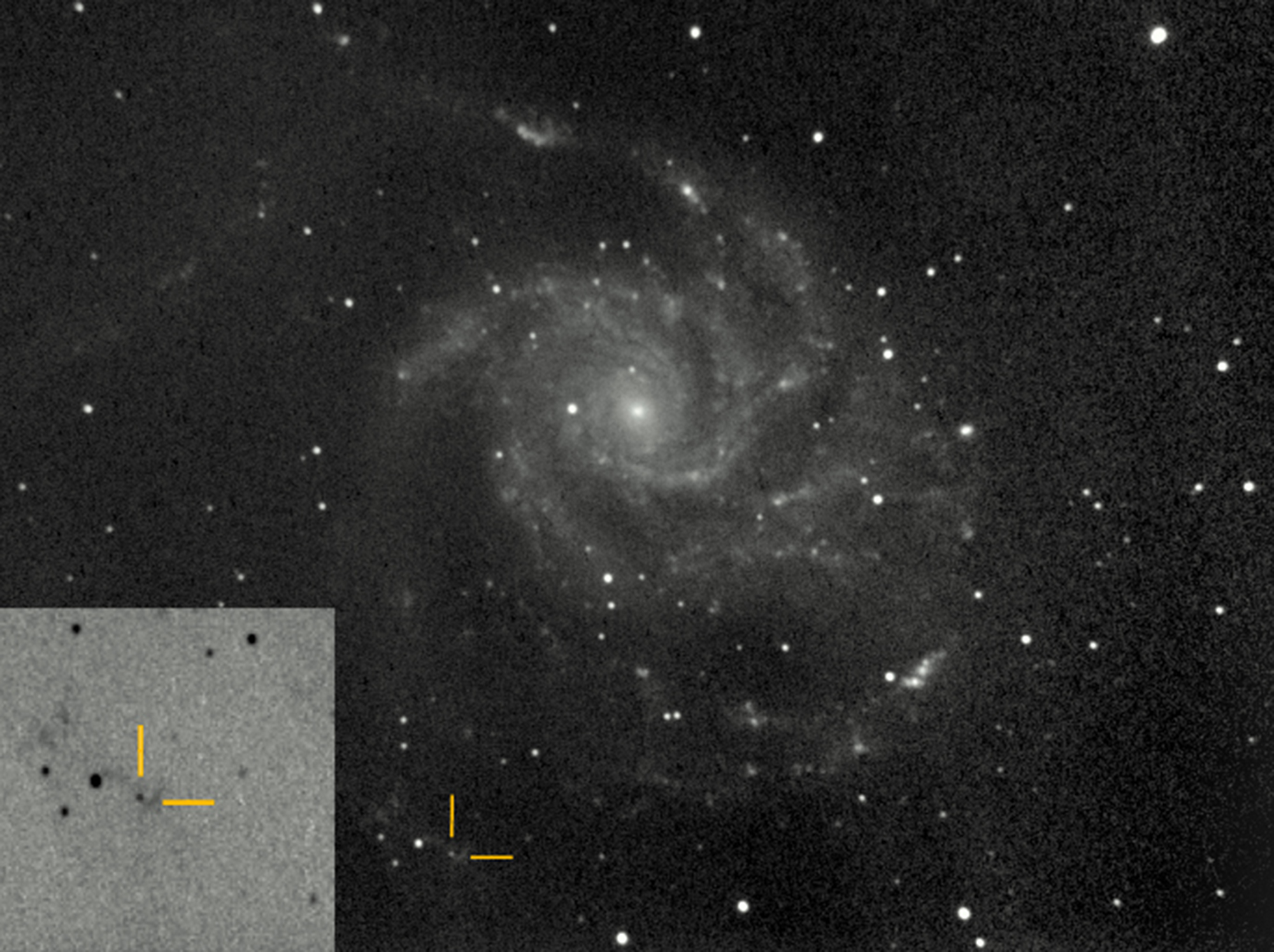
- Discovery image
- Event type: Luminous red nova
- Date: February 10, 2015
- Constellation: Ursa Major
- Right ascension: 14^{h} 02^{m} 16.78^{s}
- Declination: +54° 26′ 20.5″
- Epoch: J2000
- Distance: 21 Mly
- Host: Pinwheel Galaxy (M101)
- Peak apparent magnitude: 16.5
- Other designations: AT 2015dl, PSN J14021678+5426205, iPTF13afz

M101 OT2015-1 (also known as PSN J14021678+5426205, iPTF13afz and AT 2015dl) is a contact binary that merged into a single star, in a process known as a luminous red nova (LRN). M101 OT2015-1 is an optical transient located in the Pinwheel Galaxy (M101). Luminous red novae are representatives of the sparsely populated class of exploding variables which have been known since 1988, when such a star (M31-RV) appeared in the galaxy M31.

== Discovery ==
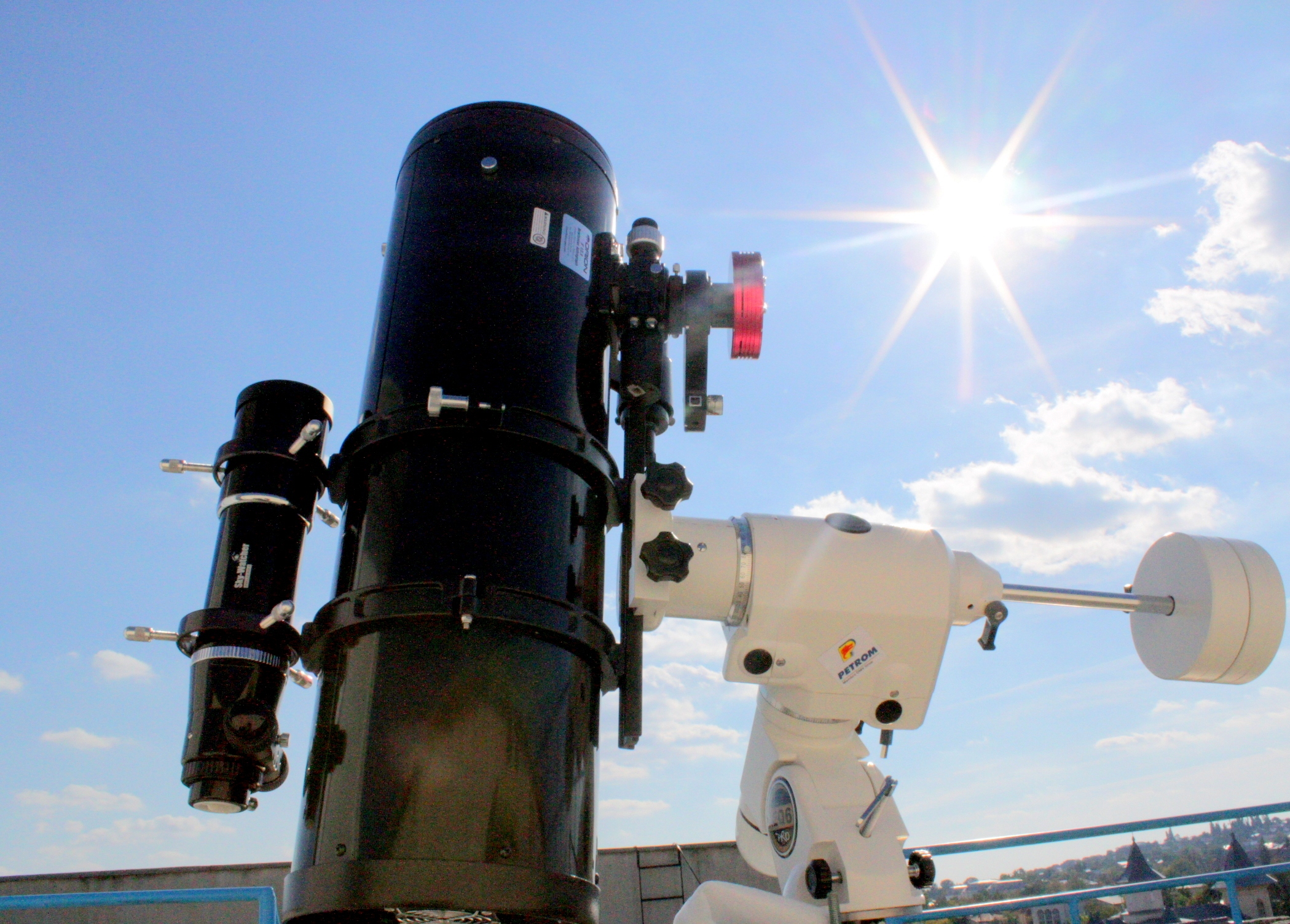
Astronomical Observatory of the Museum Vasile Pârvan in Bârlad, România

M101 OT2015-1 was discovered on February 10, 2015 by Dumitru Ciprian Vîntdevară from Planetarium and Astronomical Observatory of the Museum Vasile Pârvan in Bârlad, Romania. The transient is located in the outer reaches of a spiral arm of M101, at 489″ W and 324″ N of the measured position of the galaxy nucleus. The transient was discovered with a Newtonian telescope 0,2 m + CCD camera ATIK 320E (on unfiltered) + EQ6 mount. On February 13, 2015, the New Zealand astronomer Stu Parker, using a telescope located in Spain, confirmed that a new object was visible in the M101 galaxy. The new object was initially reported as a possible supernova, with the designation PSN J14021678+5426205. Later it was shown that the new star was not a supernova, and for a while its nature remained uncertain. One month after the discovery, on March 11, 2015, an Astronomer's Telegram was published where the new star was described as a luminous red nova, confirmed spectroscopically.

The final confirmation came a year later, on 2016 January 28, from observations carried out in several astronomic observatories in Russia.

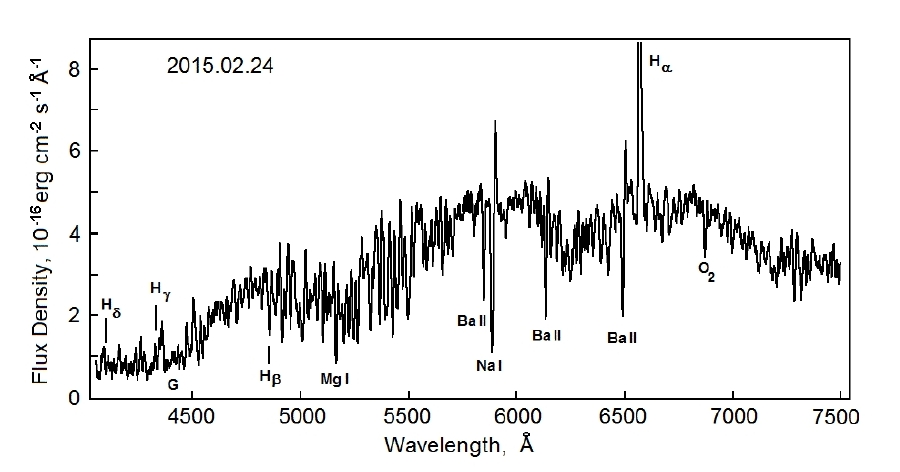
Spectrum of the LRN in M101 obtained with the BTA telescope and the SCORPIO camera on February 24, 2015 near the maximum of the second outburst.

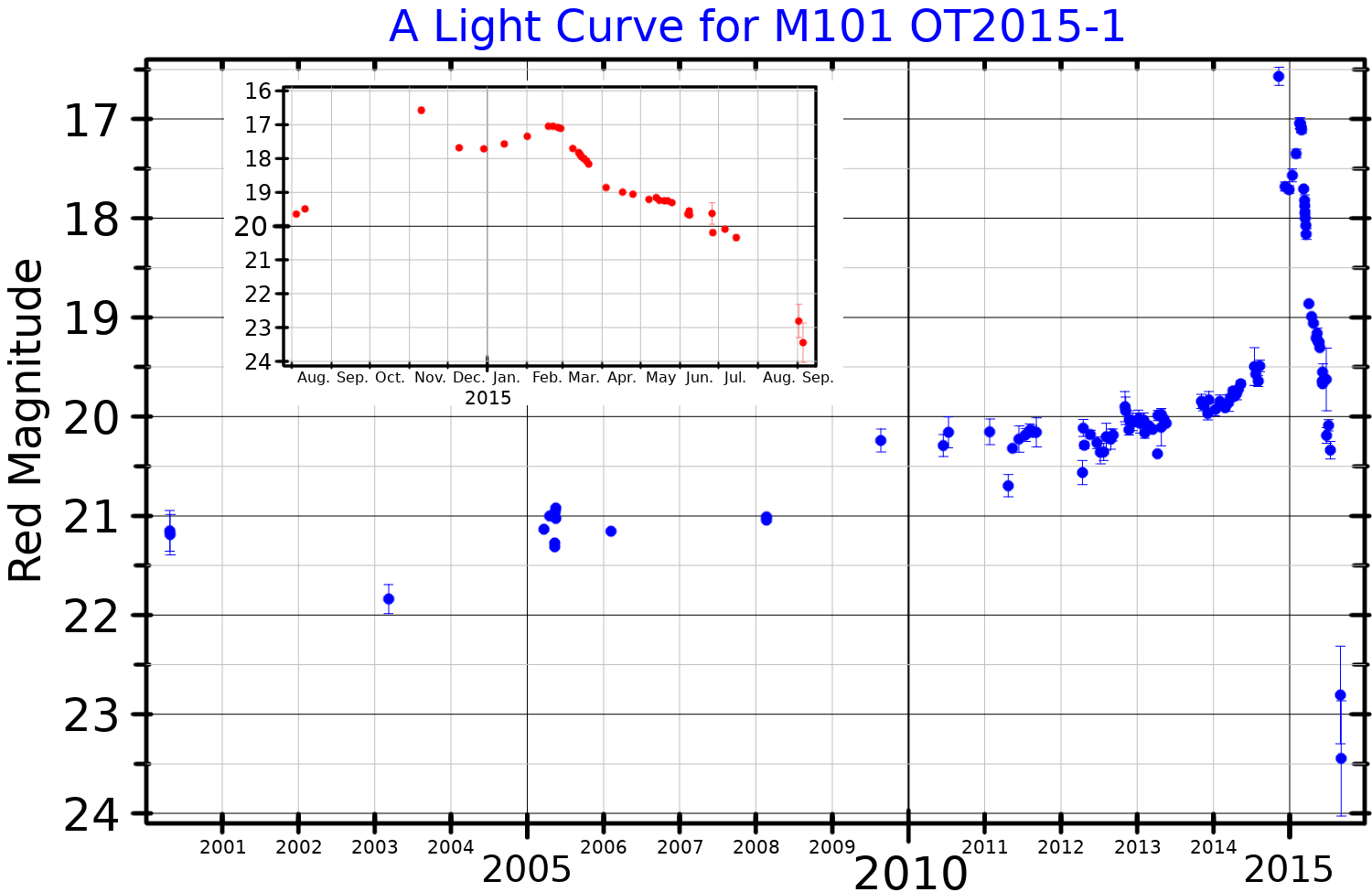
A red band light curve for M101 OT2015-1, adapted from Blagorodnova et al. (2017). The inset plot shows the time near the outburst with an expanded scale.

== Observations ==
Pre-discovery observations of the LRN/M101
Date	JD 24...	B	V	R	Source
1993.04.15	49093	-	22.0	-	POSS II, Kodak IIIaJ
2003.03.07-10	52707	21.6	21.2	20.90	SDSS, ATel 7082
2011.11.25	55891	20.95	20.95	21.03	R. Pecce, Flickr.com
2012.03.20	56007	21.74	21.47	21.13	D. Hartmann, Astrobin
2012.02.14-27	56009	21.34	21.06	20.63	T. Hankock, RGB images
2012.05.10	56058	21.12	21.35	21.30	O. Bryzgalov, Flickr.com
2012.05.26	56074	21.55	21.27	21.20	O. Bryzgalov, Flickr.com
2012.01-06	56109	21.30	20.97	20.69	ATel 7069, LBT
2013.02.01	56324	-	-	20.60	ATel 7070, PTF
2013.04	56360	20.48	20.50	20.36	Z. Orbanic, Flickr.com
2013.03-05	56398	20.6	20.4	20.40	R. Pfile, Flickr.com
2013.06.11	56455	20.95	20.73	20.30	S. Furlong, Flickr.com
2013.06.29	56473	21.0	20.5	20.9	C. Frenzi, Flickr.com
2014.06-07	56839	20.02	19.78	19.59	ATel 7069, LBT
2014.11.10	56971	-	-	16.36	ATel 7070, PTF
2014.11.13	56975	-	16.40	-	K. Itagaki, CBAT
2015.01.14	57036	-	-	17.50	PTF
2015.01.19	57042	20.20	18.80	18.23	ATel 7069, LBT
2015.01.20	57043	-	18.50	-	K. Itagaki, CBAT
2015.02.10	57064.4	-	17.50	-	C. D. Vîntdevară, discovery

== Other information ==
Although the nature of the object is still debated, its resemblance with other transients from the same LRN family points towards a possible binary origin. The unusual location of the progenitor star in the Hertzsprung gap supports the hypothesis that the most massive component had expanded beyond its roche lobe, initiating the common envelope phase. The outbursts detected for M101-OT2015-1 suggest that this CE was ejected on dynamical timescales, likely leaving a surviving close binary pair. Further observations at infrared wavelengths will help to show the exact nature of the M101 OT2015-1 system.
