= V838 Monocerotis =

Star in the constellation Monoceros

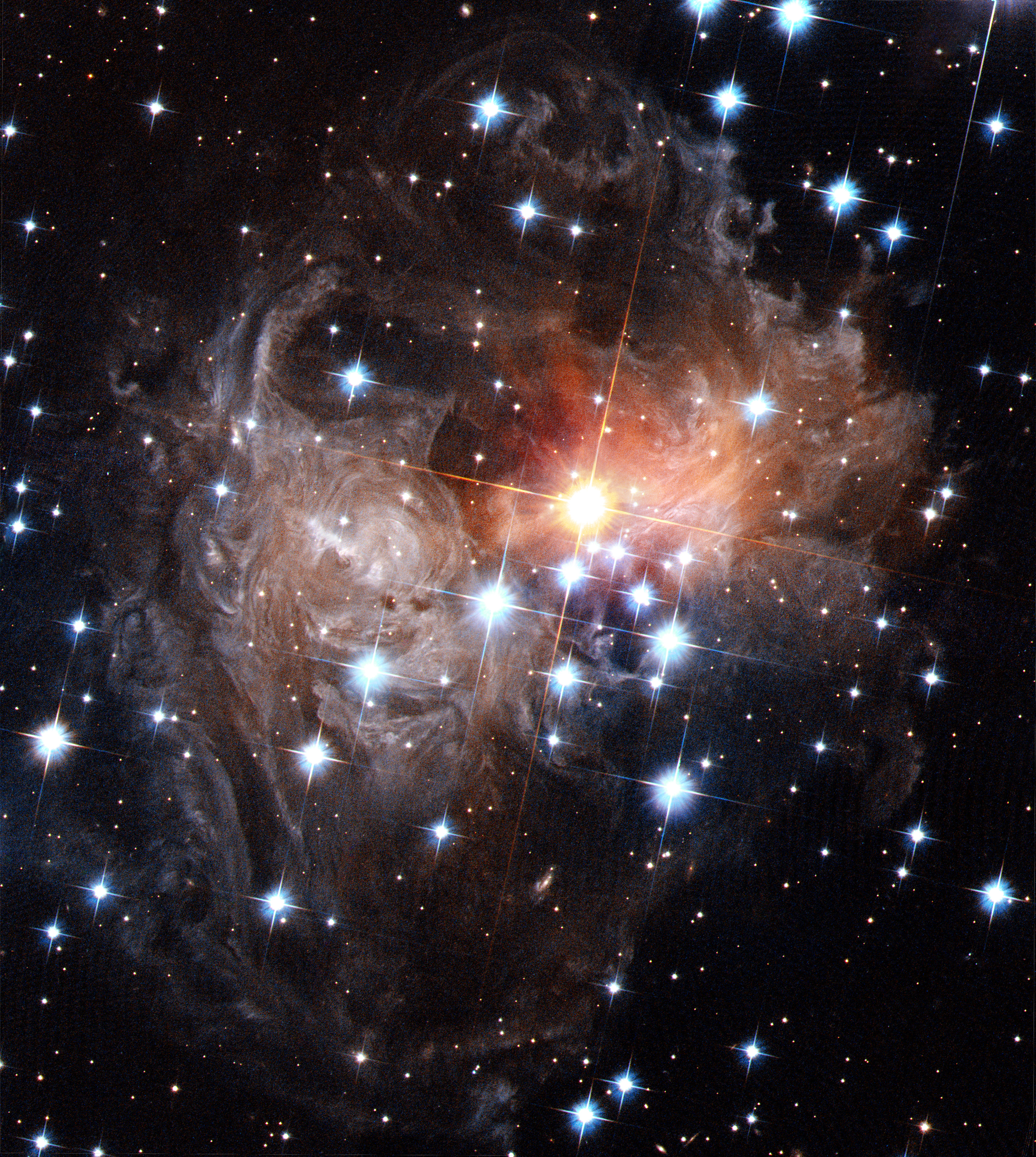
- Hubble Space Telescope image of V838 Monocerotis and the surrounding nebula on September 9, 2006

Observation data Epoch J2000.0 Equinox ICRS
- Constellation: Monoceros
- Right ascension: 07^{h} 04^{m} 04.822^{s}
- Declination: −03° 50′ 50.53″
- Apparent magnitude (V): 6.75 (2002), 15.6

Characteristics
- Evolutionary stage: M-type supergiant
- Spectral type: M7.5I -> M5.5I + B3V
- Variable type: LRN

Astrometry
Proper motion (μ)	RA: −0.536±0.229 mas/yr Dec.: −0.078±0.174 mas/yr
Parallax (π)	0.163±0.016 mas
Distance	19,200 ly (5,900±400 pc)

Details
Mass	5 – 10 M_{☉}
Radius	464 R_{☉}
Luminosity	23,000 L_{☉}
Temperature	3,300 K
Age	4 Myr

Other designations
- V838 Mon, Nova Monocerotis 2002, GSC 04822-00039

Database references
SIMBAD	data

V838 Monocerotis (Nova Monocerotis 2002) is a cataclysmic binary star in the constellation Monoceros about 19,000 light years (6 kpc) from the Sun. The previously unremarked star was observed in early 2002 experiencing a major outburst, and was one of the largest known stars for a short period following the outburst. Originally believed to be a typical nova eruption, it was then identified as the first of a new class of eruptive variables known as luminous red novae. The reason for the outburst is still uncertain, but is thought to have been a merger of two stars within a triple system.

The eruption occurred on one of two B3 main sequence stars in a close binary orbit. The erupting star appeared as an unusually cool supergiant and for a while engulfed its companion. By 2009 the temperature of the supergiant had increased (since 2005) to 3,270 K and its luminosity was 15,000 times solar (L_{☉}), but its radius had decreased to 380 times that of the Sun (R_{☉}), although the ejecta continues to expand.

== Outburst ==
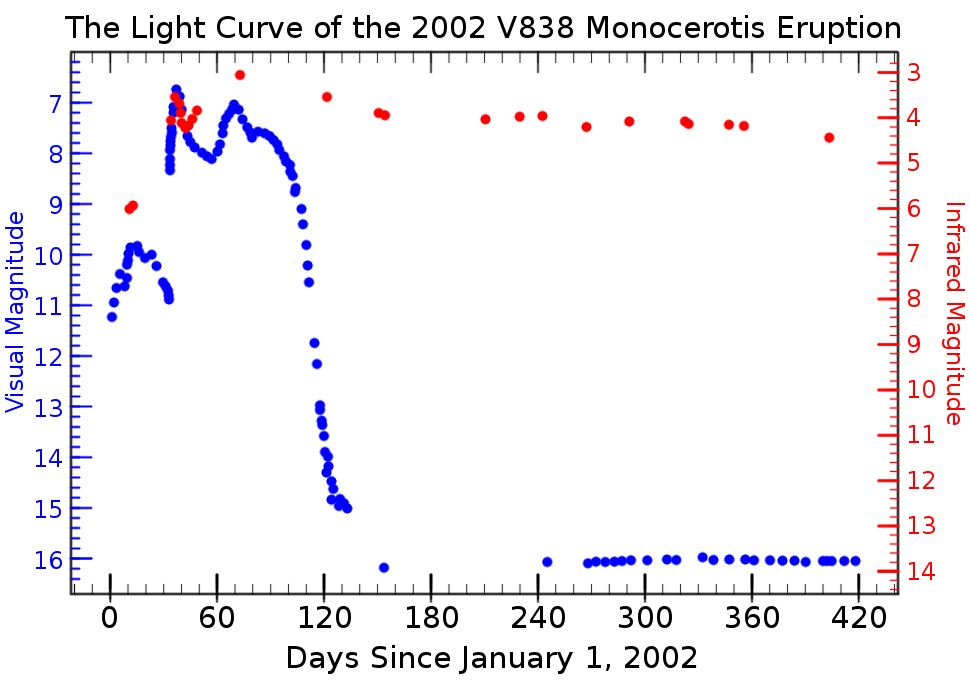
The visual (blue points) and K band infrared (red points) light curves of the 2002 eruption of V838 Monocerotis, adapted from Starrfield et al., 2004

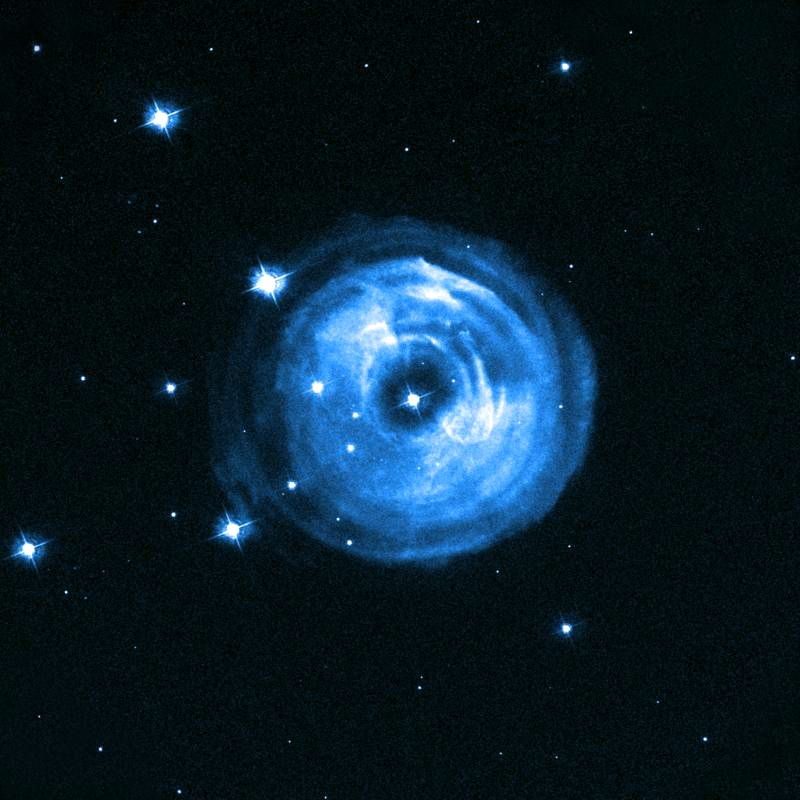
Light echo of V838 Mon as imaged April 30, 2002

On January 6, 2002, an unknown star was seen to brighten in the constellation Monoceros, the Unicorn. Being a new variable star, it was designated V838 Monocerotis, the 838th variable star of Monoceros. The initial light curve resembled that of a nova, an eruption that occurs when enough hydrogen gas accumulates on the surface of a white dwarf from its close binary companion. Therefore, the object was also designated Nova Monocerotis 2002. V838 Monocerotis reached a maximum visual magnitude of 6.75 on February 6, 2002, after which it started to dim rapidly, as expected. However, in early March, the star started to brighten again, particularly in infrared wavelengths. Yet another brightening in infrared occurred in early April. In 2003, the star returned to near its original brightness before the eruption (magnitude 15.6), but as a red supergiant rather than a blue main-sequence star. The light curve produced by the eruption was unlike anything previously seen. In 2009, the star was about 15,000 L_{☉}, which, in the absence of extinction, would correspond to an apparent magnitude of 8.5. (Note: The sun's absolute magnitude is 4.83, meaning that its apparent magnitude would be 4.83 at 10 parsecs, and V838 Mon was 15,000 times more luminous than the sun, assuming that it is 6,500 parsecs away, so the apparent magnitude of V838 Mon comes to 4.83 − 2.5×log(15000) + 5×log(6500/10) ≈ 8.5.)

Comparison between the size of V838 Monocerotis and the Inner Solar System.

The star brightened to about a million times solar luminosity and an absolute magnitude of −9.8, ensuring that at the time of maximum, it was one of the most luminous stars in the Milky Way galaxy. Its brightening was caused by a rapid expansion of its outer layers.

V838 Monocerotis was observed by use of the Palomar Testbed Interferometer, which indicated a radius of 1,570±400 R_{☉} (comparable to Jupiter's orbital radius), confirming the earlier indirect calculations. At the currently accepted distance of 6,100 pc, the measured angular diameter in late 2004 (1.83 mas) corresponded to a radius of 1,200±150 R_{☉}, but by 2014, it shrunk to 750±200 R_{☉}, around 70 solar radii larger than Antares. The expansion took only a couple of months, meaning that its speed was abnormal. Because the laws of thermodynamics dictate that expanding gases cool, the star became extremely cool and deep red. In fact, some astronomers argue that the spectrum of the star initially resembled that of L-type brown dwarfs. If that is the case, V838 Monocerotis was the first known L-type supergiant. Since then, it has shrunk and heated up and is now considered an M-type supergiant. However, current estimates of the distance, and hence of the radius, are about 25% lower than assumed in those papers.

=== Other possibly similar events ===
There are a handful of outbursts resembling that of V838 Monocerotis. In 1988, a red star was detected erupting in the Andromeda Galaxy. The star, designated M31-RV, reached the absolute bolometric magnitude of −9.95 at maximum (corresponding to a luminosity of 0.75 million L_{☉}) before dimming beyond detectability. A similar eruption, V4332 Sagittarii, occurred in 1994 in the Milky Way.

== Progenitor star ==
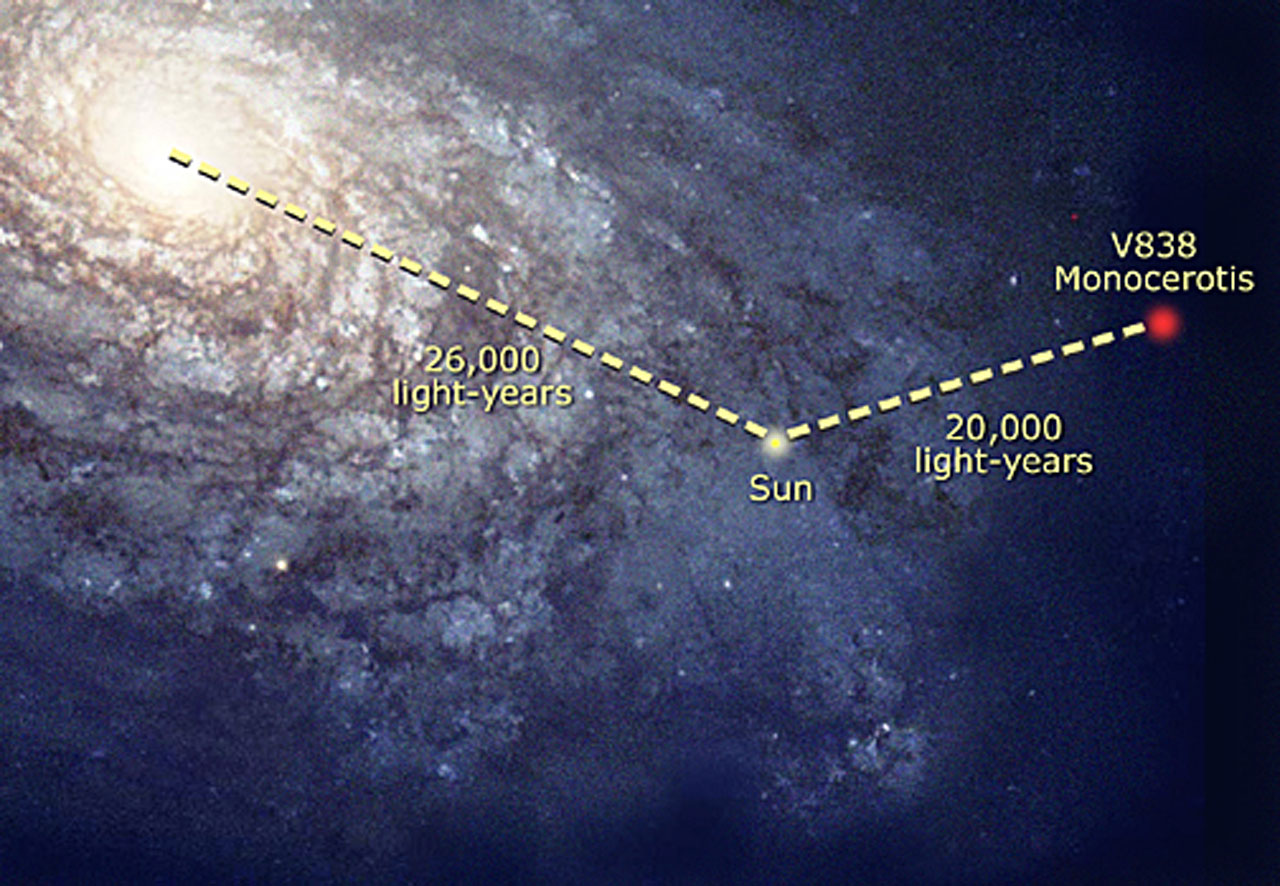
Location of V838 Monocerotis within the Milky Way galaxy.

Based on an incorrect interpretation of the light echo the eruption generated, the distance of the star was first estimated to be 1,900 to 2,900 light years. Combined with the apparent magnitude measured from pre-eruption photographs, it was thought to be an underluminous F-type dwarf, which posed a considerable enigma.

More accurate measurements gave a much larger distance, 20,000 light years (6 kpc). It appears that the star was considerably more massive and luminous than the Sun. The star probably has a mass of from 5 to 10 times the mass of the Sun (M_{☉}). It was apparently either a B1.5V star with a B3V companion, or an A0.5V with a B4V companion. In the latter case it would have had a luminosity around 550 L_{☉} (being 0.43 times as luminous as its companion), and in the former case it would have been more luminous (about 1.9 times as luminous as its companion). (Note: The reference does not explicitly give the luminosity in the first case.) The star may have originally had a radius roughly 5 R_{☉} and its temperature would have been that of a B-type star (more than 10,000K but less than 30,000K). Munari et al. (2005) suggested that the progenitor star was a very massive supergiant with an initial mass of about 65 M_{☉}, but this has been contested. There seems to be agreement that the star system is relatively young. Munari et al. conclude that the system may be only about 4 million years old.

The spectrum of V838 Monocerotis reveals a companion, a hot blue B-type main sequence star probably not very different from the progenitor star. It is also possible that the progenitor was slightly less massive than the companion and only just entering the main sequence.

Based on the photometric parallax of the companion, Munari et al. calculated a greater distance, 36,000 light years (10 kpc).

== Light echo ==
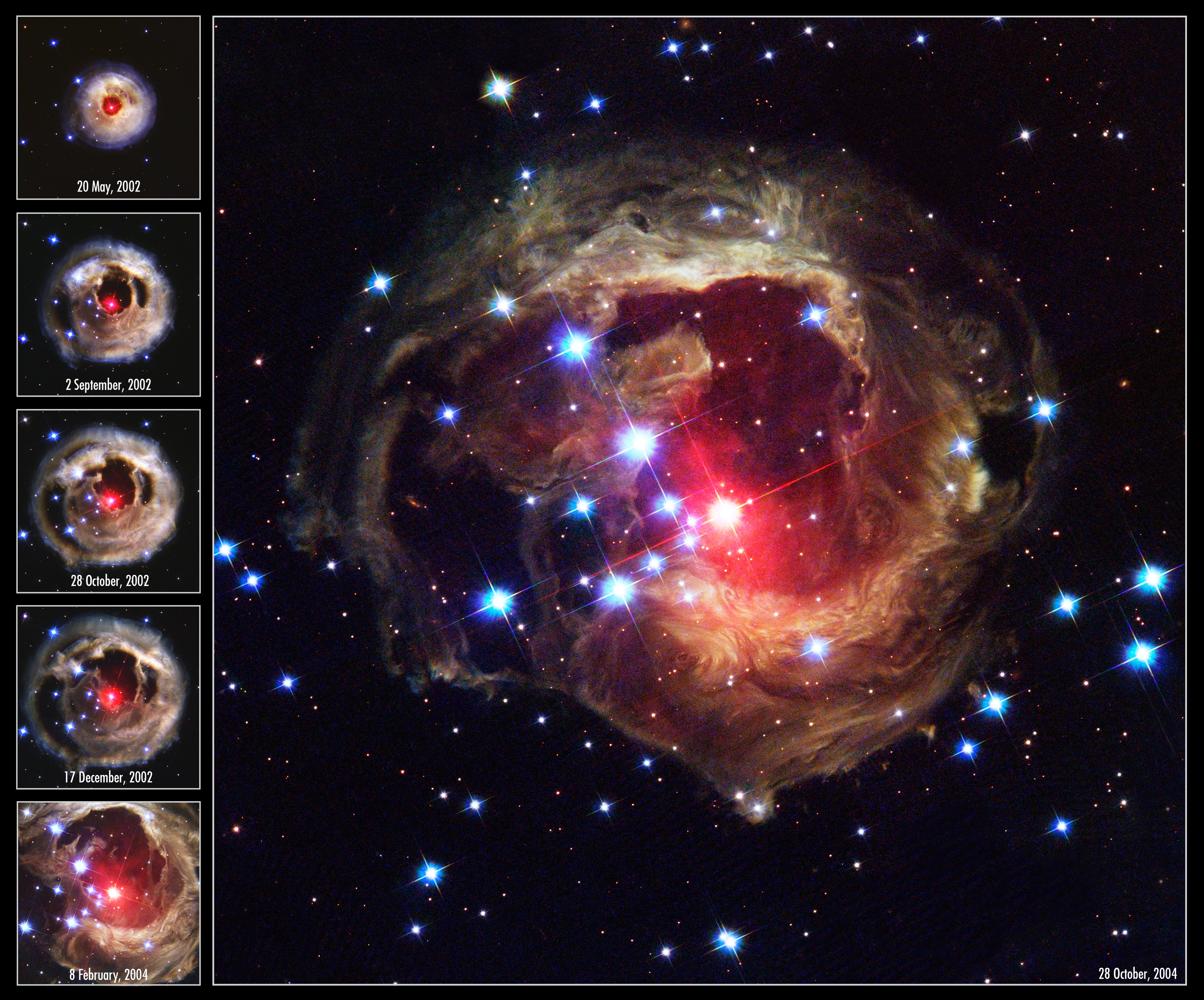
Images showing the expansion of the light echo. Credit: NASA/ESA.

The evolution of the light echo around V838 Monocerotis.

Animation of 11 images of light echo of V838 Mon

Rapidly brightening objects like novae and supernovae are known to produce a phenomenon known as light echo. The light that travels directly from the object arrives first. If there are clouds of interstellar matter around the star, some light is reflected from the clouds. Because of the longer path, the reflected light arrives later, producing a vision of expanding rings of light around the erupted object. The rings appear to travel faster than the speed of light, but in fact they do not.

In the case of V838 Monocerotis, the light echo produced was unprecedented and is well documented in images taken by the Hubble Space Telescope. While the photos appear to depict an expanding spherical shell of debris, they are actually formed by the illumination of an ever-expanding ellipsoid with the progenitor star at one focus and the observer at the other. Hence, despite appearances, the structures in these photos are actually concave toward the viewer.

By March 2003 the size of the light echo in the sky was twice the angular diameter of Jupiter and was continuing to grow. Jupiter's angular diameter varies from 30 to 51 arcseconds.

It is not yet clear if the surrounding nebulosity is associated with the star itself. If that is the case, they may have been produced by the star in earlier eruptions which would rule out several models that are based on single catastrophic events. However, there is strong evidence that the V838 Monocerotis system is very young and still embedded in the nebula from which it formed.

The eruption initially emitted at shorter wavelengths (i.e. was bluer), which can be seen in the light echo: the outer border is bluish in the Hubble images.

== Hypotheses ==
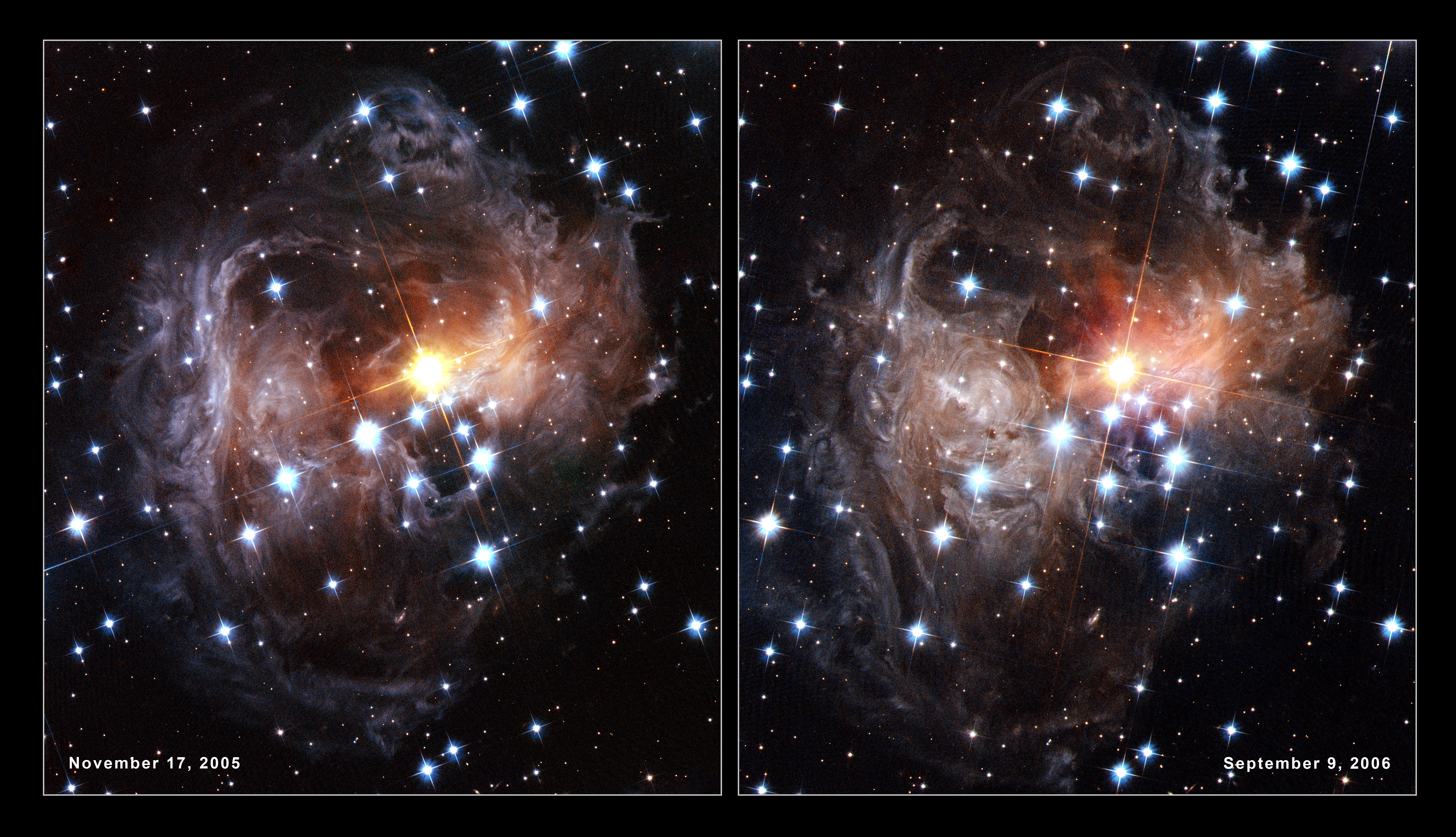
Two pictures taken in November 2005 and September 2006 showing the changes that occurred to the bright echo of V838 Mon.

This and other luminous red nova events are thought to be caused by the merger of two stars. In the case of V838 Monocerotis, it was the merger of two main sequence stars, or an 8 M_{☉} main sequence star and a 0.3 M_{☉} pre-main sequence star. The merger model explains the multiple peaks in the light curve observed during the outburst. Based on further observations of stars similar to V838 Monocerotis, such as V1309 Scorpii, astronomers have reached the conclusion that this is the most likely scenario.

Other explanations for the eruption of V838 Monocerotis have also been published.

=== Atypical nova outburst ===
The outburst of V838 Monocerotis may be a nova eruption after all, albeit a very unusual one. However, this is very unlikely considering that the system includes a B-type star, and stars of this type are young and massive. There has not been enough time for a possible white dwarf to cool and accrete enough material to cause the eruption.

=== Thermal pulse of a dying star ===
V838 Monocerotis may be a post-asymptotic giant branch star, on the verge of going supernova. The nebulosity illuminated by the light echo may actually be shells of dust surrounding the star, created by the star during previous similar outbursts. The brightening may have been a so-called helium flash, where the core of a dying low-mass star suddenly ignites helium fusion disrupting, but not destroying, the star. Such an event is known to have occurred in Sakurai's Object. However, several pieces of evidence support the argument that the dust is interstellar rather than centered on V838 Monocerotis. A dying star that has lost its outer envelopes would be appropriately hot, but the evidence points to a young star instead.

=== Thermonuclear event within a massive supergiant ===
According to some evidence, V838 Monocerotis may be a very massive supergiant. Also in this case, the outburst may have been a helium flash. Very massive stars survive multiple such events; however, they experience heavy mass loss (about half of the original mass is lost while in the main sequence) before settling as extremely hot Wolf-Rayet stars. This theory may also explain the apparent dust shells around the star. V838 Monocerotis is located in the approximate direction of the galactic anticenter and off from the disk of the Milky Way. Stellar birth is less active in outer galactic regions, and it is not clear how such a massive star can form there. However, there are very young clusters like Ruprecht 44 and the 4-million-year-old NGC 1893 at a distance of about 7 and 6 kiloparsecs, respectively.

=== Planetary capture event ===
Another possibility is that V838 Monocerotis may have swallowed its giant planets. If one of the planets entered into the atmosphere of the star, the stellar atmosphere would have begun slowing down the planet. As the planet penetrated deeper into the atmosphere, friction would become stronger and kinetic energy would be released into the star more rapidly. The star's envelope would then warm up enough to trigger deuterium fusion, which would lead to rapid expansion. The later peaks may then have occurred when two other planets entered into the expanded envelope. The authors of this model calculate that every year about 0.4 planetary capture events occur in Sun-like stars in the Milky Way galaxy, whereas for massive stars like V838 Monocerotis the rate is approximately 0.5–2.5 events per year.

=== Common envelope event ===
See Common envelope
