= KSw 71 =

Star in the constellation Lyra

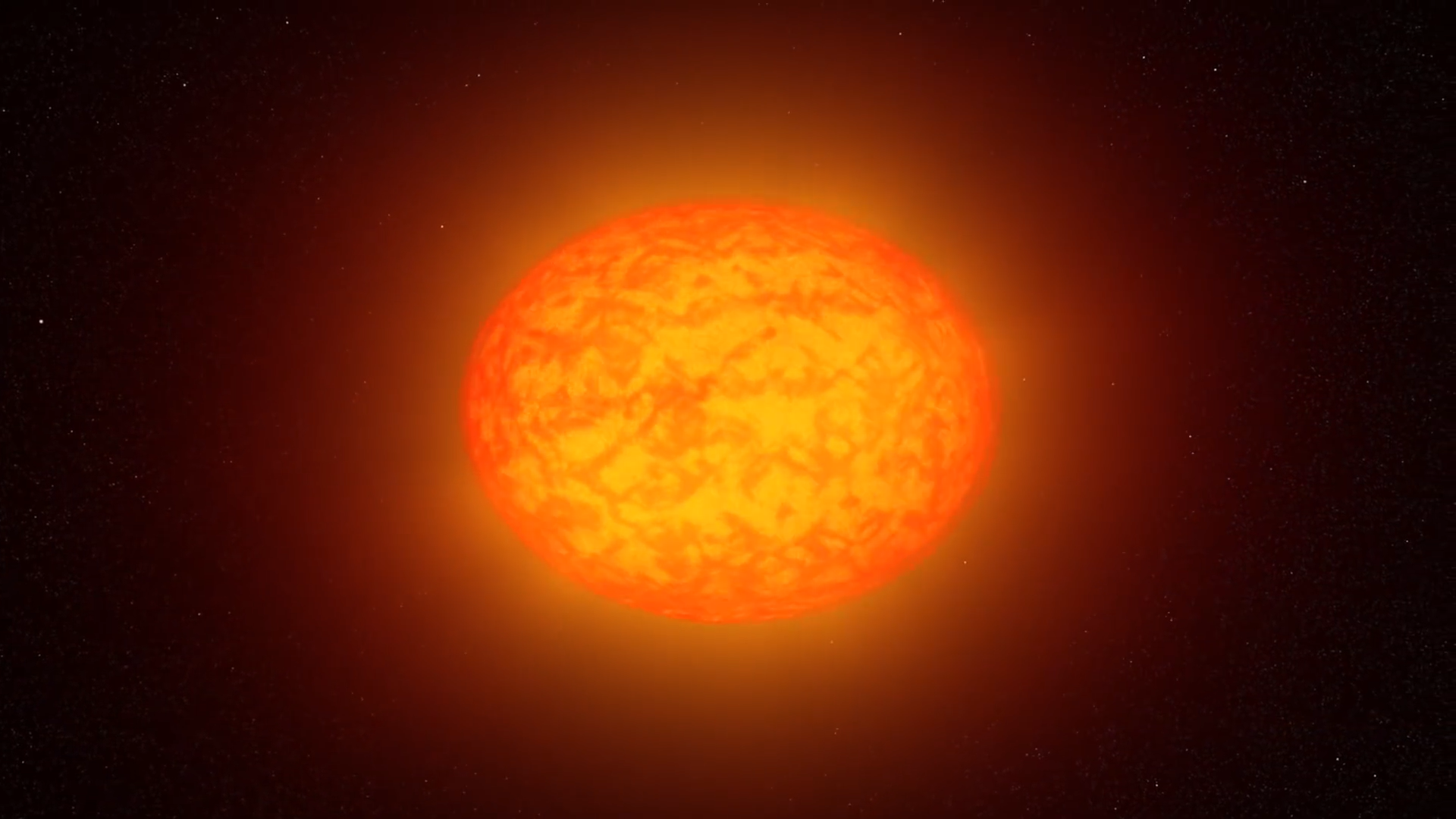
- Artist's impression of KSw 71

Observation data Epoch J2000 Equinox ICRS
- Constellation: Lyra
- Right ascension: 19^{h} 14^{m} 17.2632^{s}
- Declination: +42° 36′ 31.619″

Characteristics
- Spectral type: K0-2 IV-III

Astrometry
Proper motion (μ)	RA: −0.309 mas/yr Dec.: +6.073 mas/yr
Parallax (π)	3.1267±0.0170 mas
Distance	1,043 ± 6 ly (320 ± 2 pc)

Details
Mass	0.8257 M_{☉}
Radius	10.5 R_{☉}
Surface gravity (log g)	4.38 cgs
Temperature	4,967 K
Rotation	5.22 days
Rotational velocity (v sin i)	98.6 – 116 km/s

Other designations
- 2MASS J19141726+4236315, KIC 7107762

Database references
SIMBAD	data
KIC	data

KSw 71 is a rapidly-spinning star in the constellation of Lyra. It is thought to have formed after two stars in a close binary system merged; its rotation has deformed it into an oblate spheroid shape. KSw 71 was discovered, alongside other pumpkin-shaped stars by NASA's Kepler and Swift missions and produces X-rays at more than 100 times the peak levels ever seen from the Sun.

18 "pumpkin stars" have been discovered, including this one.
