= KIC 9832227 =

Contact binary star system

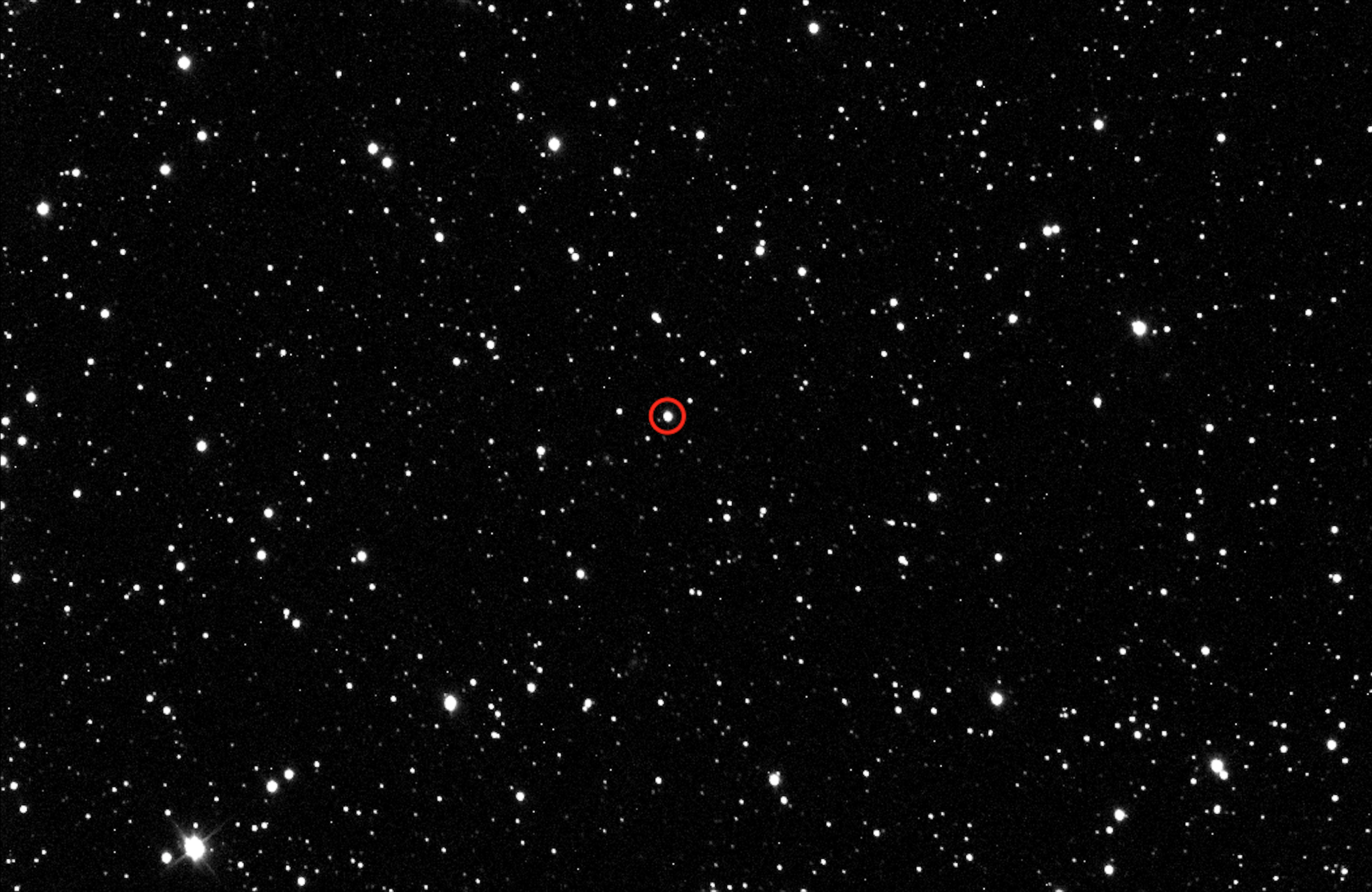
- KIC 9832227 (circled)

Observation data Epoch J2000 Equinox J2000
- Constellation: Cygnus
- Right ascension: 19^{h} 29^{m} 15.950^{s}
- Declination: +46° 37′ 19.86″
- Apparent magnitude (V): 12.27 – 12.46

Characteristics
- Spectral type: G0 V
- Variable type: Eclipsing

Astrometry
Proper motion (μ)	RA: −9.505 mas/yr Dec.: −5.718 mas/yr
Parallax (π)	1.5798±0.0134 mas
Distance	2,060 ± 20 ly (633 ± 5 pc)

Orbit
Period (P)	0.4282579 days
Semi-major axis (a)	2.992 R_{☉}
Inclination (i)	53.2°
Periastron epoch (T)	2455688.49913

Details

A
Mass	1.395 M_{☉}
Radius	1.581 R_{☉}
Luminosity	2.609 L_{☉}
Surface gravity (log g)	4.19 cgs
Temperature	5800 K
Rotational velocity (v sin i)	149.7 km/s

B
Mass	0.318 M_{☉}
Radius	0.830 R_{☉}
Luminosity	0.789 L_{☉}
Surface gravity (log g)	4.10 cgs
Temperature	5920 K
Rotational velocity (v sin i)	84.7 km/s

Other designations
- 2MASS J19291594+4637198, KIC 9832227, ASAS J192916+4637.3, GSC 03543-01211

Database references
SIMBAD	data
KIC	data

KIC 9832227 is a contact binary star system in the constellation Cygnus, located about 2,060 light-years away. It is also identified as an eclipsing binary with an orbital period of almost 11 hours.

== Incorrect 2022 merger prediction ==
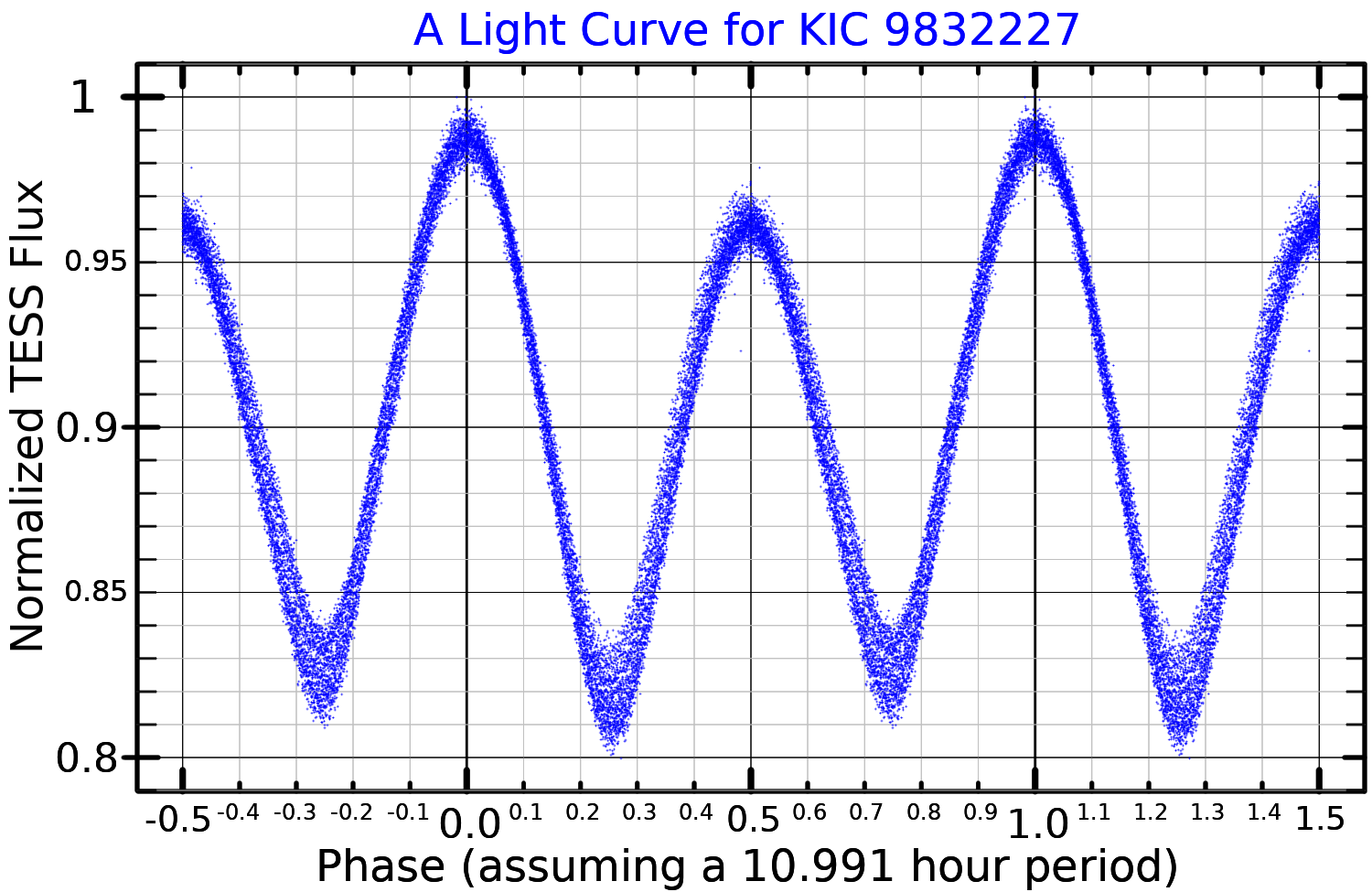
A light curve for KIC 9832227, plotted from TESS data

In 2017, the system was predicted to result in a merger in 2022.2 (± 0.6 years), producing a luminous red nova (LRN) reaching an apparent magnitude of 2, or about the brightness of Polaris, the North Star. The LRN would remain visible to the naked eye for roughly a month. The merger of the two stellar cores was predicted to give birth to a new, hotter, more massive main-sequence star. However, a reanalysis of the data in September 2018 revealed that the prediction had been based on a wrongly timed observation, negating the predicted merger.

The period of the variations in KIC 9832227 has been observed to be growing shorter since 2013, leading to the prediction of the merger in or around 2022. In September 2018, it was announced that the original prediction was based on a dataset which timing had been erroneously offset by 12 hours—an error which appeared to exaggerate the decay rate of the orbital period. Correcting for the error shows that the period had actually been increasing up to about 2008. The cause for the period variation is still unknown, but it was determined the system would not be merging at the predicted time.
