= MY Camelopardalis =

Binary star system in the constellation Camelopardalis

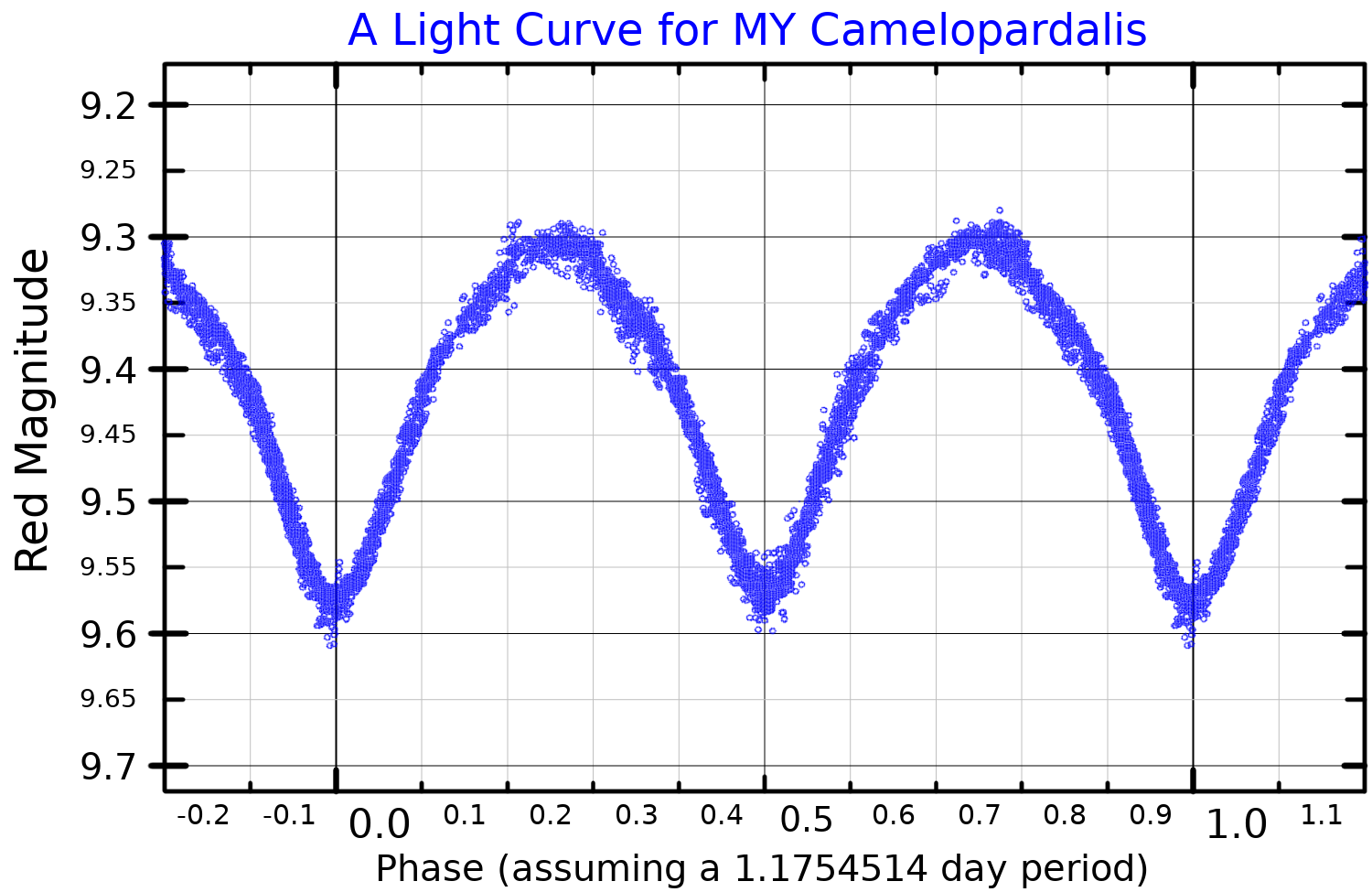
- A red band light curve for MY Camelopardalis, adapted from Lorenzo et al. (2014)

Observation data Epoch J2000.0 Equinox ICRS
- Constellation: Camelopardalis
- Right ascension: 03^{h} 59^{m} 18.2863^{s}
- Declination: +57° 14′ 13.673″
- Apparent magnitude (V): 9.80 - 10.15

Characteristics
- Spectral type: O6nn (O6V((f)) + O6V((f)))
- U−B color index: −0.66
- B−V color index: +0.28
- Variable type: Ellipsoidal

Astrometry
Radial velocity (R_{v})	−47 km/s
Proper motion (μ)	RA: −2.3 mas/yr Dec.: −0.3 mas/yr
Parallax (π)	0.1333±0.0789 mas
Distance	~4,000 pc
Absolute magnitude (M_{V})	−4.1

Orbit
Period (P)	1.175 days
Semi-major axis (a)	19.24 R_{☉}
Eccentricity (e)	0
Inclination (i)	62.59°
Argument of periastron (ω) (secondary)	90°
Argument of periastron (ω) (primary)	270°
Semi-amplitude (K_{1}) (primary)	335 km/s
Semi-amplitude (K_{2}) (secondary)	400 km/s

Details

A
Mass	37.7 M_{☉}
Radius	7.60 R_{☉}
Surface gravity (log g)	4.251 cgs
Temperature	42,000 ± 1,500 K
Rotational velocity (v sin i)	290 km/s

B
Mass	31.6 M_{☉}
Radius	7.01 R_{☉}
Surface gravity (log g)	4.245 cgs
Temperature	39,000 ± 1,500 K
Rotational velocity (v sin i)	268 km/s

Other designations
- MY Camelopardalis, BD+56°864, Alicante 1 NM 693, 2MASS J03591829+5714137, Gaia DR2 469715181320008960, TYC 3725-498-1

Database references
SIMBAD	data

MY Camelopardalis (MY Cam) is a binary star system located in the Alicante 1 open cluster, some 13 kly (4.0 kpc) away in the constellation Camelopardalis. It is one of the most massive known binary star systems and a leading candidate for a massive star merger. MY Cam is the brightest star in Alicante 1.

Artist's impression of MY Camelopardalis

The system consists of two hot blue O-type stars with one component having a mass of 32 solar masses and the other 38 solar masses.

In 1998, the star was included in a list of suspected variable stars. John Greaves and Patrick Wils proved that it is variable, in 2004. It was given its variable star designation, MY Camelopardalis, in 2008. MY Cam is a contact binary and eclipsing binary, with an orbital period of 1.2 days, and an orbital velocity of 1,000,000 km/h (280 km/s; 620,000 mph). Both stars share a common envelope.
