= NGC 6106 =

Galaxy in the constellation Hercules

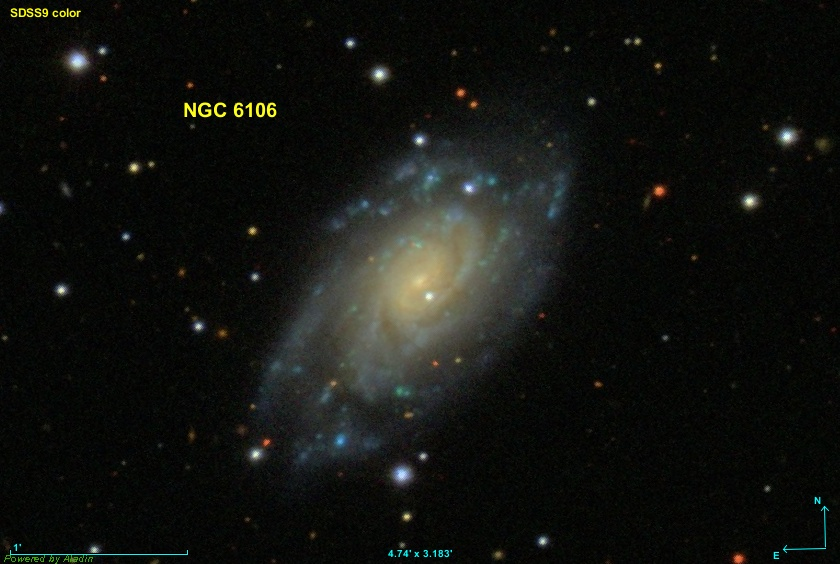
- NGC 6106 imaged by Sloan Digital Sky Survey

Observation data (J2000 epoch)
- Constellation: Hercules
- Right ascension: 16^{h} 18^{m} 47.1712^{s}
- Declination: +07° 24′ 39.319″
- Redshift: 0.004833±0.000002
- Heliocentric radial velocity: 1,449±1 km/s
- Distance: 72.64 ± 2.49 Mly (22.272 ± 0.764 Mpc)
- Apparent magnitude (V): 12.84

Characteristics
- Type: SA(s)c
- Size: ~55,600 ly (17.04 kpc) (estimated)
- Apparent size (V): 2.5′ × 1.4′

Other designations
- IRAS 16163+0731, 2MASX J16184720+0724396, UGC 10328, MCG +01-41-016, PGC 57799, CGCG 052-001

NGC 6106 is a spiral galaxy in the constellation of Hercules. Its velocity with respect to the cosmic microwave background is 1,527±6 km/s, which corresponds to a Hubble distance of 73.5 ± 5.2 Mly (22.52 ± 1.58 Mpc). This is in good agreement with 29 non-redshift measurements which give an average distance of 72.64 ± 2.49 Mly (22.272 ± 0.764 Mpc). It was discovered by German-British astronomer William Herschel on 13 April 1784.

NGC 6106 has a possible active galactic nucleus, i.e. it has a compact region at the center of a galaxy that emits a significant amount of energy across the electromagnetic spectrum, with characteristics indicating that this luminosity is not produced by the stars.

== Luminous red nova and supernova ==
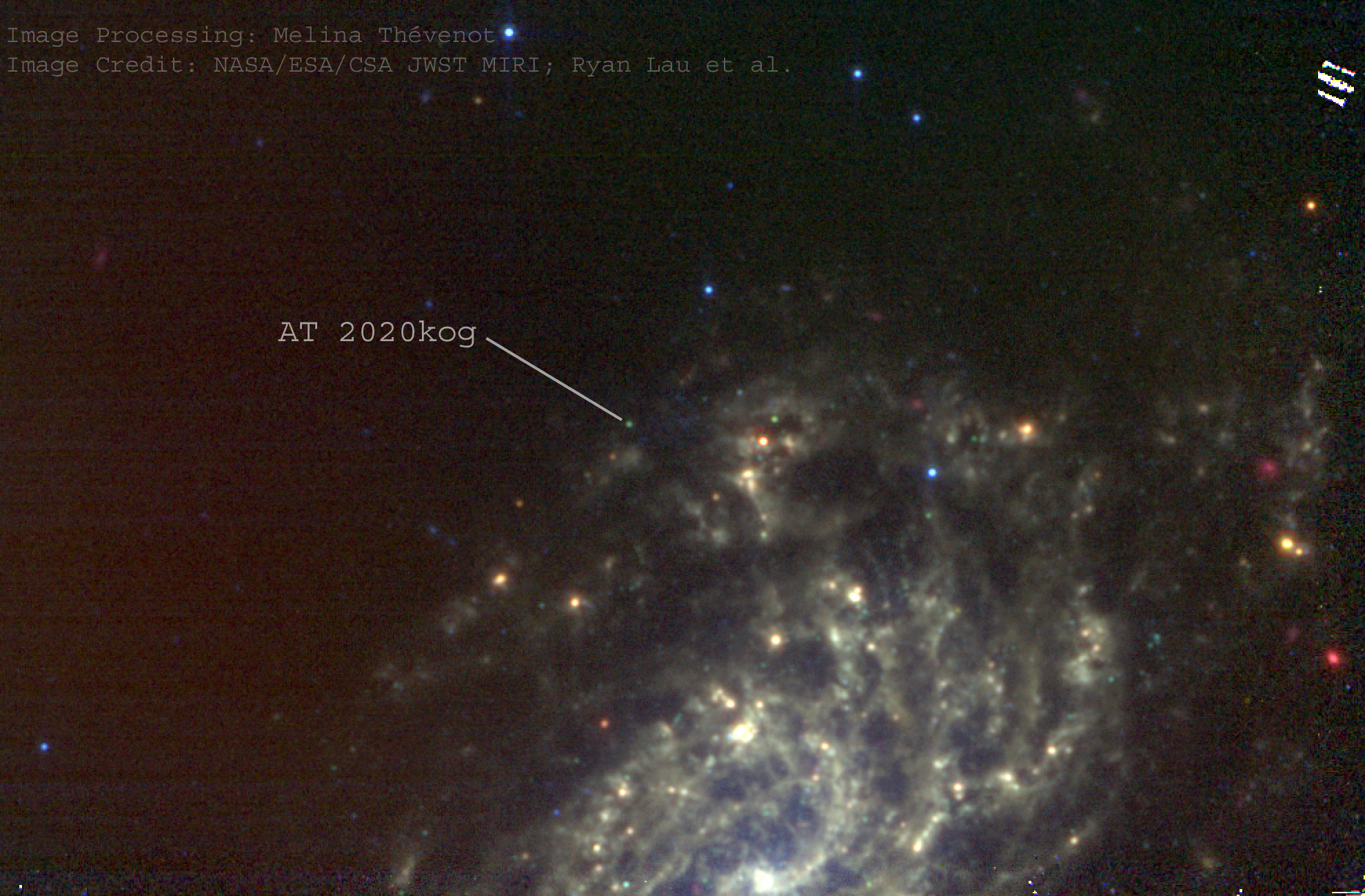
The luminous red nova AT 2020kog imaged by the James Webb Space Telescope's MIRI

One luminous red nova and one supernova have been observed in NGC 6106:

- AT 2020kog (type LRN, mag. 20.3) was discovered by Panoramic Survey Telescope and Rapid Response System (Pan-STARRS) Search for Kilonovae on 18 May 2020.
- SN 2024ahv (Type Ib, mag. 16.2) was discovered by Japanese astronomer Hidehiko Okoshi on 16 January 2024.

== See also ==
- List of NGC objects (6001–7000)
