= AFGL 4106 =

Binary star in the constellation Carina

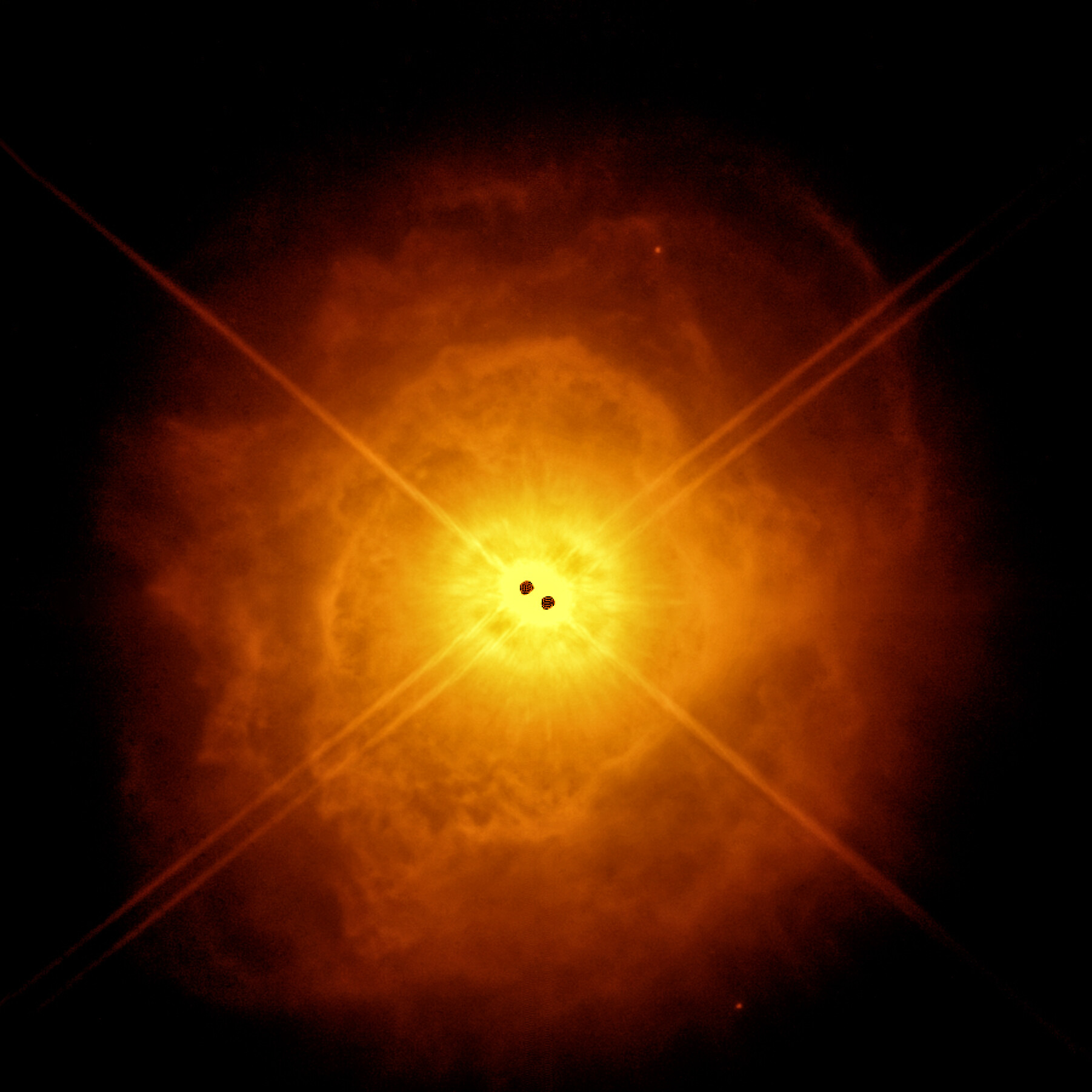
- ESO VLT/SPHERE image of AFGL 4106; Credit: ESO/G. Tomassini et al.

Observation data Epoch J2000 Equinox ICRS
- Constellation: Carina
- Right ascension: 10^{h} 23^{m} 19.48^{s}
- Declination: −59° 32′ 04.6″
- Apparent magnitude (V): 8.52 - 9.1

Characteristics
- Apparent magnitude (B): 10.59±0.06
- Apparent magnitude (G): 8.125±0.005
- Apparent magnitude (J): 4.406±0.200
- Apparent magnitude (H): 3.432±0.208
- Apparent magnitude (K): 2.970±0.236
- Variable type: LC

Primary
- Evolutionary stage: Post-red supergiant
- Spectral type: A7Ie–F0:I

Secondary
- Evolutionary stage: Red supergiant
- Spectral type: M0:I

Astrometry
Radial velocity (R_{v})	−6.63±2.27 km/s
Proper motion (μ)	RA: −6.676±0.340 mas/yr Dec.: −1.455±0.350 mas/yr
Parallax (π)	1.0611±0.297 mas
Distance	approx. 3,100 ly (approx. 900 pc)

Details

Primary
Mass	14.5 M_{☉}
Radius	209±12 R_{☉}
Luminosity	79,000±1,800 L_{☉}
Temperature	6,723±196 K
Age	13.8 or ≲2-3 Myr

Secondary
Mass	8.7 M_{☉}
Radius	567±99 R_{☉}
Luminosity	38000±1100 L_{☉}
Temperature	3,394±264 K
Age	30 or ≲2-3 Myr

Other designations
- AFGL 4106, RAFGL 4106, HD 302821, CD-58 3221, CPD-58 2154, GLMP 275, GSC 08612-00531, IRAS 10215-5916, PPM 769227, TYC 8612-531-1, UCAC2 5544670, UCAC4 153-046024

Database references
SIMBAD	data

AFGL 4106 (also known as HD 302821) is a binary star system located in the constellation of Carina. The system consists of two stars; an M-type red supergiant star, and a smaller, more evolved F-type post-red supergiant. The system is also surrounded by a large circumstellar envelope of 208 AU.

== Observational history ==
AFGL 4106 was first observed in 1986 by IRAS. It and its dust envelope was first characterised in 1999, in which it was discovered to be a binary star and was later characterised in 2025 by the Very Large Telescope.

== Distance ==
A distance of 940±260 pc can be derived from the star's parallax determined by Gaia. This does however include a significant amount of astrometric noise and is therefore likely unreliable. Using a probabilistic method to reduce noise results in a distance of 1470+590
−400 pc. Both are inconsistent with the distance of the apparently nearby Carina Nebula, where the star system was initially thought to have originated from and is at a distance of 2610 pc, unless when comparing its E(B-V) of 1.07±0.2, derived from previous observations and Gaia spectroscopy, to Gaia-2MASS maps of interstellar dust which results in a distance of 3190+450
−190 pc.

== Star system ==
AFGL 4106 contains two supergiants in different stages of evolution. The primary, an A-F type supergiant, has passed its red supergiant phase, whereas the secondary is an active red supergiant. They have a separation of 865±102 AU and complete an orbit once every ~4500 days.

=== Primary and secondary ===
The primary is a post-red supergiant with an initial mass of approximately 15 M_{☉} and an effective temperature of 6723 K, while the secondary is less evolved and has an initial mass of ~9 M_{☉} and an effective temperature of 3394 K.

Its relative proximity and similar proper motion to Westerlund 2 indicates that the system could have formed there. While respective ages of 13.8 Myr and 30 Myr for the primary and secondary are not consistent with the 2–3 Myr age of the cluster, their ages also highly differ, which instead indicates an unusual evolutionary pathway due to binary interaction. This may however not apply to the primary due to the large separation but could still be plausible if a close third companion had interacted with the system or if there had been a merger.

AFGL 4106 was first thought to have formed in the Carina Nebula due to its apparent proximity of 2.1°. This is also consistent with their distances being similar, however, this also applies to Westerlund 2, which has an apparent distance of 1.8° and a distance of 4130 pc. Comparing their proper motions with that of the star system shows that it would have likely formed in Westerlund 2.

=== Possible third companion ===
A third companion has not yet been detected but may explain estimates of the primary and secondary's large age difference and difference with the age of the nearby Westerlund 2 without requiring new stellar evolutionary models. It could also have explained the apparent oscillations derived from variations in the ellipticity of the surrounding ejecta, however, to match observations, the star would orbit near enough that the total system mass would have to be 1700 M_{☉}, which is not possible.

== Nebula ==
The surrounding nebula shows a highly complex morphology, which is attributed to influence from the companion star and a complex ejection mechanism.

It is also elliptical, with an eccentricity of 0.5, and the semi-minor axis of the nebula is aligned with the proper motion of the star system which indicates deceleration by the interstellar medium.

== See also ==
- VV Cephei
- Antares
- Betelgeuse
- VFTS 352
- Rigel
- WOH G64
