= ZTF SLRN-2020 =

Nova event of a planet engulfed by a star

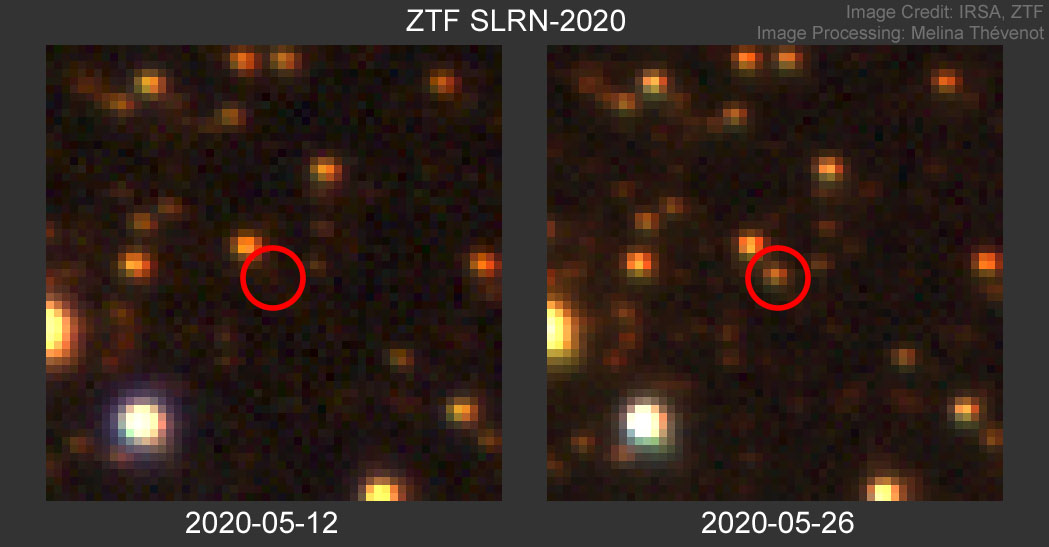
- ZTF SLRN-2020 with ZTF before detection (left) and near the peak (right)
- Event type: Red nova
- Date: discovery: 17 May 2020 i-band peak: 24 May 2020 (MJD 58993)
- Duration: optical: 6 months mid-infrared: 15 months
- Constellation: Aquila
- Right ascension: 19^{h} 09^{m} 39.7830^{s}
- Declination: +05° 35′ 04.269″
- Distance: 4 kiloparsecs (13,000 ly)
- Other designations: ZTF 20aazusyv
- Related media on Commons

ZTF SLRN-2020 also called ZTF 20aazusyv is a subluminous red nova (SLRN) event that is the result of the engulfment of an exoplanet into a star. It was the third planet engulfment observed, and the first one in an older age star. The engulfed planet was either a hot Jupiter or a hot Neptune with a mass of ≲10 M_{J}.

ZTF SLRN-2020 was discovered with the Zwicky Transient Facility as an optical outburst that lasted 6 months. The outburst was accompanied by a mid-infrared brightening discovered with NEOWISE that began 7 months before the optical outburst. No x-ray emission was detected. At first it was suspected the star was engulfing the planet and initially it was suspected that the star is an M giant from molecular absorption features. Later observations with JWST did find the star more likely to be a 0.7 M_{☉} K-type star that did not evolve away from the main-sequence. The researchers suggest that the planet was engulfed due to orbital decay and not due to the expansion of the star. This follow-up observation also detected emission from circumstellar dust, as well as emission of carbon monoxide and by hydrogen (Br-α). The observations also potentially detect phosphine emission, which also exists in the atmosphere of giant planets and some brown dwarfs. The circumstellar dust has two components, a warmer (~700 K) and a colder component (~300 K). It was suggested that the planet accreted mass from the star and launched some of this mass away in jets. As the planet orbited closer to the star, the star removed the accreted mass and formed a disk around the star and launched jets. This could form a bipolar nebula in the future, similar to other red novae.
