= Ou 5 =

Planetary nebula in the constellation Cygnus

Emission nebula
- Planetary nebula
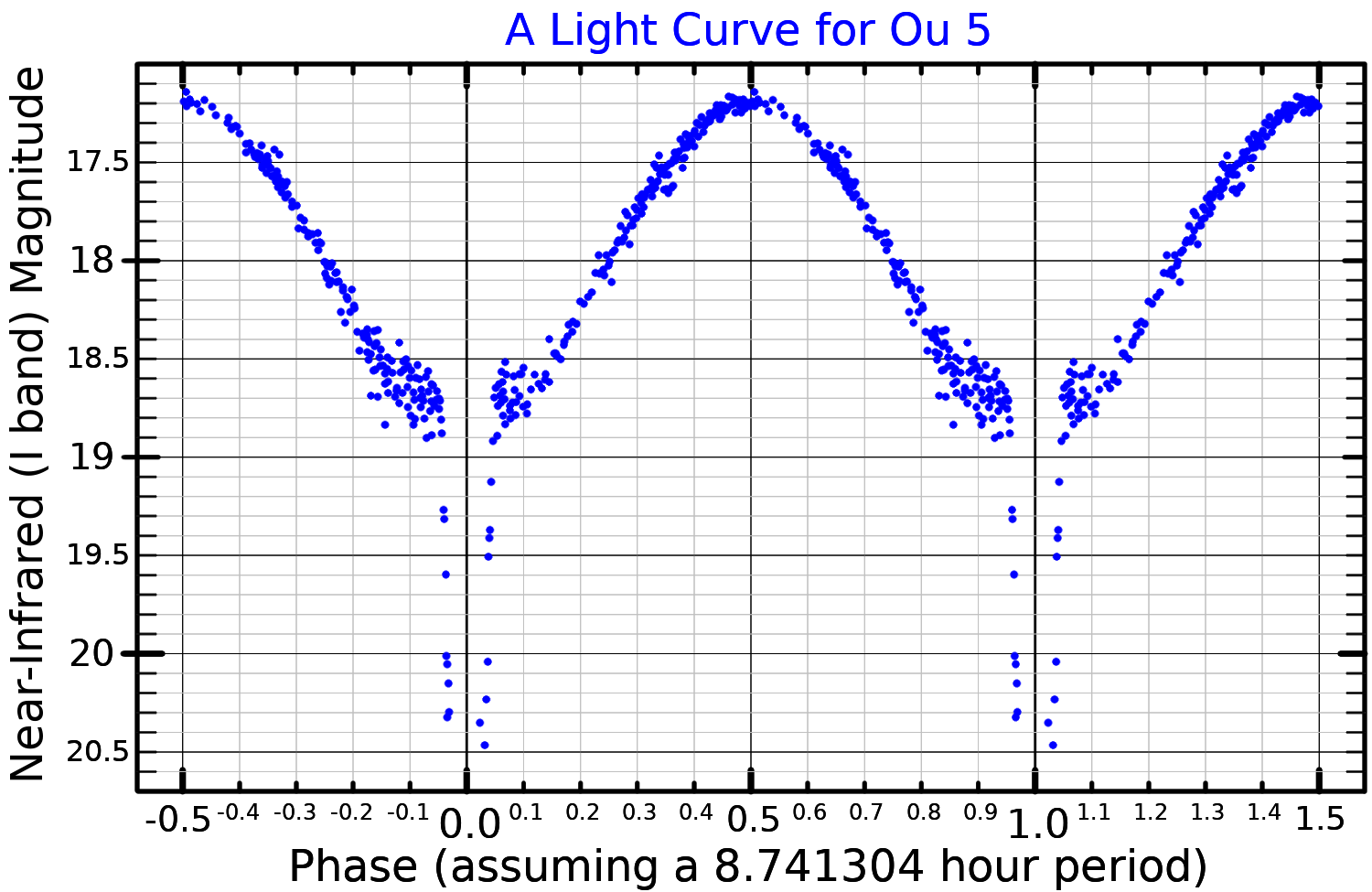
- A near-infrared (I band) light curve for Ou 5, adapted from Corradi et al. (2014)

Observation data: J2000 epoch
- Right ascension: 21^{h} 14^{m} 20.03^{s}
- Declination: +43° 41′ 36.00″
- Distance: 3,100 ± 300 pc
- Apparent dimensions (V): 0.6 × 0.8 arcmin
- Constellation: Cygnus
- Designations: IPHASXJ211420.0+434136, PN G086.9-03

Ou 5, also known as IPHASXJ211420.0+434136, is a planetary nebula in the constellation of Cygnus. It was discovered by the IPHAS project in data taken on August 1, 2010, and independently by the French amateur astronomer Nicolas Outters in September 2012. Located two degrees east of the North America Nebula, it is an unusual planetary nebula because its central star is a short period eclipsing binary.

Ou 5 showed signs of variability during the three occasions when IPHAS observed it. Because of that, members of the IPHAS team made follow-up photometric observations of the nebula during October and November 2013, using the 80 cm IAC80 telescope at the Teide Observatory. The derived light curve showed that the central star was an eclipsing binary, and the short orbital period (8.7 hours) implies that during the red giant phase which preceded the formation of the planetary nebula, the stars must have formed a common envelope binary. Passing through a common envelope stage is often invoked as an explanation for the bipolar shape seen in many planetary nebulae, and Ou 5 does have bipolar features. The structure of the barrel-shaped nebula suggests that there may have been multiple mass ejection events during the common envelope phase.

The eclipses of the compact primary star in Ou 5 allow spectra of the fainter secondary star to be obtained. They indicate that the secondary star is a late K or early M-type star. The masses of the hot primary and cool secondary stars are estimated to be 0.50 M_{☉}, and 0.23 M_{☉} respectively.
