= V4332 Sagittarii =

Nova-like event in the constellation of Sagittarius

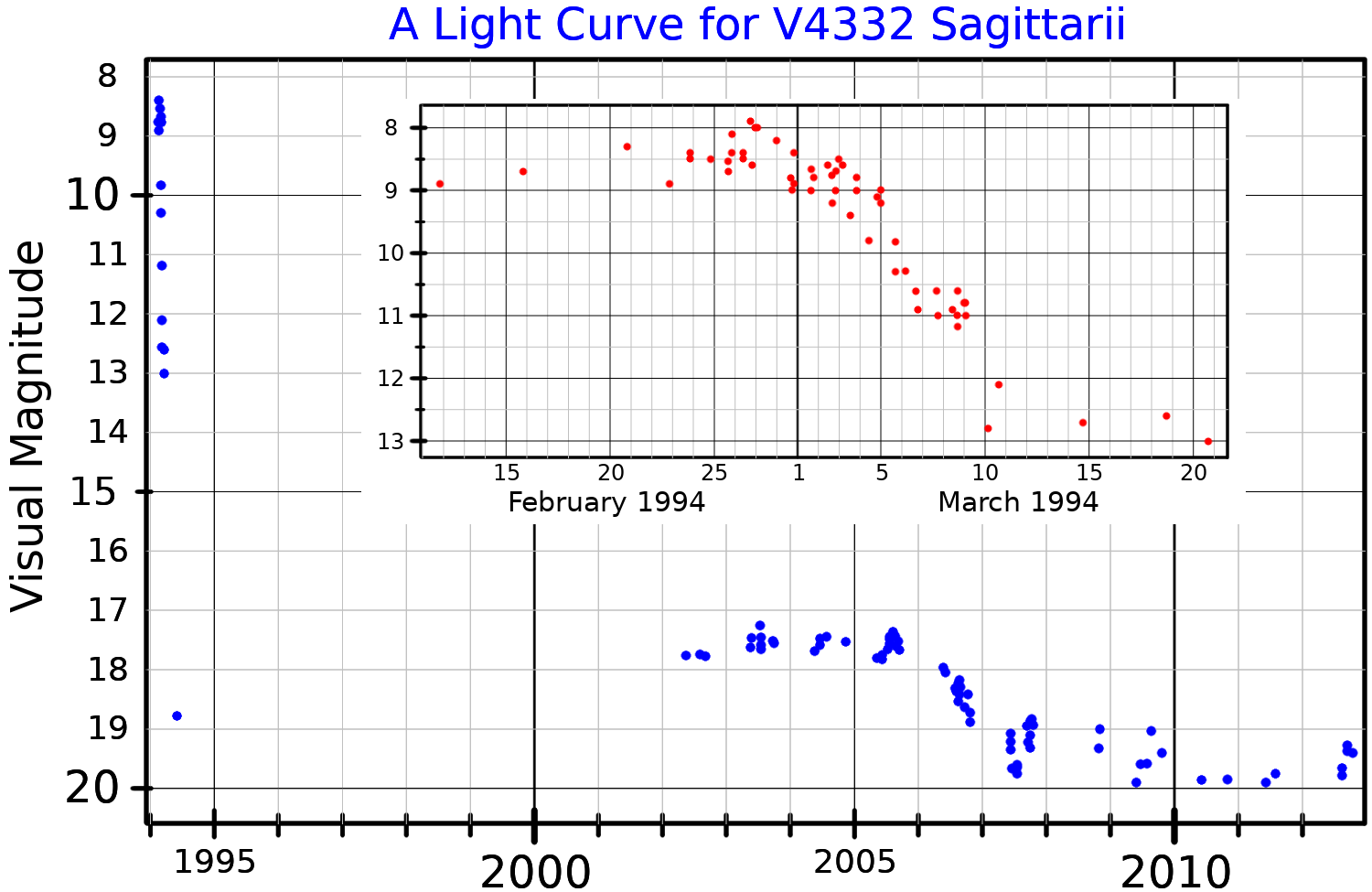
- A visual band light curve for V4332 Sagittarii. The main plot, adapted from Tylenda et al. (2015), shows the long-term variability, and the inset, adapted from Martini et al. (1999), shows the variation during the first weeks of the eruption.

Observation data Epoch J2000.0 Equinox ICRS
- Constellation: Sagittarius
- Right ascension: 18^{h} 50^{m} 36.696^{s}
- Declination: –21° 23′ 28.93″
- Apparent magnitude (V): 8.5

Characteristics
- Spectral type: K8/M0e

Astrometry
Proper motion (μ)	RA: −2.722 mas/yr Dec.: −5.555 mas/yr
Parallax (π)	0.0017±0.2798 mas
Distance	(3.71±3.3)×10^{3} ly

Other designations
- V4332 Sgr, Nova Sgr 1994

Database references
SIMBAD	data

V4332 Sagittarii is a nova-like event in the constellation of Sagittarius. It was discovered on February 24, 1994 at an apparent visual magnitude of 8.9 by Japanese amateur astronomer Minoru Yamamoto from Okazaki, Aichi, then confirmed by K. Hirosawa. Initially designated Nova Sagittarii 1994 #1, it was given the variable star designation V4332 Sgr. A spectra of the event taken on March 4 lacked the characteristic features of a classical nova, with the only emission lines being of the Balmer series. Subsequent spectra showed a rapid decline in luminosity and a change of spectral type over a period of five days. By 2003, the object was ~1500 times less luminous than at peak magnitude and showed a spectrum of an M-type star.

The nova-like event V838 Mon and this outburst formed an unusual category of erupting stars. In 2003, N. Soker and R. Tylenda proposed an accretion scenario as an explanation. They noted that a merger of two main sequence stars in a close binary orbit could explain the observed properties, a process now known as a luminous red nova. In this scenario, the decline in brightness and radius of V4332 Sgr was a consequence of the merged stellar envelope undergoing gravitational contraction.

An infrared excess from the object suggests it has a circumstellar disk. The infrared spectrum of this feature showed an absorption band of water ice and a carbon monoxide emission band. By 2010, the stellar component had become concealed by a dusty disk viewed edge-on. This dust includes a significant component of alumina, with growing amounts of magnesia and iron oxide.

The site of the nova also developed a bipolar outflow, seen in both ALMA and Hubble observations.

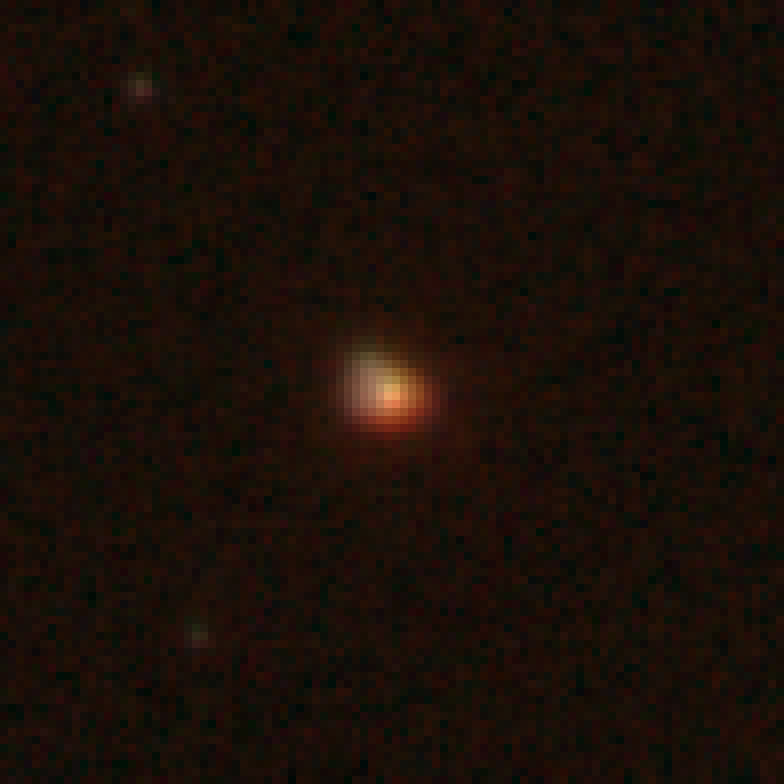
Hubble observation of the outflow around V4332 Sagittarii in November 2014

== See also ==
- V1309 Scorpii
