= VFTS 352 =

Contact binary star system in the constellation Dorado

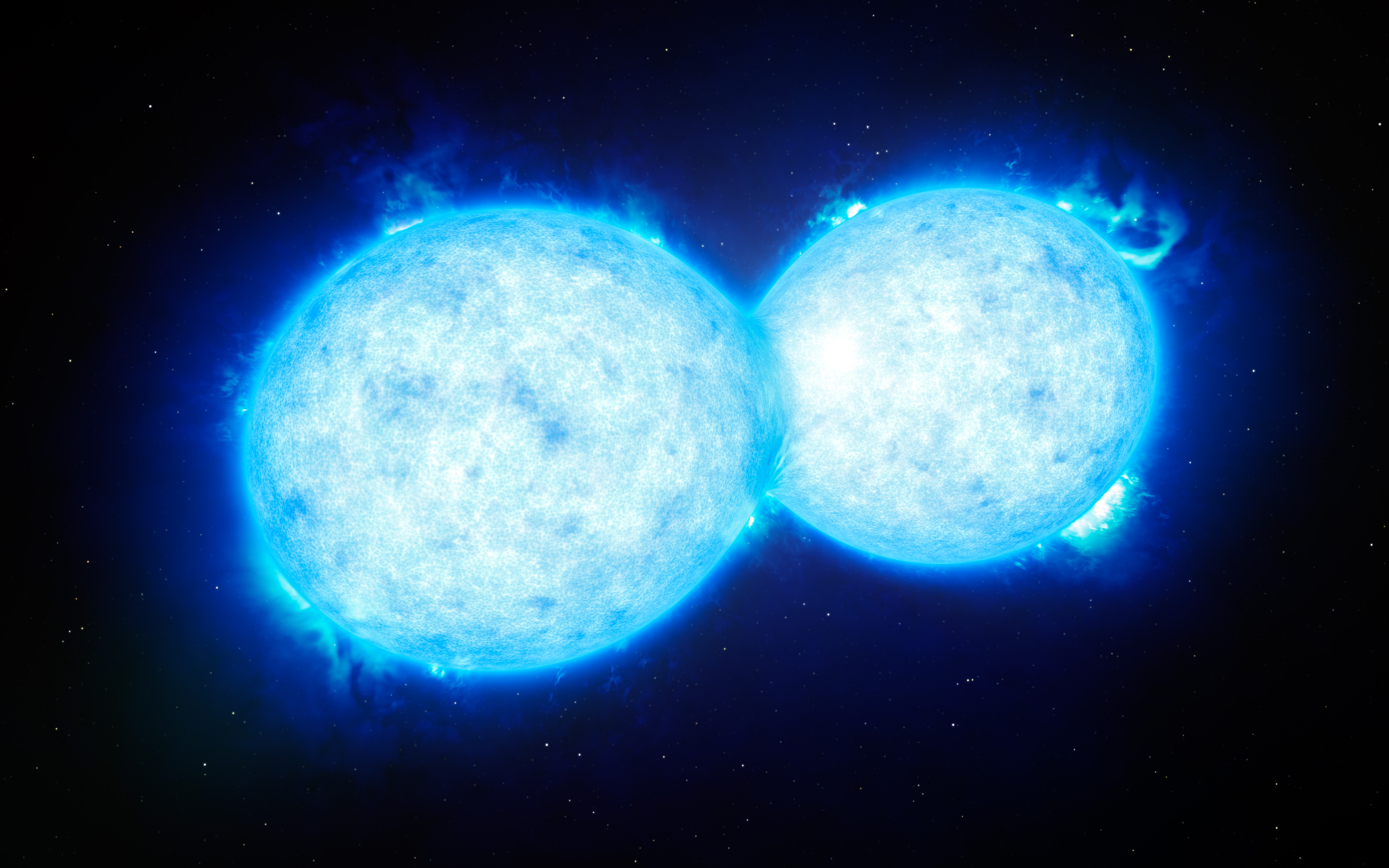
- Artist's rendering of VFTS 352 binary star Credit: ESO/L. Calçada

Observation data Epoch J2000 Equinox ICRS
- Constellation: Dorado
- Right ascension: 05^{h} 38^{m} 28.456^{s}
- Declination: −69° 11′ 19.18″
- Apparent magnitude (V): 14.38

Characteristics
- Evolutionary stage: Main sequence + main sequence
- Spectral type: O4.5 V(n)((fc)):z: + O5.5 V(n)((fc)):z:
- B−V color index: −0.10

Astrometry
Radial velocity (R_{v})	262.8 km/s
Distance	164,000 ly (50,000 pc)

Orbit
Primary	VFTS 352_{1}
Name	VFTS 352_{2}
Period (P)	1.124 days
Semi-major axis (a)	17.55 R_{☉}
Eccentricity (e)	0
Inclination (i)	55.60°
Semi-amplitude (K_{1}) (primary)	324.9 km/s
Semi-amplitude (K_{2}) (secondary)	315.6 km/s

Details

VFTS 352_{1}
Mass	28.63±0.30 M_{☉}
Radius	7.22±0.02 R_{☉}
Luminosity	180,000 L_{☉}
Surface gravity (log g)	4.18±0.01 cgs
Temperature	42,540±280 K
Age	1 Myr

VFTS 352_{2}
Mass	28.85±0.30 M_{☉}
Radius	7.25±0.02 R_{☉}
Luminosity	150,000 L_{☉}
Surface gravity (log g)	4.18±0.01 cgs
Temperature	41,120±290 K
Age	1 Myr

Other designations
- VFTS 352, 2MASS J05382845-6911191, IRSF J05382846-6911192

Database references
SIMBAD	data

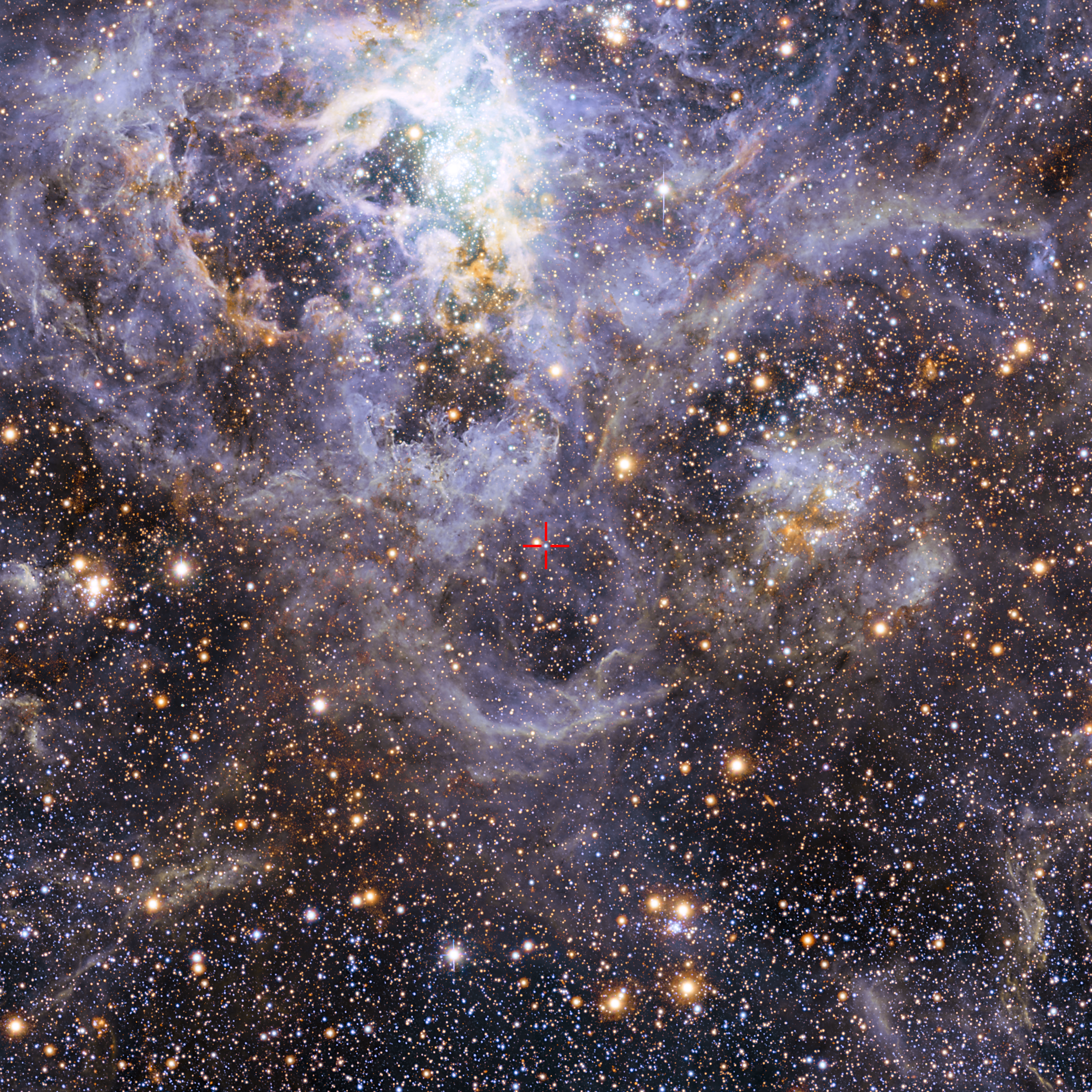
VFTS 352 is at the centre of this combined optical and infrared image of the Tarantula Nebula, marked by the red crosshairs.

VFTS 352 is a contact binary star system about 160,000 light years away in the Tarantula Nebula, which is part of the Large Magellanic Cloud. It is the most massive and earliest spectral type overcontact system known.

The discovery of this O-type binary star system made use of the European Southern Observatory's Very Large Telescope, and the description was published on 13 October 2015. VFTS 352 is composed of two massive stars of almost equal size that orbit each other in less than 27 hours. Both are extremely hot and luminous and are so close that their atmospheres overlap. The two stars are rotating at a rate equal to their orbital period; that is, they are tidally locked.

Massive stars like the two components of VFTS 352 are the primary source of oxygen in the universe, produced in their interiors via the CNO cycle and then released to the interstellar environment by a supernova explosion.

The future of VFTS 352 is uncertain, and there are two possible scenarios. If the two stars merge, a very rapidly rotating star will be produced. If it keeps spinning rapidly it might end its life in a long-duration gamma-ray burst. In a second hypothetical scenario, the components would end their lives in supernova explosions, forming a close binary black hole system, hence a potential gravitational wave source through black hole–black hole merger.

== See also ==
- Contact binary (small Solar System body), two asteroids gravitating toward each other until they touch
