= M31 RV =

Possible red cataclysmic variable star in the constellation Andromeda

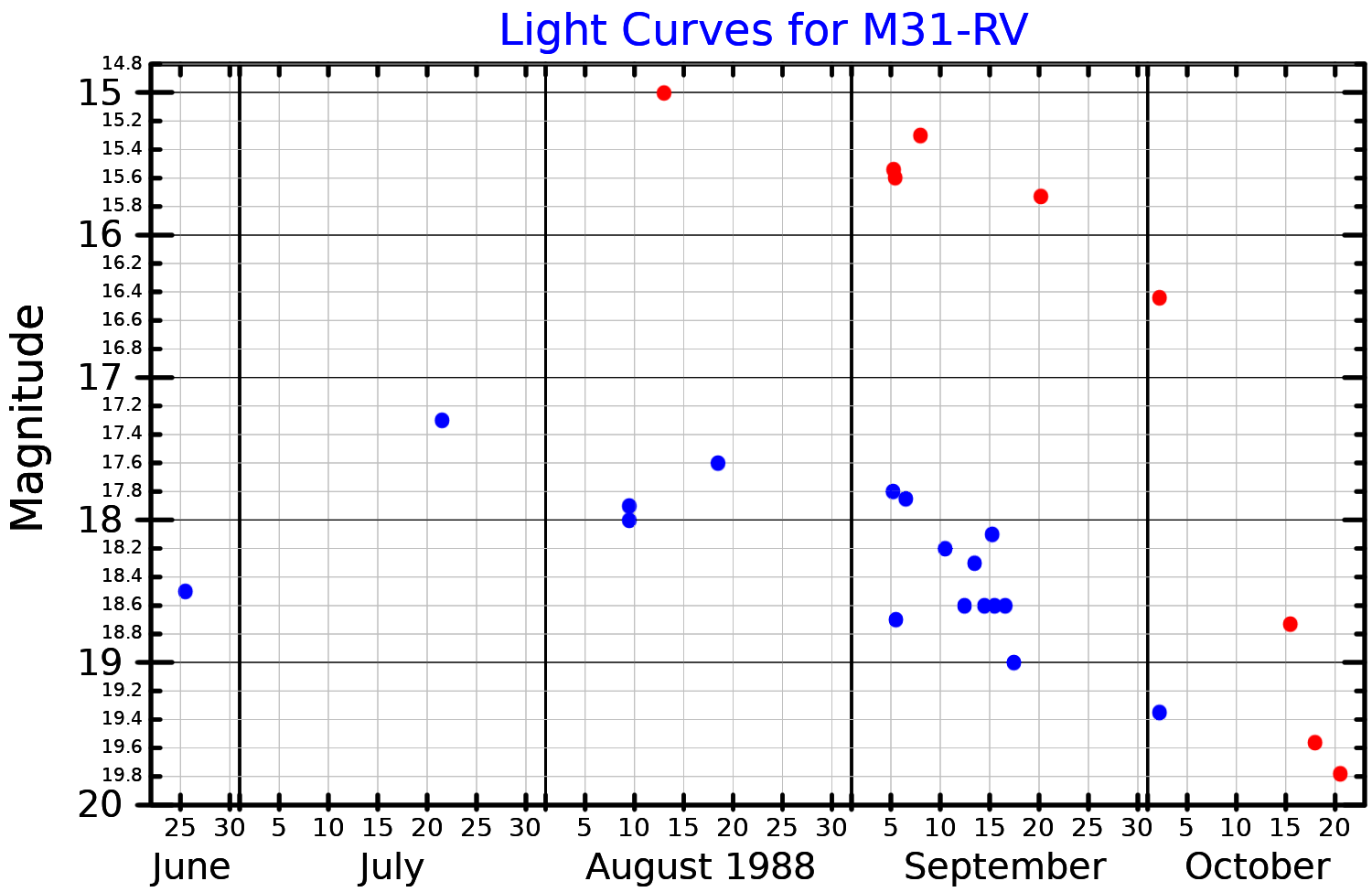
- Light curves for M31 RV, adapted from Boschi and Munari (2004). The red dots show the red band magnitude, and the blue dots show the blue band magnitude.

Observation data Epoch J2000.0 Equinox ICRS
- Constellation: Andromeda
- Right ascension: 00^{h} 43^{m} 02.433^{s}
- Declination: +41° 12′ 56.17″

Characteristics
- Evolutionary stage: M supergiant
- Spectral type: M0I-M7I
- Variable type: Luminous Red Nova

Details
Radius	2,000 during outburst R_{☉}
Luminosity	900,000 during outburst (Note: Calculated using the Stefan-Boltzmann Law using the given values for radius and temperature in the reference) L_{☉}
Temperature	4,000 during outburst K

Other designations
- M31 V1006, M31 V1007, McD 88 1

Database references
SIMBAD	data

M31 RV is a possible red cataclysmic variable star located in the Andromeda Galaxy (M31) that experienced an outburst in 1988, which was similar to the outburst V838 Monocerotis experienced in 2002. At peak brightness, M31 RV was the most luminous red supergiant in the Local Group. Such objects have been called luminous red novae or intermediate-luminosity red transients. During the outburst, both V838 Mon and M31 RV reached a maximum absolute visual magnitude of -9.8.

In 2006, the area around M31 RV was observed using the Hubble Space Telescope, but only red giants were seen. Most likely the star either became too dim for Hubble to see, the star is a companion of one of the red giants, or the star is one of the red giants themselves.

M31 RV reached a peak visual magnitude of 17 before fading rapidly and showing dust formation. The most likely explanation states that these outbursts occur during stellar merger events.

== See also ==
- AE Andromedae
