= Ruprecht 44 =

Open cluster in constellation Puppis

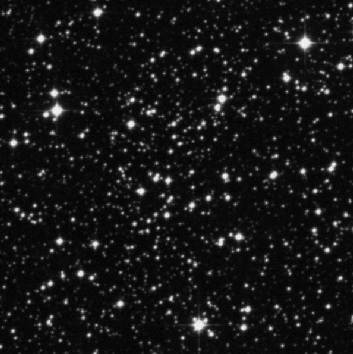

Observation data (J2000 epoch)
- Right ascension: 07^{h} 58^{m} 54.0^{s}
- Declination: −28° 35′ 00″
- Distance: 6,600 pc

Physical characteristics
- Estimated age: ~10^{6} years
- Other designations: C 0757-284, KPR2004b 176, KPS2012 MWSC 1398

Associations
- Constellation: Puppis

Ruprecht 44 is an open cluster in the Milky Way galaxy. It is about 6,600 pc away in the constellation Puppis. Ruprecht 44 is a very young open cluster, only about several million years old.

Prominent stars
Star name	LSS number	Effective temperature	Absolute magnitude	Bolometric magnitude	Mass (M_{☉})	Spectral type	Ref.
WR 10 (HD 65865)	LSS 916	63000	-4.2	-8.5	25	WN4.5	
	LSS 891	37200	-4.4	-8	27	O8III(f)	
	LSS 898	35100	-4.3	-7.7	24	Be	
	LSS 902	31600	-4.7	-7.9	23	B0V	
	LSS 920	34700	-3.7	-7.1	21	O9.5V	
	LSS 907	31600	-4.3	-7.4	20	B0V	
