= Luminous red nova =

Stellar explosion with a distinct red colour

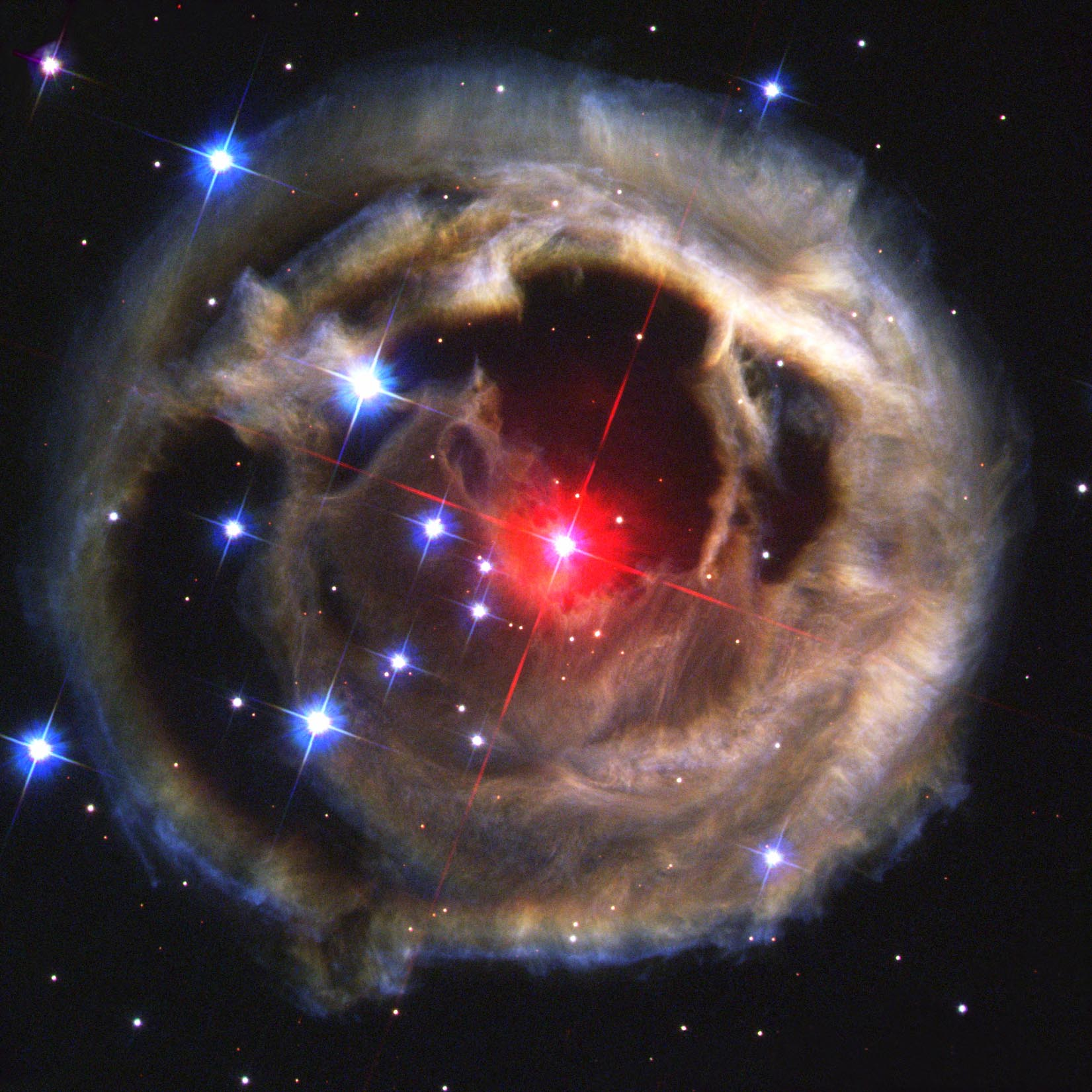
V838 Monocerotis – a possible luminous red nova

A luminous red nova (abbr. LRN, pl. luminous red novae, pl.abbr. LRNe) is a stellar explosion thought to be caused by the merging of two stars. They are characterised by a distinct red colour, and a light curve that fades slowly with resurgent brightness in the infrared. Luminous red novae are not related to standard novae, which are explosions that occur on the surface of white dwarf stars.

== Discovery ==
A small number of objects exhibiting the characteristics of luminous red novae have been observed since 1998. The red star M31 RV in the Andromeda Galaxy flared brightly during 1988 and may have been a luminous red nova. In 1994, V4332 Sagittarii, a star in the Milky Way galaxy, flared similarly, and in 2002, V838 Monocerotis followed suit and was studied quite closely.

The term luminous red nova was coined when describing the object M85 OT2006-1, which occurred in the galaxy Messier 85. It was first observed during the Lick Observatory Supernova Search, and subsequently investigated by a team of astronomers from both U.C. Berkeley and Caltech. They confirmed its difference from known explosions such as novae and thermal pulses, and announced luminous red novae as a new class of stellar explosion.

V1309 Scorpii is a luminous red nova that followed the merger of a contact binary in 2008. In January 2015, a luminous red nova was observed in the Andromeda Galaxy. On February 10, 2015, a luminous red nova, known as M101 OT2015-1 was discovered in the Pinwheel Galaxy (M101).

ZTF SLRN-2020 is a subluminous red nova that involved the engulfment of a planet. These events are rare and between 0.1 and several should occur in the Milky Way per year.

In addition to these novae, AT 2020nqq (type ILRT, mag. 17.8), was discovered on 27 June 2020 in the Centaurus A galaxy.

== Characteristics ==
The luminosity of the explosion occurring in luminous red novae is between that of a supernova (which is brighter) and a nova (dimmer), and thus a type of Intermediate luminosity optical transient. The visible light lasts for weeks or months, and is distinctively red in colour, becoming dimmer and redder over time. They have a long, slow luminosity rise before the outburst, with the event itself often having two or more peaks, with the second peak sometimes plateauing. As the visible light dims, the infrared light grows and also lasts for an extended period of time, usually dimming and brightening a number of times, resulting from an excess of dust produced by the explosion.

Infrared observations of M85 OT2006-1 have shown that temperature of this star is slightly less than 1000 K, a very low temperature (corresponding to the spectral type T, usually only seen in brown dwarfs). Other luminous red novae have been shown to have temperatures of around 3000 K, including V1309 Sco and OGLE-2002-BLG-360. The aftermath of the merger shows bipolar structures in several luminous red novae in the Milky Way, and many luminous red novae show a range of molecules detected both in the optical spectrum and at sub-millimetre wavelengths. Chromium Oxide (CrO) has been detected in two Galactic luminous red novae: V1309 Sco and V4332 Sgr, which is currently the only astrophysical detections of this molecule.

== Evolution ==
The team investigating M85 OT2006-1 believe it to have formed when two main sequence stars merged. (See the article on V838 Mon for further information on mergebursts and alternative possibilities.)

At the time the mergeburst occurs, the LRN appears to expand extremely rapidly, reaching thousands to tens of thousands of solar radii in only a few months. This would cause the object to cool, explaining the intriguing co-existence of a bright flash with a cool post-flash object.

== Prediction ==
In 2017 KIC 9832227, a binary star system, was predicted to merge and produce a red nova by early 2022. In September 2018, a typo was discovered in data used for the initial prediction, and it was determined that the merger would likely not take place at the predicted time.

== See also ==
- Binary star
- Cataclysmic variable star
- Dwarf nova
- Hypernova
- Nova
- Supernova
