= V1309 Scorpii =

Star in the constellation Scorpius

Observation data Epoch J2000.0 (ICRS) Equinox ICRS
- Constellation: Scorpius
- Right ascension: 17^{h} 57^{m} 32.93830^{s}
- Declination: −30° 43′ 09.96739″
- Apparent magnitude (V): 7.9 max.

Database references
SIMBAD	data

V1309 Scorpii (also known as V1309 Sco) is a contact binary that merged into a single star in 2008 in a process known as a luminous red nova. It was the first star to provide conclusive evidence that contact binary systems end their evolution in a stellar merger. Its similarities to V838 Monocerotis and V4332 Sagittarii allowed scientists to identify these stars as merged contact binaries as well.

== Discovery ==
V1309 Scorpii was discovered independently on 2 September 2008 by three groups: Koichi Nishiyama and Fujio Kabashima, Yukio Sakurai, and Guoyou Sun and Xing Gao. It was originally identified as a transient object located near the galactic bulge at right ascension 17^{h} 57^{m} 32.93^{s} ± 0^{s}.01 and declination −30° 43′ 10″ ± 0″.1. The astronomers who found it noted that it had been invisible to their 12 mag limit telescope just a few days prior to its discovery, indicating that it had recently undergone an outburst. Before its eruption, its faintness and close proximity to USNO-B1.0 star 0592-0608962 (magnitude B = 16.9 and R = 14.8) just 1.14″ away made it difficult to detect. When discovered, V1309 Scorpii was believed to be nothing more than a classical nova.

== Identification as a stellar merger ==
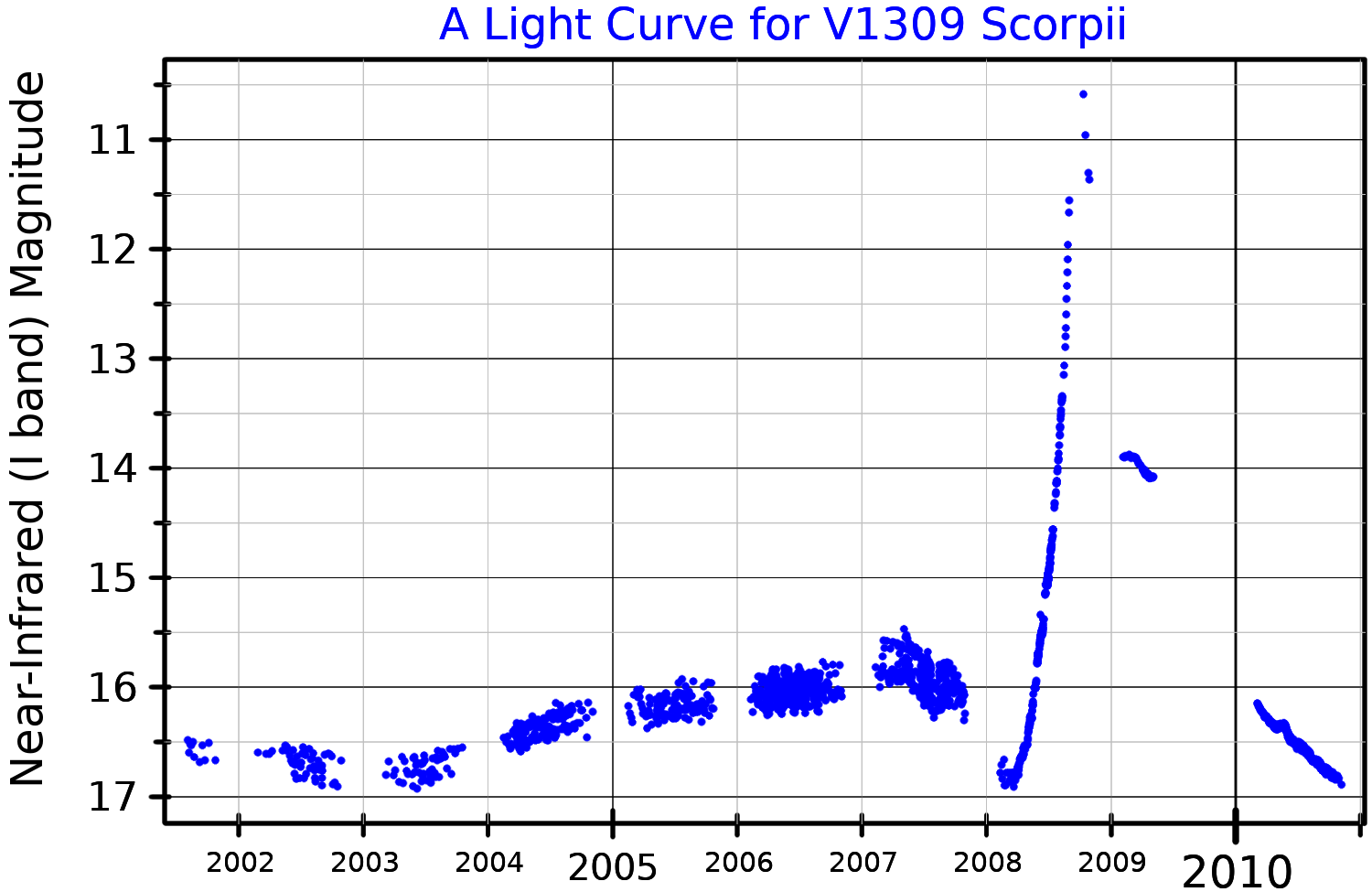
A near-infrared (I band) light curve for V1309 Scorpii, plotted from OGLE data

Immediately following its eruption, a group of astrophysicists led by Elena Mason at the European Southern Observatory conducted a study of V1309 Sco's post-outburst spectrum. Originally, the focus of this study was to analyze heavy-metal absorption patterns in a classical nova, but the authors did not realize that this was not a classical nova. In analyzing the spectrum, Mason et al. posited that V1309 Scorpii was surrounded by a slowly expanding gas shell which is denser in the equatorial plane, giving way to a narrow absorption spectrum from this dense region and a broader emission spectrum surrounding it. The incline of this equatorial plane from the observer's line of sight leaves mostly just the polar cap visible. This region would then be approaching the observer as indicated by the overall blueshift of the spectrum. Furthermore, the presence of ejecta from the polar cap at various velocities would account for the observed high velocity wings in the Balmer series. The behavior of the Hα/Hβ ratio, which decreased for a little over a month before shooting up to saturated levels and remaining high months after, was one of many spectral characteristics, also including distinct forbidden lines, that made V1309 Scorpii distinct from classical novae and more similar to red novae.

Following up on the Mason et al. study, Romuald Tylenda and colleagues, who had previous used theoretical models to support that red novae could be the result of stellar mergers, turned to investigate V1309 Scorpii. Due to its proximity to the Galactic Center, V1309 Scorpii was within the field of view of the Optical Gravitational Lensing Experiment (OGLE) telescope, which had been collecting magnitude data of V1309 Scorpii to a precision of 0.01 magnitudes for several years prior to its eruption. The star gradually grew in brightness between 2001 and 2007, before dipping just a little prior to its 2008 eruption. During this eruption, it increased in brightness by 10 mag, or by about a factor of 1×10^{4}. The star then rapidly subsided in brightness through the period spectrally observed by Mason et al. Prior to outburst, the star's magnitude had a period of around 1.4 days that decreased exponentially until the outburst. Following the model of a typical contact binary, V1309 Scorpii had two peaks in magnitude per cycle, corresponding to times when the two stars were perpendicular to the observer's line of sight. However, in its case, the second peak in each period began to gradually decrease until its light curve only showed one peak per period. This was because the secondary star began orbiting faster than the envelope of the primary star could keep up with. Because the stars are in contact, the velocity difference begins to dissipate as energy at their point of contact. Thus when the secondary star was approaching the line of sight, it appeared brighter and when it was moving away from the line of sight, it appeared fainter. By 2007, the two stars were so close to merging, that its magnitude, as measured on Earth, appeared roughly spherical, leading to the loss of the second maximum immediately prior to its outburst.

This evidence was the first of its kind to conclusively demonstrate that a contact binary star can end its evolution in a stellar merger and also gave scientists a framework within which to identify other stars as contact binaries and predict future mergers.

== Post-identification studies ==
Since the identification of V1309 Scorpii, further studies of the star have been focussed both on modelling its evolution and collecting additional spectral data.

=== Further spectral research ===
One of these follow-up studies continued Mason et al.'s 2010 spectroscopic study by analyzing the evolution of a wider spectrum on a longer time scale. In this study, Kaminsky et al. unexpectedly found a strong spectral signature from CrO in the near infrared, which was the first known discovery of CrO in a stellar spectrum. Present chemical models do not have an explanation for why red novae are the only stars to display this CrO line. This finding may also give further insight into the unexpectedly high amounts of ^{54}Cr that have been observed in the Solar System, which was recently found to not originate solely from supernovae.

=== Theoretical research ===
Understanding that contact binary stars end their lives in mergers has also spawned theoretical research. Notably, a 2015 study investigated contact binaries within globular clusters and determined that the stellar merger hypothesis may be a leading cause in the formation of blue straggler stars in these regions.

== Identifying other stellar mergers ==
As more is known about V1309 Scorpii and its progenitor than other red novae, it has been described as a "Rosetta Stone" in our understanding of stellar mergers that can help to identify other nova as stellar mergers. For example, data on V1309 Scorpii has already been used to try to explain the mysterious outburst of CK Vulpeculae in 1670–1672 that has puzzled scientists for centuries. Past spectroscopic studies of other stars have turned up more red novae candidates, including V1148 Sagittarii, which was studied as early as 1949. These retrospective inferences have also identified potential red novae like M31 RV that are outside of the Milky Way, including M31LRN 2015, M85 OT2006, NGC300OT2008, and SN2008S.

More recent studies have been more forward-looking, trying to identify stars that match the profile of V1309 Scorpii's progenitor. A search among other contact binaries by OGLE found 14 different contact binary systems with decreasing periods over 0.8 days that are all candidates for upcoming stellar mergers.
