= ASASSN-V J173229.06−613712.5 =

Contact binary star system in the constellation Ara

Observation data Epoch J2000 Equinox ICRS
- Constellation: Ara
- Right ascension: 17^{h} 32^{m} 29.06^{s}
- Declination: −61° 37′ 12.5″
Apparent magnitude (V)	14.67 - 14.98	

Characteristics
- Evolutionary stage: Main sequence + main sequence
- Variable type: W UMa

Astrometry
Proper motion (μ)	RA: −1.293 mas/yr Dec.: −25.536 mas/yr
Parallax (π)	2.2529±0.0216 mas
Distance	1,450 ± 10 ly (444 ± 4 pc)

Orbit
Period (P)	0.22875076 d (5.49001824 h)
Semi-major axis (a)	1.450 R_{☉}
Eccentricity (e)	0
Inclination (i)	68.356+1.358 −1.270°

Details

Primary
Mass	0.692 M_{☉}
Radius	0.844 R_{☉}
Luminosity	0.178 L_{☉}
Surface gravity (log g)	4.43 cgs
Temperature	4172 K
Age	≤ 371 Myr

Secondary
Mass	0.090 M_{☉}
Radius	0.362 R_{☉}
Luminosity	0.052 L_{☉}
Surface gravity (log g)	4.28 cgs
Temperature	4596 K
Age	≤ 371 Myr

Other designations
- ASASSN-V J173229.05-613711.9, WISEA J173229.05-613712.7

Database references
SIMBAD	data

ASASSN-V J173229.06−613712.5 is a contact binary star system located in the tidal tail of the open cluster Mamajek 4, at a distance of approximately 444 parsecs (1,450 light-years) in the zodiacal constellation Ara.

== Discovery ==
The object was catalogued as part of the All Sky Automated Survey for SuperNovae (ASAS-SN) project. During the survey, the star was identified as variable, which is reflected in the "V" index in its designation, and the subsequent digits indicate its celestial coordinates.

A detailed study of the physical nature and evolutionary status of the system was published in April 2026 by a group of astrophysicists led by Xiang Bin and Liu Liang. The researchers combined photometric data from the TESS space telescope and astrometric measurements from the Gaia spacecraft. As a result of the analysis, it was established that the star is dynamically linked to the tidal tail of the Mamajek 4 cluster.

== Physical Characteristics ==
The system ASASSN-V J173229.06−613712.5 belongs to the W Ursae Majoris type of close contact binary systems. Analysis of TESS space telescope photometry, conducted using MCMC statistical modeling, revealed a noticeable asymmetry in the object's light curve. This feature is explained by the presence of an extensive low-temperature region – a cool starspot on the surface of the more massive primary star.

According to the calculated data, the orbital plane is inclined to the line of sight at an angle 68.356+1.358
−1.270°, and the degree of filling of the inner Roche lobe (contact factor) is 66.3+5.0
−5.3%. The photometric mass ratio of the stellar pair is extremely low and is fixed at 0.130±0.004. Since the object's trajectory and position coincide with the tidal tail of the young open cluster Mamajek 4, the age of this binary system does not exceed 371 million years. The discovery of such a young and simultaneously deep contact system suggests the possibility of accelerated stellar convergence even during the cluster formation stage, which calls into question theories that assume an exclusively long and gradual merger of components under the influence of magnetic stellar winds.
