= TYC 3801-1529-1 =

Star system in the Ursa Major

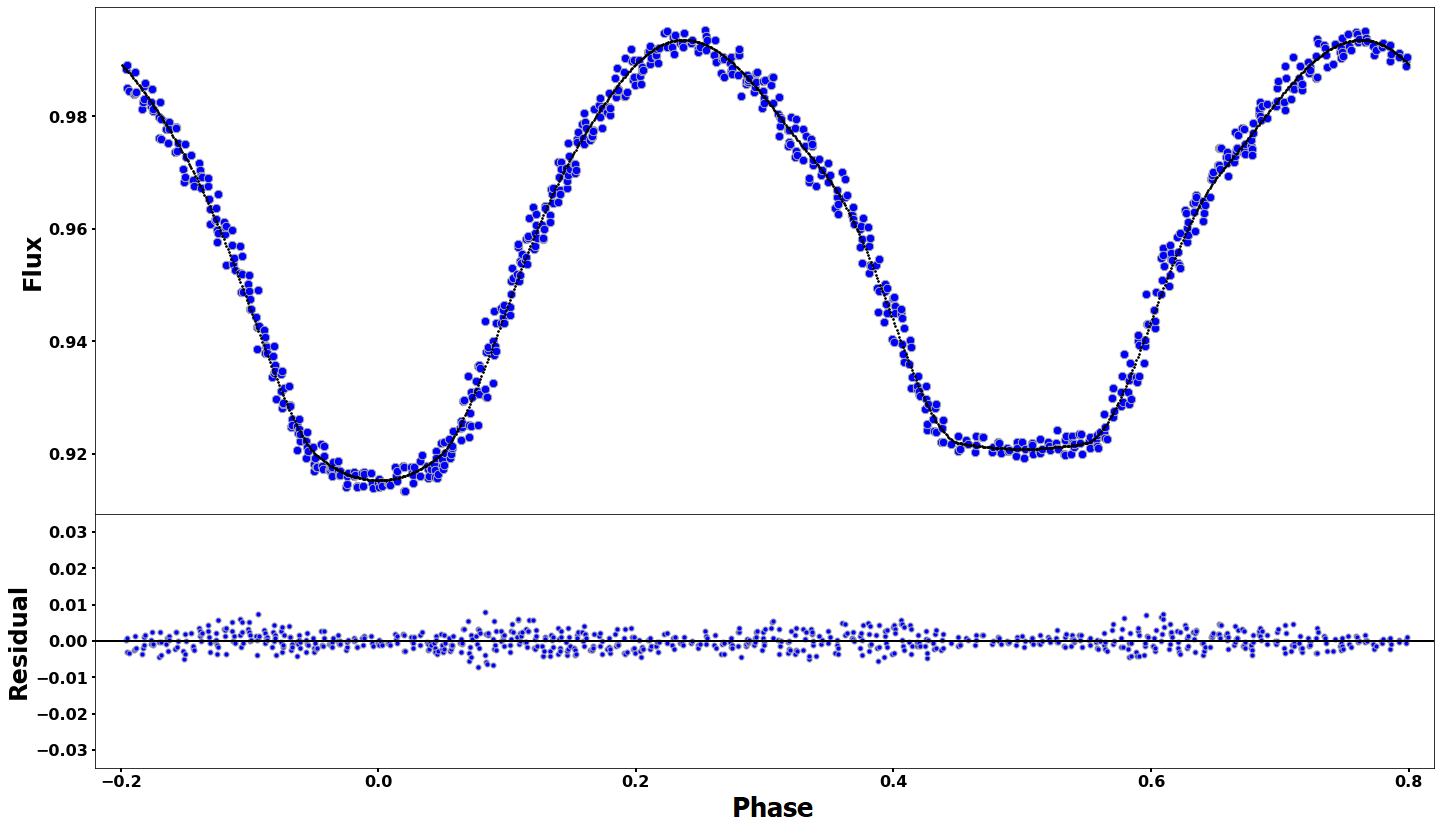
- Observed TESS light curve of TYC 3801-1529-1 along with its synthetic model.

Observation data Epoch J2000 Equinox ICRS
- Constellation: Ursa Major
- Right ascension: 08^{h} 41^{m} 18.848^{s}
- Declination: +56° 50′ 40.60″
Apparent magnitude (V)	12.25	

Characteristics
- Evolutionary stage: Main sequence + Brown dwarf + Red dwarf
- Spectral type: G0
- Apparent magnitude (g): 12.537
- Variable type: W UMa

Astrometry
Proper motion (μ)	RA: −6.6 mas/yr Dec.: −1.1 mas/yr
Distance	2,035±281 ly (624.2±86.3 pc)

Orbit
Primary	Component 1
Name	Component 2
Period (P)	0.3659090 d (8.78182 h)
Semi-major axis (a)	2.760 ± 275 R_{☉}
Eccentricity (e)	0
Inclination (i)	64.31+61 −58°

Details

Component 1
Mass	2.096±0.642 M_{☉}
Radius	1.877±0.188 R_{☉}
Luminosity	4.134±0.835 L_{☉}
Surface gravity (log g)	4.00 cgs
Temperature	6009+51 −53 K
Metallicity [Fe/H]	−0.04 dex

Component 2
Mass	0.050±0.016 M_{☉}
Radius	0.378±0.044 R_{☉}
Luminosity	0.153±0.036 L_{☉}
Temperature	5871+54 −55 K

Component 3
Mass	0.40 - 0.58 M_{☉}

Other designations
- ATO J130.3284+56.8445, TIC 445065429, 2MASS J08411885+5650406, ZTF J084118.84+565040.5

Database references
SIMBAD	data

TYC 3801-1529-1 is a triple star system located 2035 light-years from the Sun in the constellation Ursa Major. This system is the lowest-mass contact binary ever discovered in the universe.

The two inner components form a close W Ursae Majoris-type contact binary system. The primary star has a mass of approximately 2.1 M_{☉}, while the secondary star has a mass of 0.050 M_{☉}, or 50 Mj, and is likely a brown dwarf. The mass ratio of the components is q = 0.024, which is the lowest known mass ratio among analyzed contact binary systems. They take approximately 0.3659 days, or about 8.78 hours, to orbit their common barycenter. The degree of contact (filling factor of the total gas envelope) is 35.7%. It was initially discovered by the Zwicky Transient Facility on April 21, 2019. In 2020, a group of researchers led by Chen classified the object as a contact binary system, noting the anomalously low light curve amplitude in the g-band, which was only 0.108 magnitudes. In November 2024, an international team of astronomers from China and South Korea, led by Professor Kai Li from Shandong University, published the results of the first comprehensive study of the system.

The third component of the system was discovered in 2026, through the method of excess radiation in the light curve and periodic secular shifts in the times of eclipse minima on the O-C diagram over 16 years of observations. It is an isolated M-type red dwarf with a mass in the range of 0.48 - 0.58 M_{☉}. It is 6–7 times more massive than the secondary component of the close pair. Its gravitational influence plays a key role in the system's evolution. Through secular perturbations, this object contributed to the loss of angular momentum by the central pair, leading to their approach and the formation of a common envelope. Currently, the system's orbital period is secularly increasing at a rate of 7.96×10^-7 days per year, indicating active mass transfer. The presence of asymmetry in the light curves confirms the existence of a large hot spot on the primary component, caused by bombardment by accreting gas. Since the current mass ratio is below the theoretical limit for dynamical stability, the system will evolve in the long term towards the inevitable merger of the components into a single rapidly rotating star.
