= Y Sextantis =

Variable star in the constellation Sextans

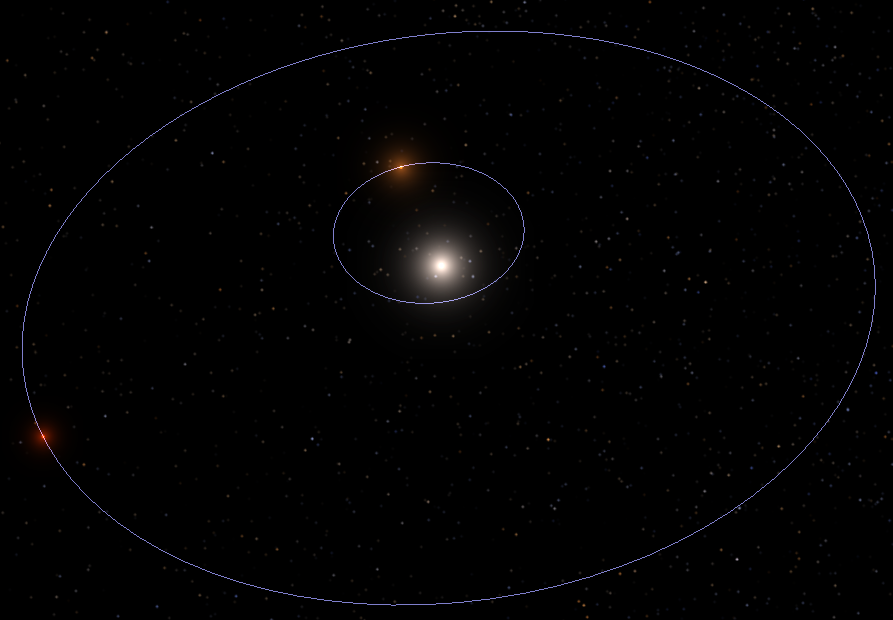
- Possible architecture for Y Sextantis' multiple system

Observation data Epoch J2000.0 Equinox J2000.0
- Constellation: Sextans
- Right ascension: 10^{h} 02^{m} 47.96897^{s}
- Declination: +01° 05′ 40.1839″
- Apparent magnitude (V): 9.88 (10.08 + 12.70)

Characteristics
- Spectral type: F3/5V or F5/6V
- B−V color index: 0.479±0.072
- Variable type: W UMa

Astrometry
Radial velocity (R_{v})	+13.12±7.76 km/s
Proper motion (μ)	RA: +0.282 mas/yr Dec.: +5.112 mas/yr
Parallax (π)	2.5554±0.2972 mas
Distance	approx. 1,300 ly (approx. 390 pc)

Details

A
Mass	1.476±0.045 M_{☉}
Radius	1.586±0.018 R_{☉}
Luminosity	3.802±0.253 L_{☉}
Temperature	6,650±163 K

B
Mass	0.288±0.033 M_{☉}
Radius	0.750±0.008 R_{☉}
Luminosity	0.759±0.059 L_{☉}
Temperature	6,294±15 K

Other designations
- Y Sex, BD+01°2394, HD 87079, HIP 49217, WDS J10028+0106

Database references
SIMBAD	data

Y Sextantis, abbreviated as Y Sex, is a variable star system in the equatorial constellation of Sextans. The system is invisible to the naked eye with a mean apparent visual magnitude of 9.88. It is located roughly at 1,300 light years from the Sun based on parallax.

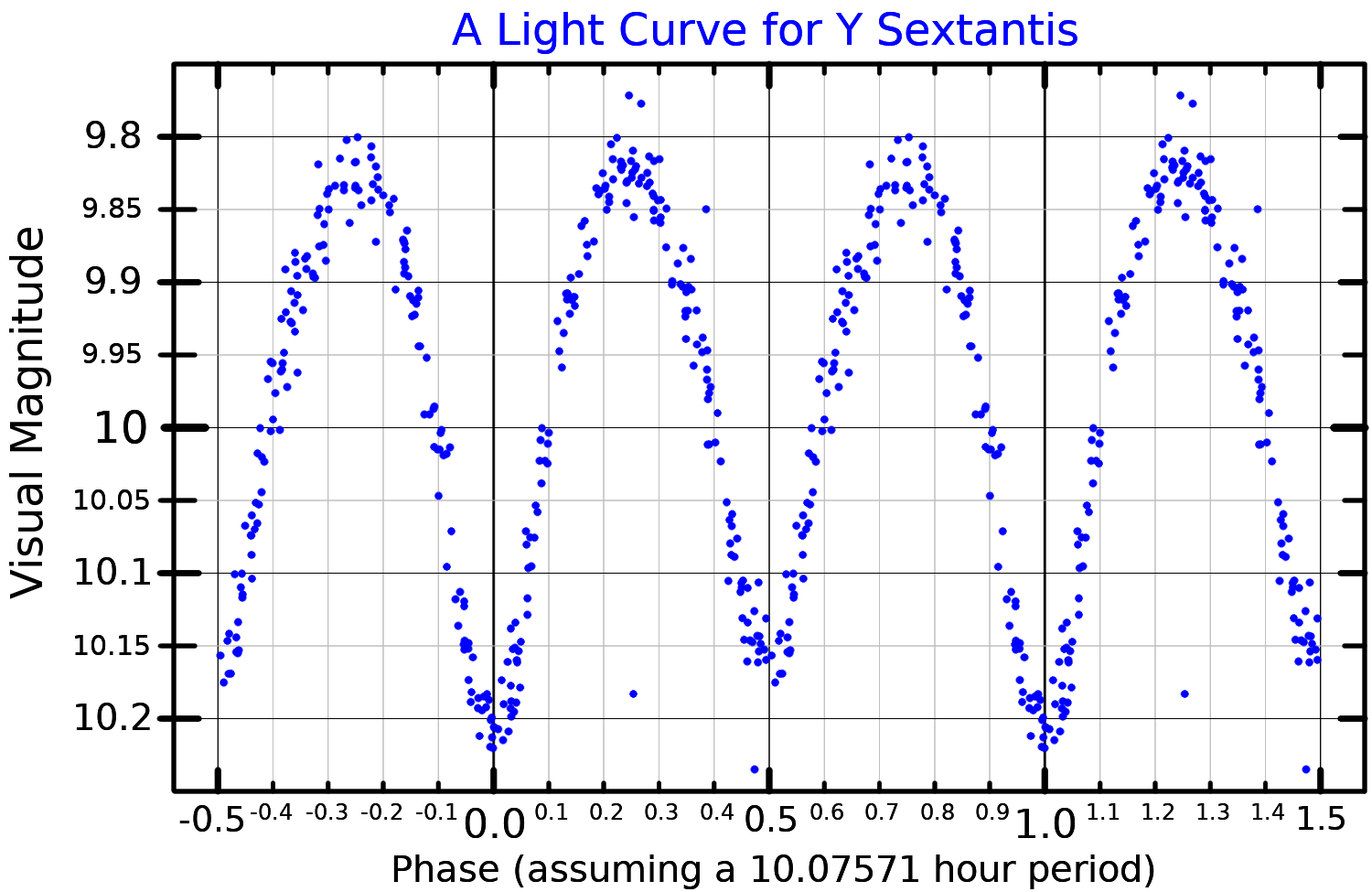
A visual band light curve for Y Sextantis, plotted from ASAS data

The variability of this system was first announced by C. Hoffmeister in 1934. It was determined to be a short period, strongly-interacting eclipsing binary system. Observations of the light variations up until 1979 were used by G. Hill to generate orbital properties, providing an orbital inclination of 76.8°±0.3°.

This is a multiple star system. The two main components have apparent magnitudes of 10.08 and 12.70, and are separated by 0.50 arcseconds. The brighter component is a W Ursae Majoris variable eclipsing contact binary star system, whose two component stars share a common outer layer. Because the two components share their outer layers as the components of W Ursae Majoris do, they have the same stellar classification, and are classified as yellow F-type main sequence dwarfs. The components take 0.419822800 days (roughly 10 hours) to revolve around common barycentre. Orbital period variations would suggest the presence of additional perturbing objects, one of them likely substellar.

== Possible perturbing third and fourth bodies ==
Orbital period variations suggest the presence of one more perturbing unseen object. The authors He & Qian have estimated two possible orbital periods and minimum masses for unseen companions: the former cyclic oscillation would occur every 51.22 years (with amplitude of 0.0218 days) being caused by a low-mass stellar companion (likely a M dwarf star), whereas the latter would consist in a 32.1 years period and the unseen object could likely be substellar.
