= EQ Tauri =

Triple star system

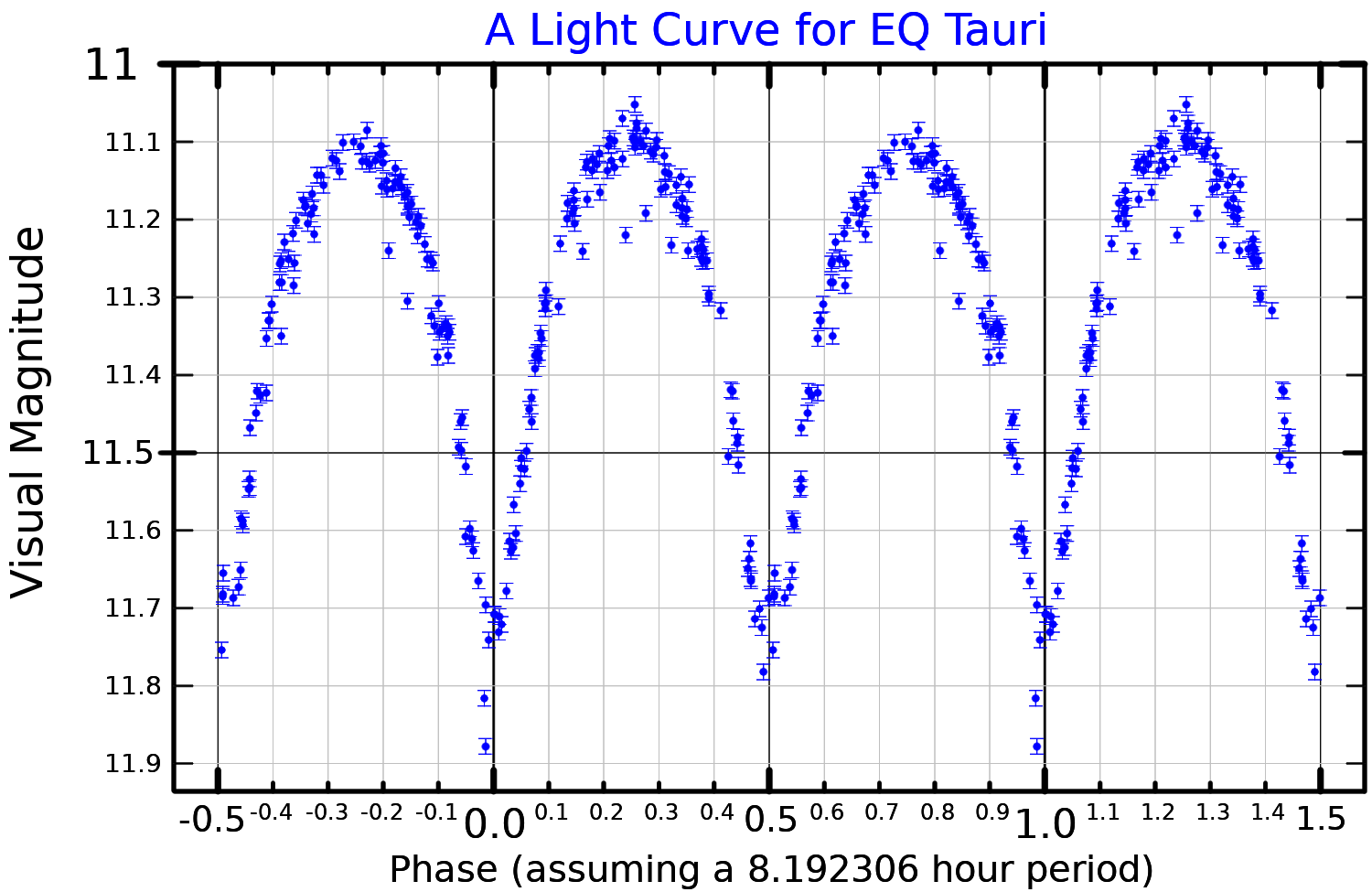
- A visual band light curve for EQ Tauri, plotted from ASAS-SN data

Observation data Epoch J2000.0 Equinox J2000.0
- Constellation: Taurus
- Right ascension: 03^{h} 48^{m} 13.436^{s}
- Declination: +22° 18′ 50.92″
- Apparent magnitude (V): 10.5 (-11.03)

Characteristics
- Spectral type: G2
- Variable type: W UMa

Astrometry
Radial velocity (R_{v})	71.95±1.22 km/s
Proper motion (μ)	RA: +69.758 mas/yr Dec.: −30.628 mas/yr
Parallax (π)	4.4694±0.0171 mas
Distance	730 ± 3 ly (223.7 ± 0.9 pc)

Orbit
Period (P)	0.341348 d
Semi-major axis (a)	2.48±0.03 R_{☉}
Eccentricity (e)	0.00
Periastron epoch (T)	2,451,183.9 HJD
Semi-amplitude (K_{1}) (primary)	112.41±1.43 km/s
Semi-amplitude (K_{2}) (secondary)	254.38±2.42 km/s

Details

Primary
Mass	1.22±0.04 M_{☉}
Radius	1.14±0.01 R_{☉}
Luminosity	1.32±0.03 L_{☉}
Temperature	5,800±100 K

Secondary
Mass	0.54±0.02 M_{☉}
Radius	0.79±0.01 R_{☉}
Luminosity	0.63±0.02 L_{☉}

Other designations
- EQ Tau, TIC 440686937, GSC 01260-00909, 2MASS J03481342+2218509, HV 6189

Database references
SIMBAD	data

EQ Tauri is a triple star system in the equatorial constellation of Taurus that includes a contact eclipsing binary. The system is too faint to be viewed with the naked eye, having a baseline apparent visual magnitude of 10.5. During the primary eclipse, the brightness of the system drops to magnitude 11.03, then to 10.97 during the secondary minimum. The secondary eclipse is total. Based on parallax measurements, it is located at a distance of approximately 730 light years from the Sun.

The star HV 6189 was identified as a short-period variable by H. Shapley and E. M. Hughes in 1940, then was more closely studied by Soviet astronomer V. P. Tsesevich in 1954. It was determined to be a W UMa-type variable and was noted for being located in the region of the Pleiades open cluster. An analysis of data from Tsesevich and subsequent observations by B. S. Whitney in 1972 suggested that the period is variable. His observations from Konkoly Observatory showed a period of 8.19 h. W. R. Benbow and R. L. Mutel built a light curve of the eclipsing variable in 1995 that displayed evidence of an active region on the stellar surface. Orbital period changes continued to be observed, and in 2002 T. Pribulla and M. Vanko suggested it is caused by a third body in the system. They modeled it as a low mass red dwarf with an orbital period of 50.2 years.

This is a shallow contact binary system, belonging to sub-type A of the W Ursae Majoris class. It has an orbital period of 8.1924 hours and a semimajor axis of 2.48 times the radius of the Sun. The orbit shows a cyclical change with a period of 22.7 years and an amplitude of 0.0058 days. A transit-like event was observed in 2010. The more massive component is a solar-type star with a deep convection zone that appears magnetically active with a significant coverage of star spots.
