= YY Canis Minoris =

Binary star in the constellation Canis Minor

- Location of YY Canis Minoris (circled)

Observation data Epoch J2000 Equinox ICRS
- Constellation: Canis Minor
- Right ascension: 08^{h} 06^{m} 38.55827^{s}
- Declination: +01° 55′ 46.4758″
- Apparent magnitude (V): 8.70 (8.460-9.230)

Characteristics
- Spectral type: F1V-IV + F5V-IV
- B−V color index: +0.45
- J−H color index: +0.204
- J−K color index: +0.309
- Variable type: W UMa

Astrometry
Proper motion (μ)	RA: −11.051 mas/yr Dec.: 8.090 mas/yr
Parallax (π)	4.2234±0.0283 mas
Distance	772 ± 5 ly (237 ± 2 pc)

Orbit
Primary	YY CMi A
Name	YY CMi B
Period (P)	1.0940197 d
Semi-major axis (a)	6.41 R_{☉}
Inclination (i)	78.76±0.04°

Details

YY CMi A
Mass	1.56 M_{☉}
Radius	2.52±0.01 R_{☉}
Luminosity	13.5 L_{☉}
Surface gravity (log g)	3.83±0.01 cgs
Temperature	7000±100 K

YY CMi B
Mass	1.39 M_{☉}
Radius	2.38±0.01 R_{☉}
Luminosity	7.2 L_{☉}
Surface gravity (log g)	3.83±0.01 cgs
Temperature	6161±36 K

Other designations
- YY CMi, AG+02°1064, BD+02°1872, HD 67110, SAO 116352, PPM 153885, TIC 452928315, TYC 198-1383-1, GSC 00198-01383, 2MASS J08063856+0155464, Gaia DR3 3090880296971961216

Database references
SIMBAD	data

YY Canis Minoris, abbreviated YY CMi and otherwise referred to as HD 67110, is an eclipsing contact binary in the constellation of Canis Minor, close to the border with Hydra. Its apparent magnitude ranges between 8.46 and 9.23, making it too faint to be seen by the naked eye but visible using binoculars. It is located at a distance of approximately 772 light-years (237 pc) according to Gaia DR3 parallax measurements.

== Stellar properties ==
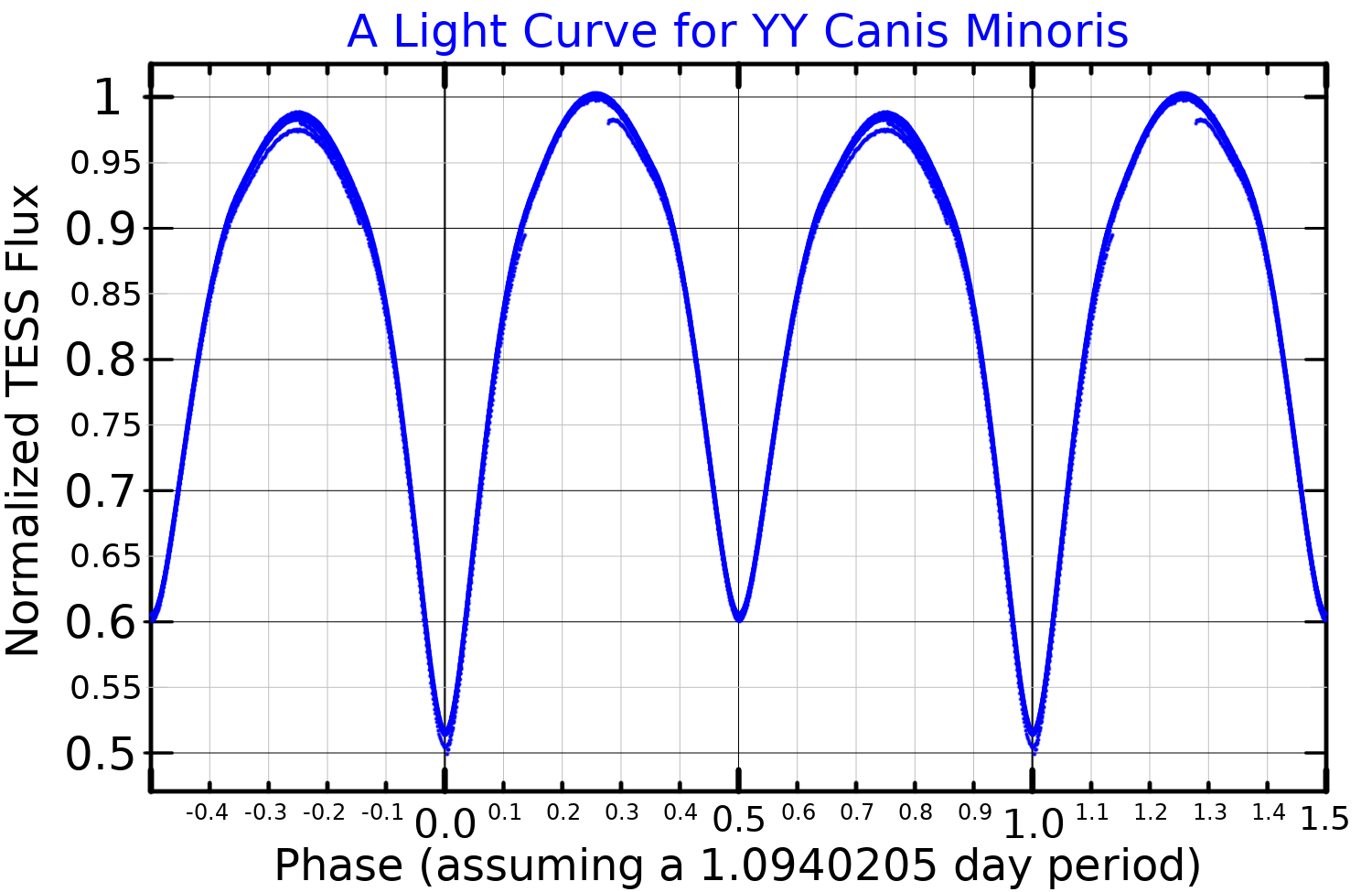
A light curve for YY Canis Minoris, plotted from TESS data

The system consists of two F-type stars more massive and hotter than the Sun. Both objects are larger than typical F-type main-sequence stars, which may be because they are evolving away from the main sequence. As such, they both received the luminosity class V-IV, with their spectra indicating an intermediate luminosity between main-sequence stars and subgiants.

The two stars orbit each other every 1.094 days, separated by a mere 6.41 solar radii. As a result, both of them are gravitationally distorted and overfilling their Roche lobes, becoming a W Ursae Majoris variable (also known as a low mass contact binary).

== Observational history ==
YY CMi was first reported to be variable in August 1934 by Otto Morgenroth of the Sonneberg Observatory, who described it as an Algol variable with a magnitude range of 8.4 to 8.8. The 1958 edition of the General Catalogue of Variable Stars listed it as a Beta Lyrae variable with a combined spectral type of F5. Krishna Damodar Abhyankar (1962) gave the spectral types F6III and A5V to the two components, though this was noted to be incorrect in 1970 and, in 1981, the two were reclassified as evolved stars of roughly the types F6 and early G comprising a contact binary. This evolved and contact nature of the system has been supported by subsequent studies, but a re-examination of Abhyankar's light curves in 1999 yielded slightly earlier evolutionary stages and spectral types for the stars.
