= V752 Centauri =

Star in the constellation Centaurus

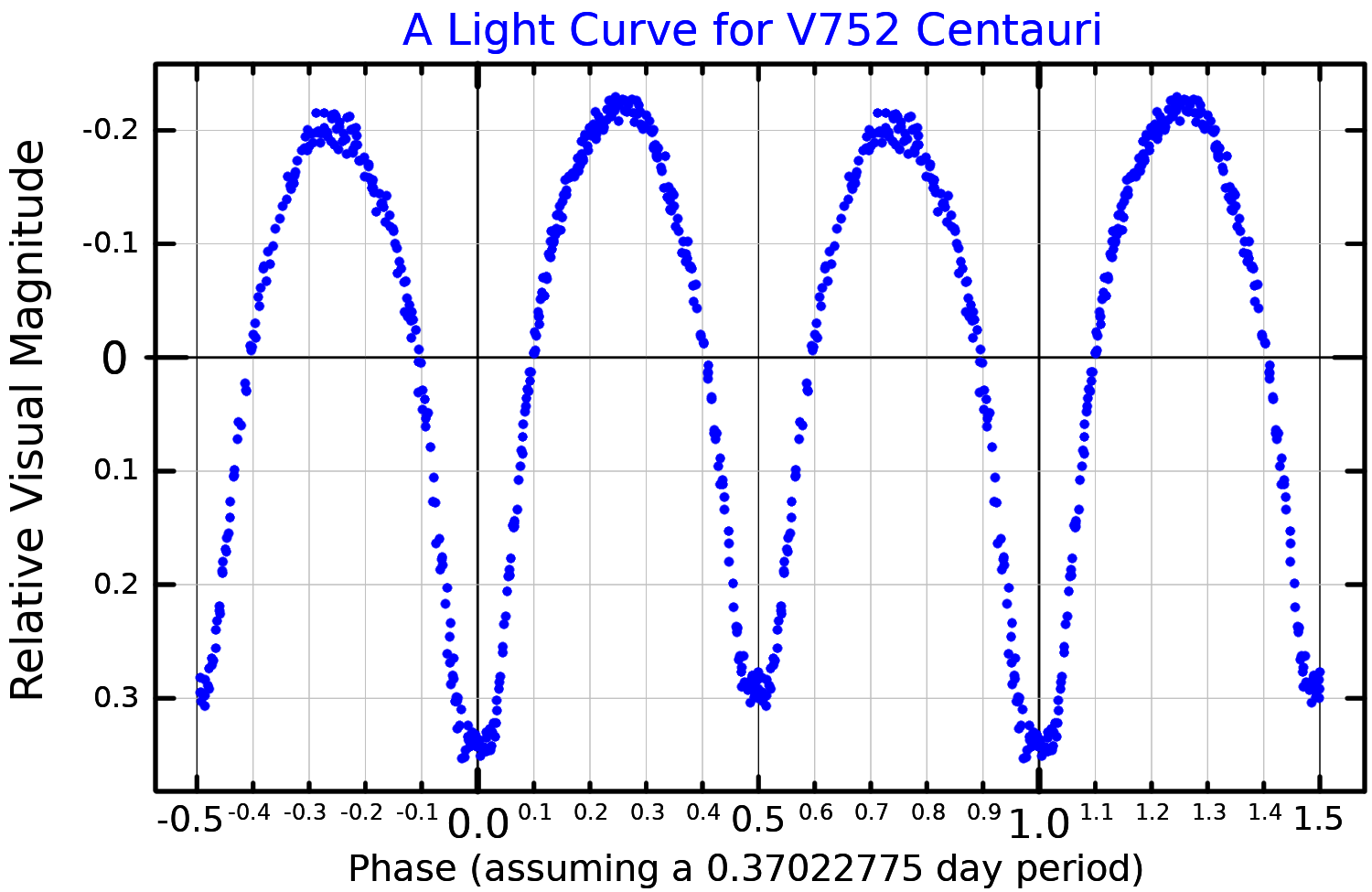
- A visual band light curve for V752 Centauri, plotted from data presented by Sisteró and Castore de Sisteró (1973)

Observation data Epoch J2000 Equinox ICRS
- Constellation: Centaurus
- Right ascension: 11^{h} 42^{m} 48.08^{s}
- Declination: −35° 48′ 57.5″
- Apparent magnitude (V): 9.10 – 9.66

Characteristics
- Evolutionary stage: F7/G0(V)
- Variable type: W UMa

Astrometry
Proper motion (μ)	RA: −52.175 mas/yr Dec.: −24.364 mas/yr
Parallax (π)	7.9641±0.0495 mas
Distance	410 ± 3 ly (125.6 ± 0.8 pc)
Absolute magnitude (M_{V})	4.00 ± 0.34

Orbit
Period (P)	0.37023198 days
Semi-major axis (a)	2.59 ± 0.05 R_{☉}
Inclination (i)	82.07 ± 0.06°
Semi-amplitude (K_{1}) (primary)	83.2±5.7 km/s
Semi-amplitude (K_{2}) (secondary)	267.2±6.9 km/s

Details
Age	3.84 Gyr

Primary
Mass	1.31 ± 0.07 M_{☉}
Radius	1.30 ± 0.02 R_{☉}
Luminosity	2.00 ± 0.07} L_{☉}
Temperature	5,955 ± 77 K

Secondary
Mass	0.39 ± 0.02 M_{☉}
Radius	0.77 ± 0.01 R_{☉}
Luminosity	0.75 ± 0.03 L_{☉}
Temperature	6,221 ± 81 K

Other designations
- V752 Cen, CD−35°7392, HD 101799, HIP 57129, SAO 202729

Database references
SIMBAD	data

V752 Centauri (HD 101799) is multiple star system and variable star in the constellation of Centaurus. An eclipsing binary, its apparent magnitude has a maximum of 9.10, dimming to 9.66 during primary eclipse and 9.61 during secondary eclipse. Its variability was discovered by Howard Bond in 1970. From parallax measurements by the Gaia spacecraft, the system is located at a distance of 410 light-years (125.6 parsecs) from Earth.

V752 Centauri is a contact binary of the W Ursae Majoris type, composed of two F-type stars with a combined spectral type of F7/G0(V). Individually, the components have been classified as F8 + F5, and F8 + F7.5. With effective temperatures of 5,955 and 6,221 K, the system is classified as a W Ursae Majoris variable of subtype W, where the secondary star is hotter than the primary; for this reason, the primary eclipses are caused by the occultation of the secondary star. The system has an orbital period of only 0.3702 days and a separation of 2.59 solar radii. The orbit is inclined by 82° in relation to the plane of the sky.

The combination of photometric and spectroscopic data have allowed the direct determination of the parameters of the stars. The primary component has a mass of 1.31 times the solar mass, radius of 1.30 times the solar radius and a luminosity double that of the Sun. The secondary has only 0.39 times the solar mass, 0.77 times the solar radius, and 0.75 times the solar luminosity. Since the stars are in contact, there is considerable mass transfer from the secondary to the primary. It is estimated that the secondary star was initially the more massive star, with 1.76 times the solar mass, while the primary had an initial mass of 0.84 time the solar mass. The system's age is estimated at 3.8 billion years. All contact binary stars are expected to eventually merge into a single, fast-rotating star.

The system's spectrum shows the spectral lines of a third star, which seems to be a K-type main sequence star. This third star is itself a spectroscopic binary with a period of 5.147 days, with a small companion that is probably an M-type red dwarf. The V752 Centauri system is thus composed of four stars, with two binary pairs that orbit each other. Most contact binary stars have one or more distant companions, and were possibly formed by angular momentum loss due to gravitational interactions with these companion stars.

The light curve analysis of V752 Centauri reveals that between 1970 and 2000, the orbital period of the eclipsing binary remained approximately constant, indicating there was no significant mass transfer. Around the year 2000, the period abruptly increased, possibly accompanied by a slightly dimmer primary eclipse. Since then, the period has been increasing at a rate of 0.044 seconds per year, which is caused by mass transfer from the less massive star to the more massive one at a rate of 2.52×10^{−7} M_{☉} per year. This period change and the beginning of the mass transfer phase were possibly caused by interactions with the companion binary star.
