= CX Canis Majoris =

Blue variable star in the constellation Canis Major

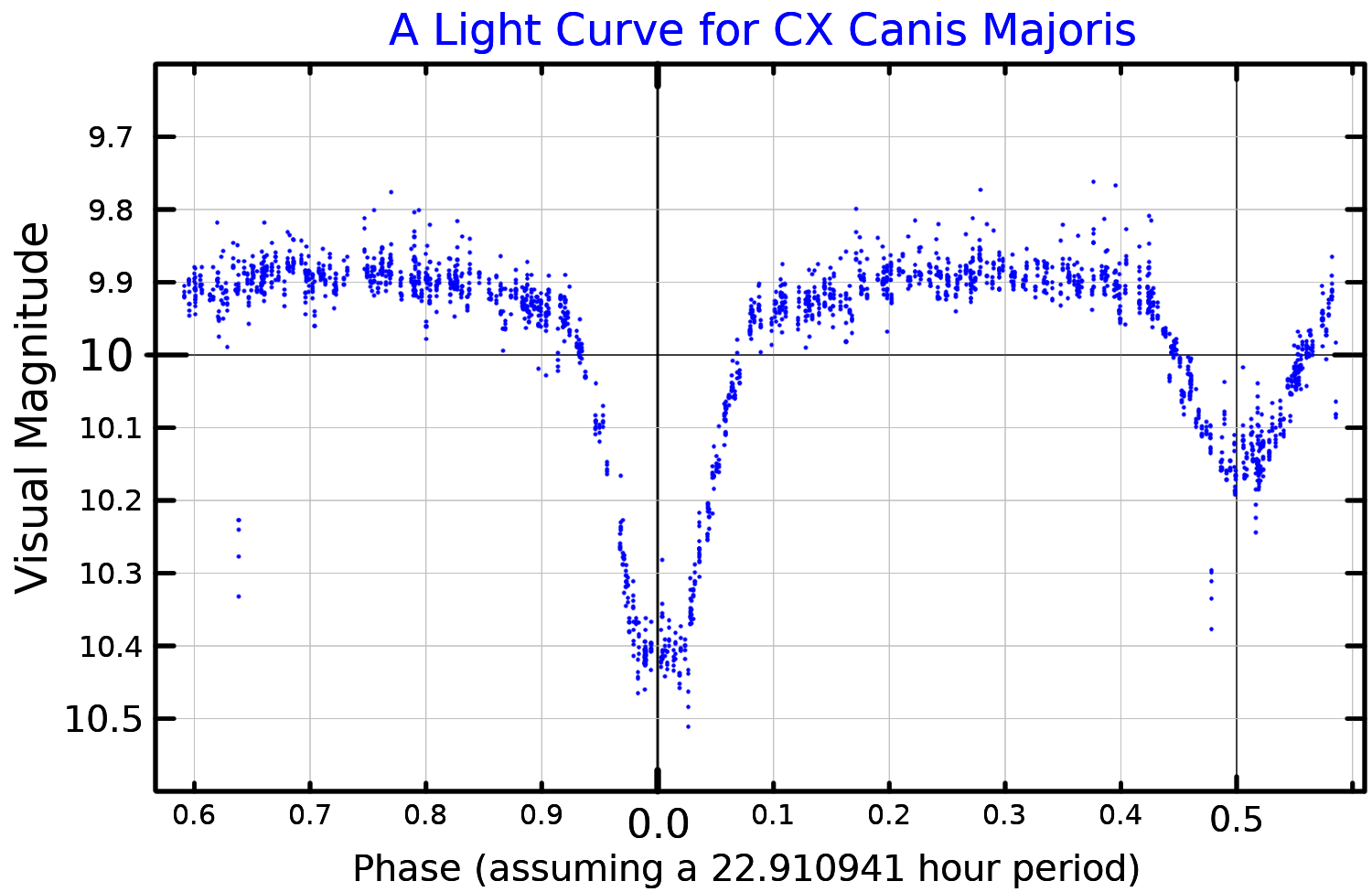
- A visual band light curve for CX Canis Majoris, plotted from All Sky Automated Survey data

Observation data Epoch J2000 Equinox ICRS
- Constellation: Canis Major
- Right ascension: 07^{h} 22^{m} 00.98686^{s}
- Declination: −25° 52′ 35.9276″
- Apparent magnitude (V): 9.89 (-10.14) - 10.42

Characteristics
- Evolutionary stage: B5V
- Variable type: Algol

Astrometry
Proper motion (μ)	RA: −2.656 mas/yr Dec.: 2.777 mas/yr
Parallax (π)	0.7147±0.0586 mas
Distance	4,600 ± 400 ly (1,400 ± 100 pc)

Details

A
Mass	5.9 M_{☉}
Temperature	15,200 K

B
Mass	3.4 M_{☉}
Temperature	10,600 K

Other designations
- CD−25 4424, TYC 6541-1691-1

Database references
SIMBAD	data

CX CMa (CX Canis Majoris) is a blue variable star in the constellation Canis Major. Discovery of this variable is usually credited to German Astronomer Cuno Hoffmeister in 1931, although this remains uncertain.

It is an eclipsing binary of Algol (detached) whose magnitude varies between 9.9 and 10.4 with a period of 0.95462500 day (22.911000 hour). The variability was first discovered in 1931. Doubts arose because of scatter in the data and the small amplitude, but the discovery was confirmed by 1949. Its Algol-type light curve exhibits the O'Connell effect, meaning that there is a magnitude difference between subsequent maxima.

The temperature of the secondary star has been estimated at 10,600 K and its mass at 3.4 M_{☉}. The spectral type of the secondary star is estimated to be in the B8 to A0 range.
