= W Crucis =

Variable star in the constellation Crux

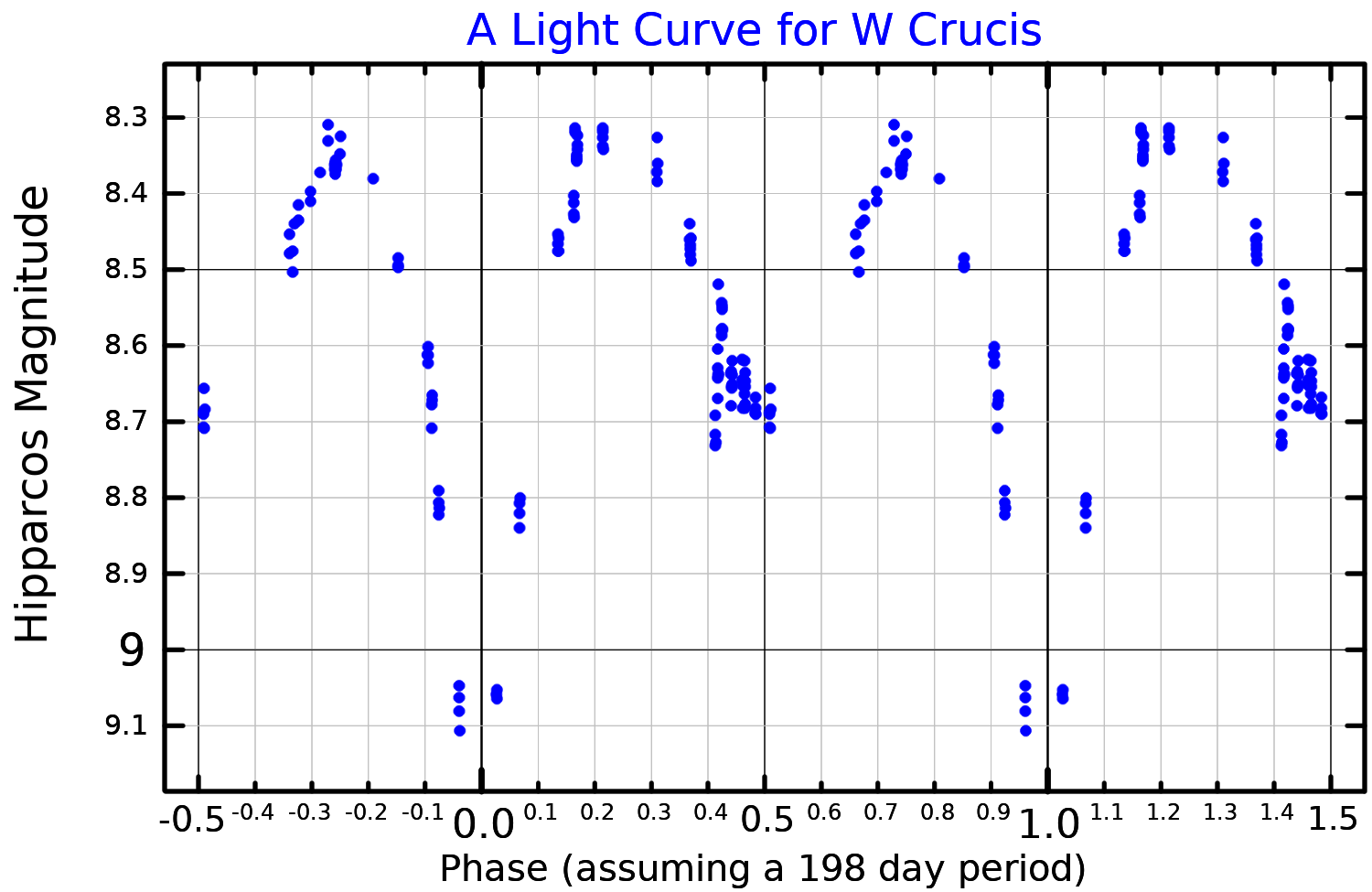
- A visual band light curve for W Crucis, plotted from Hipparcos data

Observation data Epoch J2000 Equinox ICRS
- Constellation: Crux
- Right ascension: 12^{h} 11^{m} 59.16182^{s}
- Declination: −58° 47′ 00.7374″
- Apparent magnitude (V): 8.18(-8.50)-9.01

Characteristics
- Spectral type: F8/G1Ia/abe (B + G1Iab)
- Variable type: Algol

Astrometry
Radial velocity (R_{v})	−22.6±2 km/s
Proper motion (μ)	RA: −6.142 mas/yr Dec.: 0.198 mas/yr
Parallax (π)	0.5363±0.0421 mas
Distance	6,100 ± 500 ly (1,900 ± 100 pc)

Orbit
Period (P)	198.5 days
Semi-major axis (a)	306 R_{☉}
Inclination (i)	88.2°

Details
Luminosity	1,928 L_{☉}

A
Mass	8.2 M_{☉}
Radius	71 R_{☉}
Temperature	14,000 K

B
Mass	1.6 M_{☉}
Radius	4 R_{☉}
Temperature	5,500 K

Other designations
- CD−58 4431, CPD−58 4151, HD 105998, HIP 59483

Database references
SIMBAD	data

W Crucis is a single-lined eclipsing variable star system in the constellation Crux. It has a spectral class of F8/G1Ia/abe indicating a yellow supergiant with emission lines in its spectrum.

W Crucis varies in brightness between magnitude 8.18 and 9.01 over a period of 198.5 days. Its light curve has been observed to be asymmetric with subsequent maxima differing in height, which is described as the so-called O'Connell effect. A secondary minimum is observed when the brightness drops to magnitude 8.5. The shape and duration of the eclipses show that the two stars are detached and that there is an accretion disk around the primary, more massive, star.

Spectral lines can only be seen for one of the stars, a yellow supergiant. The other, more massive, star is hidden within an accretion disk of material stripped from the supergiant. The hidden star has properties that suggest it is a mid-B main sequence star. The two are separated by 306 R_{☉}, about 1.4 AU. The hot main sequence star has a mass of 8.2 M_{☉}, while the supergiant only has a mass of 1.6 M_{☉}. The supergiant is deformed by the gravity of the more massive primary star, fills its Roche lobe, and is losing mass.

The disk around the hot star is 124 R_{☉} wide and 17 R_{☉} thick, with a temperature at its outer visible edge of 3600 K. It is the source of the emission lines seen in the spectrum.
