= V1191 Cygni =

Star in the constellation Cygnus

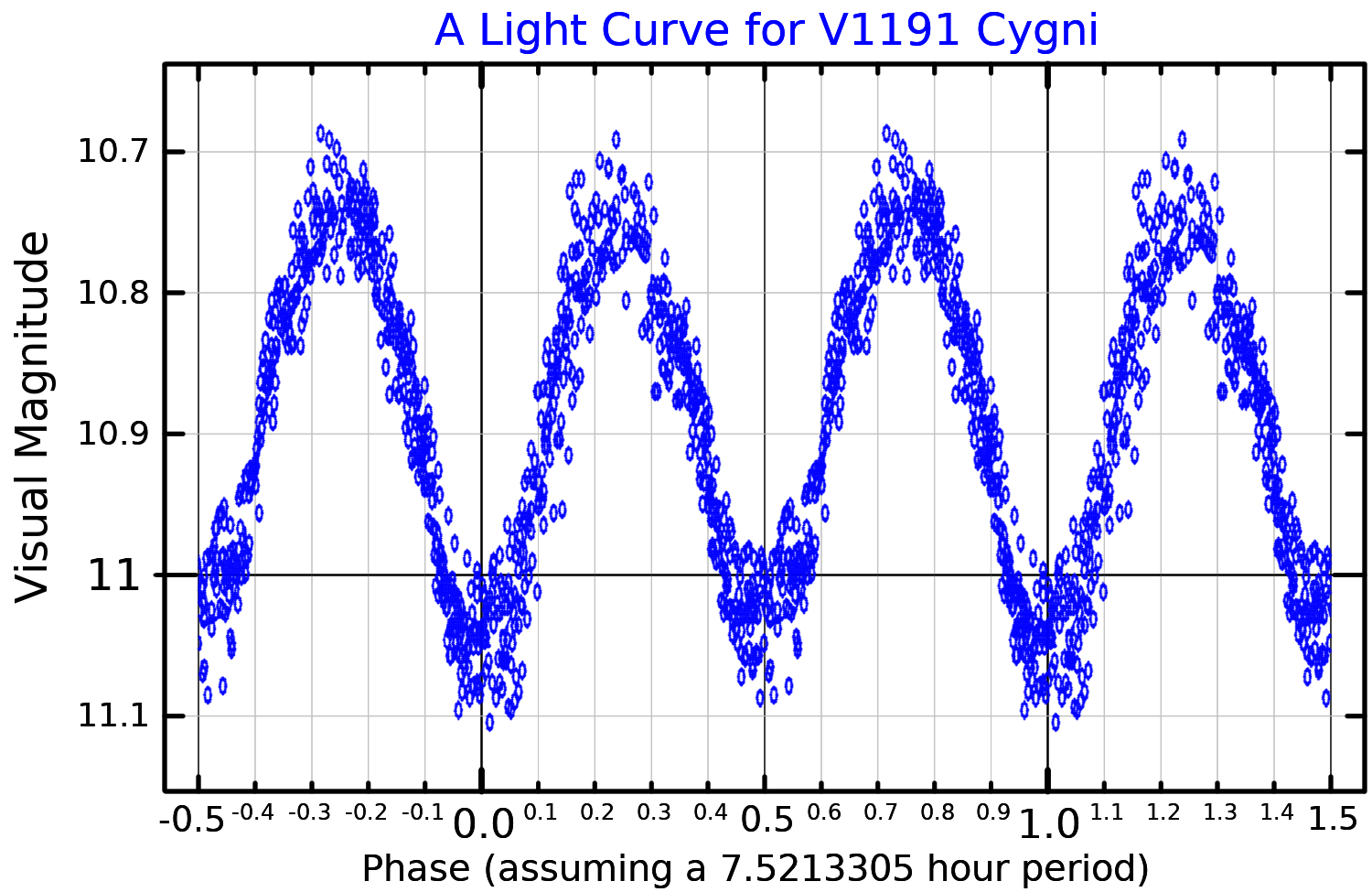
- A visual band light curve for V1191 Cygni, adapted from Ostadnezhad et al. (2014)

Observation data Epoch J2000 Equinox ICRS
- Constellation: Cygnus
- Right ascension: 20^{h} 16^{m} 50.8045^{s}
- Declination: +41° 57′ 41.360″
- Apparent magnitude (V): 10.82 – 11.15

Characteristics
- Spectral type: F6V + G5V
- Apparent magnitude (B): 11.41
- Apparent magnitude (R): 10.55
- Apparent magnitude (I): 10.06
- Apparent magnitude (J): 9.82
- Apparent magnitude (H): 9.56
- Apparent magnitude (K): 9.51
- B−V color index: 0.62
- Variable type: W UMa

Astrometry
Radial velocity (R_{v})	−32±13 km/s
Proper motion (μ)	RA: +38.115 mas/yr Dec.: +23.341 mas/yr
Parallax (π)	4.5063±0.0127 mas
Distance	724 ± 2 ly (221.9 ± 0.6 pc)

A
Absolute magnitude (M_{V})	3.82

B
Absolute magnitude (M_{V})	5.73

Orbit
Period (P)	0.3134 d
Semi-major axis (a)	2.182 R_{☉}

Details

A
Mass	1.29 ± 0.08 M_{☉}
Radius	1.31 ± 0.18 R_{☉}
Luminosity (bolometric)	2.71 ± 0.44 L_{☉}
Surface gravity (log g)	4.31 cgs
Temperature	6500 K
Age	3.85 ± 0.21 Gyr

B
Mass	0.13 ± 0.01 M_{☉}
Radius	0.52 ± 0.15 R_{☉}
Luminosity (bolometric)	0.46 ± 0.08 L_{☉}
Surface gravity (log g)	4.12 cgs
Temperature	6610 ± 200 K
Age	3.85 ± 0.21 Gyr

Other designations
- GSC 03159-01512, 2MASS J20165081+4157413, SBC9 2996, TYC 3159-1512-1

Database references
SIMBAD	data

V1191 Cygni is the variable star designation for an overcontact binary star system in the constellation Cygnus. First found to be variable in 1965, it is a W Ursae Majoris variable with a maximum apparent magnitude 10.82. It drops by 0.33 magnitudes during primary eclipses with a period of 0.3134 days, while dropping by 0.29 magnitudes during secondary eclipses. The primary star, which is also the cooler star, appears to have a spectral type of F6V, while the secondary is slightly cooler with a spectral type of G5V. With a mass of 1.29 solar masses and a luminosity of 2.71 solar luminosities, it is slightly more massive and luminous than the sun, while the secondary is only around 1/10 as massive and less than half as luminous. With a separation of 2.20 solar radii, the mass transfer of about 2×10^{−7} solar masses per year from the secondary to the primary is one of the highest known for a system of its type.

V1191 Cygni is a W-type W UMa variable, meaning that the primary eclipse occurs when the less-massive component is eclipsed by the larger, more massive component, although the masses are unusually different for such a system. The current period is very short for a system of its spectral type, suggesting that the stars are relatively small for their mass and age, which is likely around 3.85 billion years. The pair's orbital period is increasing at a rate of over 4×10^{−7} days per year, one of the fastest known rates among contact binary systems, likely due to the high rate of mass transfer. In addition to the period increase, there is cyclic period change of 0.023 days over 26.7 years, caused by either a third body with a mass of 0.77 solar masses or magnetic activity cycles. The mass transfer will likely eventually cause the system to evolve into a single star with a very high rotation rate.
