= SX Corvi =

Eclipsing binary star in the constellation Corvus

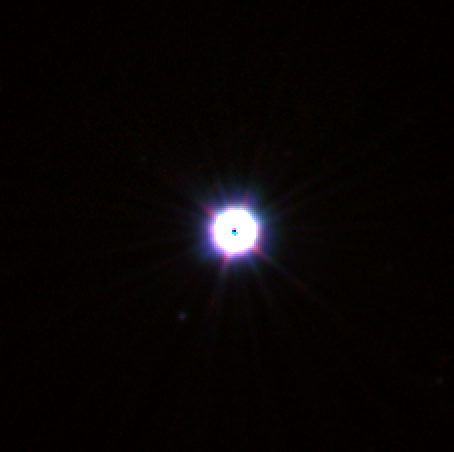
- SX Corvi in the near-infrared Credit: ESO/VHS

Observation data Epoch J2000.0 Equinox J2000.0
- Constellation: Corvus
- Right ascension: 12^{h} 40^{m} 15.04406^{s}
- Declination: −18° 48′ 00.9336″
- Apparent magnitude (V): 8.99 - 9.25

Characteristics
- Spectral type: F7V
- Variable type: W UMa

Astrometry
Radial velocity (R_{v})	8.71 ± 0.94 km/s
Proper motion (μ)	RA: 39.16 ± 1.21 mas/yr Dec.: -6.07 ± 0.80 mas/yr
Parallax (π)	10.94±1.18 mas
Distance	approx. 300 ly (approx. 91 pc)

Details
Age	7.32 ± 0.97 Gyr

Other designations
- SX Corvi, HD 110139, HIP 61825, SAO 157434

Database references
SIMBAD	data

SX Corvi is an eclipsing binary star system in the constellation Corvus, ranging from apparent magnitude 8.99 to 9.25 over 7.6 hours. The system is a contact binary also known as a W Ursae Majoris variable, where the two component stars orbit closely enough to each other for mass to have been transferred between them—in this case the secondary having transferred a large amount of mass to the primary.

Yildiz and colleagues estimated the age of the system at 7.32 ± 0.97 billion years based on study of the properties of the system and estimated rate of mass transfer. They found the current masses of the primary and secondary to be 1.25 ± 0.04 and 0.10 ± 0.01 solar masses respectively, from their original masses of 0.72 ± 0.02 and 1.68 ± 0.05 solar masses.

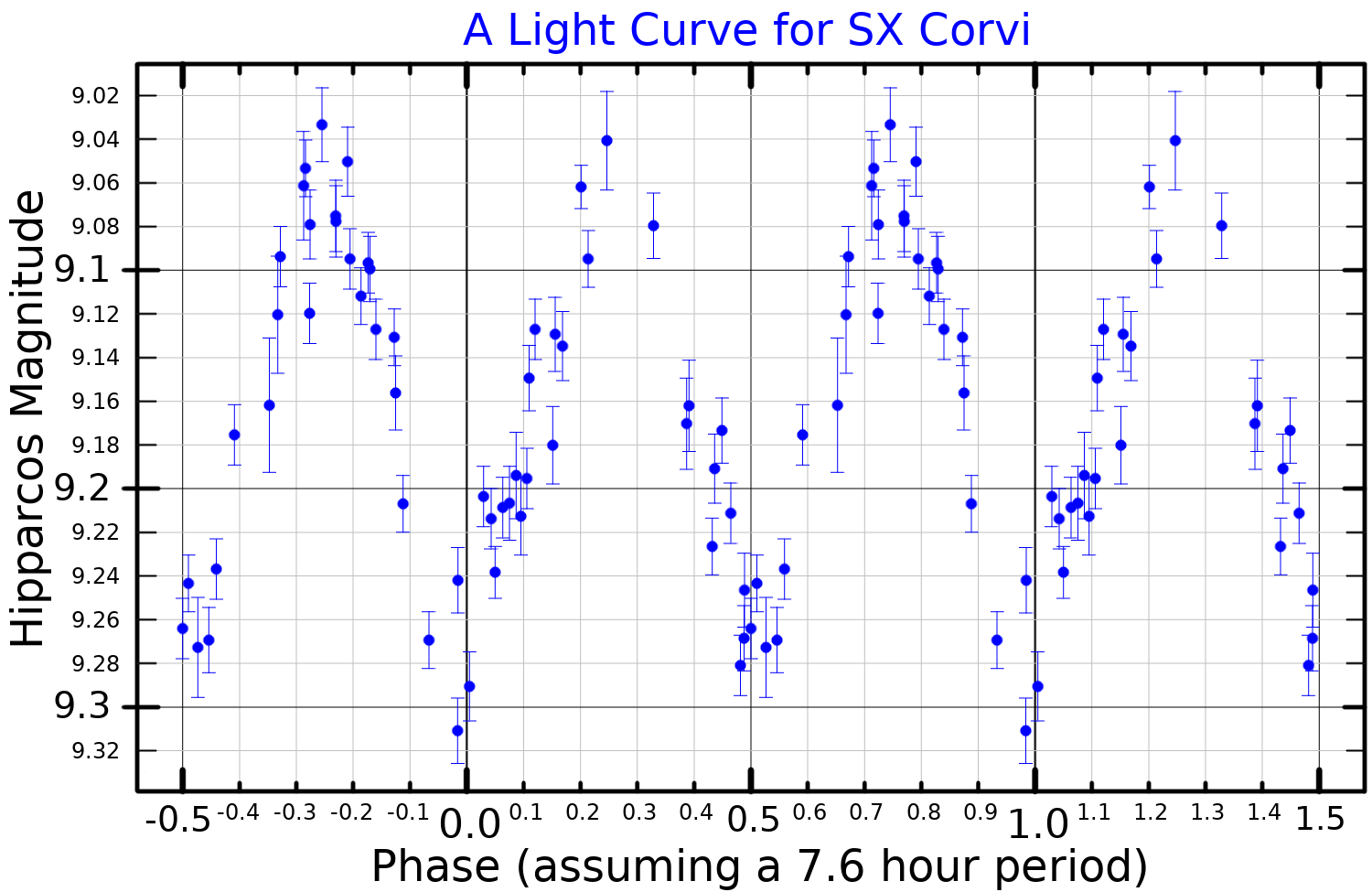
A lightcurve of SX Corvi, plotted from Hipparcos data
