= WZ Cephei =

Binary star in the constellation Cepheus

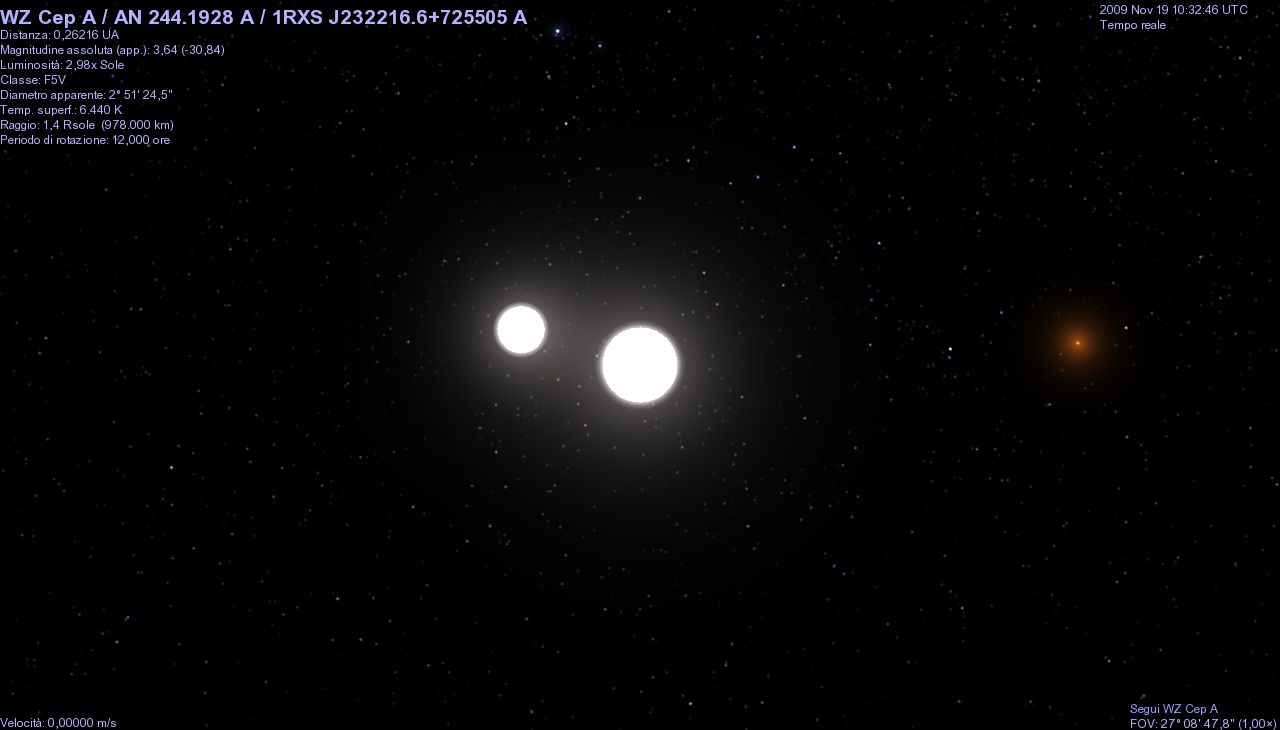
- Celestia 1.6.1's impression of WZ Cephei, eclipsing binary of W UMa-type.

Observation data Epoch J2000 Equinox J2000
- Constellation: Cepheus
- Right ascension: 23^{h} 22^{m} 24.193^{s}
- Declination: +72° 54′ 56.83″
- Apparent magnitude (V): +11.22

Characteristics
- Spectral type: F5V+F5V
- Variable type: W Ursae Majoris-type

Astrometry
Proper motion (μ)	RA: 18.655±0.013 mas/yr Dec.: −37.713±0.012 mas/yr
Parallax (π)	3.3419±0.0105 mas
Distance	976 ± 3 ly (299.2 ± 0.9 pc)

Orbit
Period (P)	0.00114 yr
Semi-major axis (a)	0.013 AU
Eccentricity (e)	0.0
Inclination (i)	86.2°

Details

A
Mass	1.1 M_{☉}
Radius	1.4 R_{☉}
Luminosity	3 L_{☉}
Temperature	6400 K

B
Mass	0.83 M_{☉}
Radius	0.82 R_{☉}
Luminosity	1 L_{☉}

Other designations
- WZ Cep, 2MASS J23222421+7254566, 1RXS J232216.6+725505

Database references
SIMBAD	data

WZ Cephei is an eclipsing binary star of W Ursae Majoris-type in the constellation of Cepheus, located 976 light years away from the Sun. The stars orbit around a common orbital barycenter every 0.41744 days (slightly over 10 hours). Timing analyses have revealed the possible presence of a third low-mass stellar companion in a wide orbit.

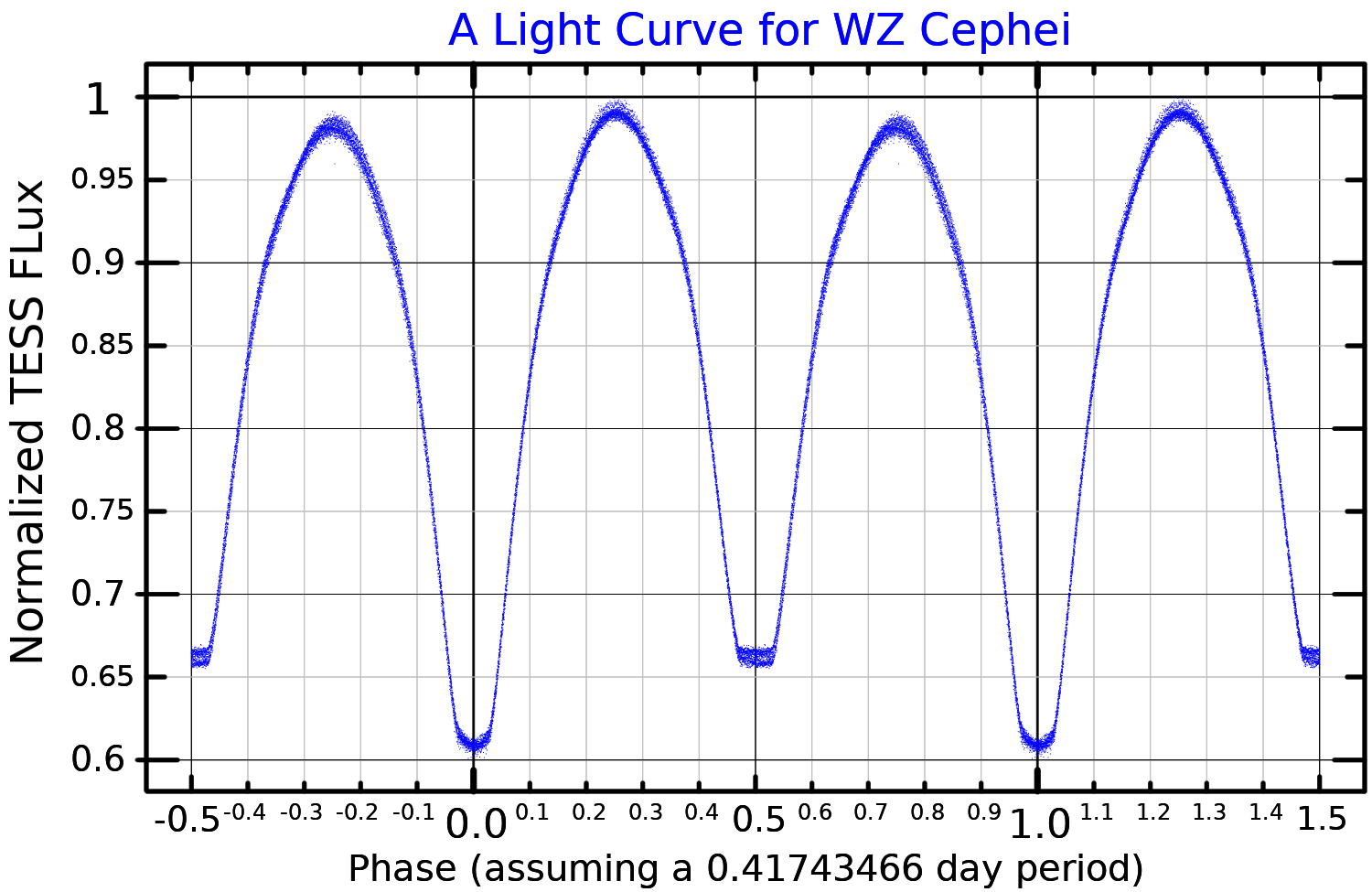
A light curve for WZ Cephei, plotted from TESS data

Heribert Schneller announced the discovery that the star is a variable star, in 1928.

== Presence of a third body ==
According to Zhu & Qian (2009) a third low-mass object of stellar nature could be responsible of orbital period variations observed for WZ Cep with a periodicity of roughly 32 years. Such a companion would yield a minimum mass of 0.17 Solar masses and be located 26.6 Astronomical Units (nearly the same orbital separation of Neptune in Solar System) from the eclipsing binary. The star could likely turn out a Proxima Centauri-analog, with inferred luminosity 3.7 percent that of Sun and 20 percent of its radius, according to mass-radius relationship.
