= AB Andromedae =

Binary star in the Andromeda constellation

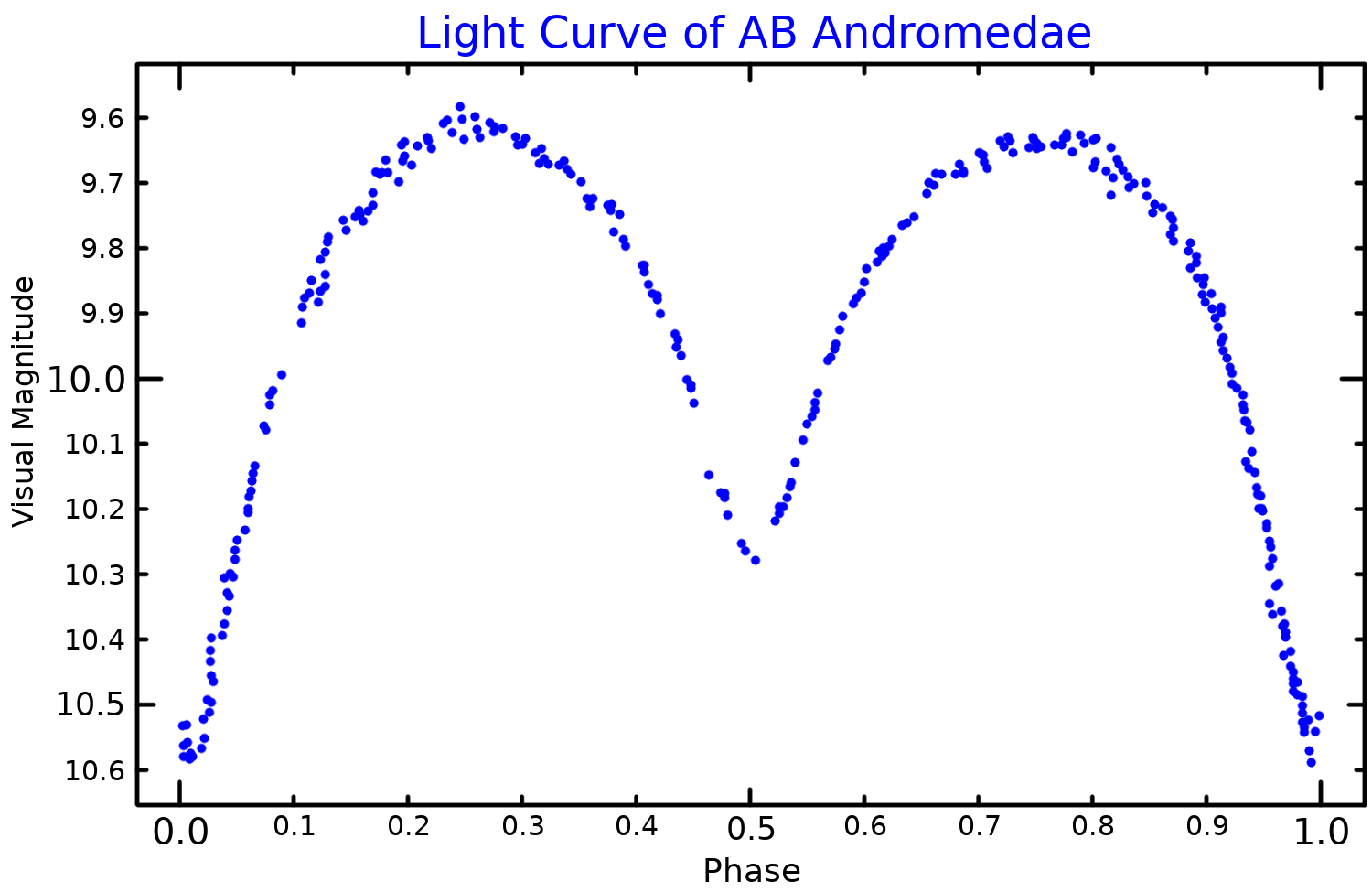
- The visual band light curve of AB Andromedae, adapted from Parimucha et al.

Observation data Epoch J2000 Equinox ICRS
- Constellation: Andromeda
- Right ascension: 23^{h} 11^{m} 32.08593^{s}
- Declination: +36° 53′ 35.1090″
- Apparent magnitude (V): 9.49 ( – 10.32) – 10.46

Characteristics
- Spectral type: G5+G5V
- Apparent magnitude (B): 10.62
- Apparent magnitude (V): 9.675
- Apparent magnitude (G): 9.713
- Apparent magnitude (J): 8.172
- Apparent magnitude (H): 7.805
- Apparent magnitude (K): 7.665
- B−V color index: 0.9163
- Variable type: EW

Astrometry
Radial velocity (R_{v})	−27.53±0.67 km/s
Proper motion (μ)	RA: 108.034±0.021 mas/yr Dec.: −53.476±0.017 mas/yr
Parallax (π)	11.7164±0.0200 mas
Distance	278.4 ± 0.5 ly (85.4 ± 0.1 pc)

Orbit
Period (P)	0.3319 days
Semi-major axis (a)	2.308 R_{☉}
Eccentricity (e)	0.002±0.001
Argument of periastron (ω) (secondary)	40±5°
Argument of periastron (ω) (primary)	220±5°
Semi-amplitude (K_{1}) (primary)	233±1 km/s
Semi-amplitude (K_{2}) (secondary)	133±1 km/s

Details

Primary
Mass	1.03 M_{☉}
Radius	1.15 R_{☉}
Luminosity	0.77 L_{☉}
Surface gravity (log g)	4.392 cgs
Temperature	5,798 K
Age	5.53±2.00 Gyr

Secondary
Mass	0.58 M_{☉}
Radius	0.82 R_{☉}
Luminosity	0.53 L_{☉}
Surface gravity (log g)	4.347 cgs
Temperature	5,450 K
Age	5.53±2.00 Gyr

Other designations
- 2MASS J23113209+3653351, BD+36 5017, HIP 114508, SAO 73069, TYC 2763-904-1

Database references
SIMBAD	data

AB Andromedae (AB And) is a binary star in the constellation Andromeda. Paul Guthnick and Richard Prager discovered that the star is an eclipsing binary in 1927. Its maximum apparent visual magnitude is 9.49 but shows a variation in brightness down to a magnitude of 10.46 in a periodic cycle of roughly 8 hours. The observed variability is typical of W Ursae Majoris variable stars, so the two stars in this system form a contact binary.

== System ==
The observed spectral type of both stars in this system is G5, and one of them is a main sequence star very similar to the sun. They are orbiting so close that their envelopes touch each other. This is a dynamically stable phase that should last until one of the two stars leaves the main sequence.

The system could also host a third body with an orbital period of 19,046 days, a minimum mass of 0.007 M_{☉} and an eccentricity of 0.22, but not all data collected in time are consistent with this hypothesis.

== Variability ==
The two stars eclipse each other during their orbit, but they have an elongated shape so they show a constant variation instead of discrete eclipses. Anyway, a periodicity can be seen clearly, but it changes with time; the period shows a long-term trend and a periodic modulation of 7,000 days. The effects responsible for this behaviour could be a third body in the system, magnetic interaction between two stars, mass transfer from one star to the other, mass loss of the system, and recently even an internal mechanism in the touching envelopes have been proposed.
