= VW Cephei =

Star system in the constellation Cepheus

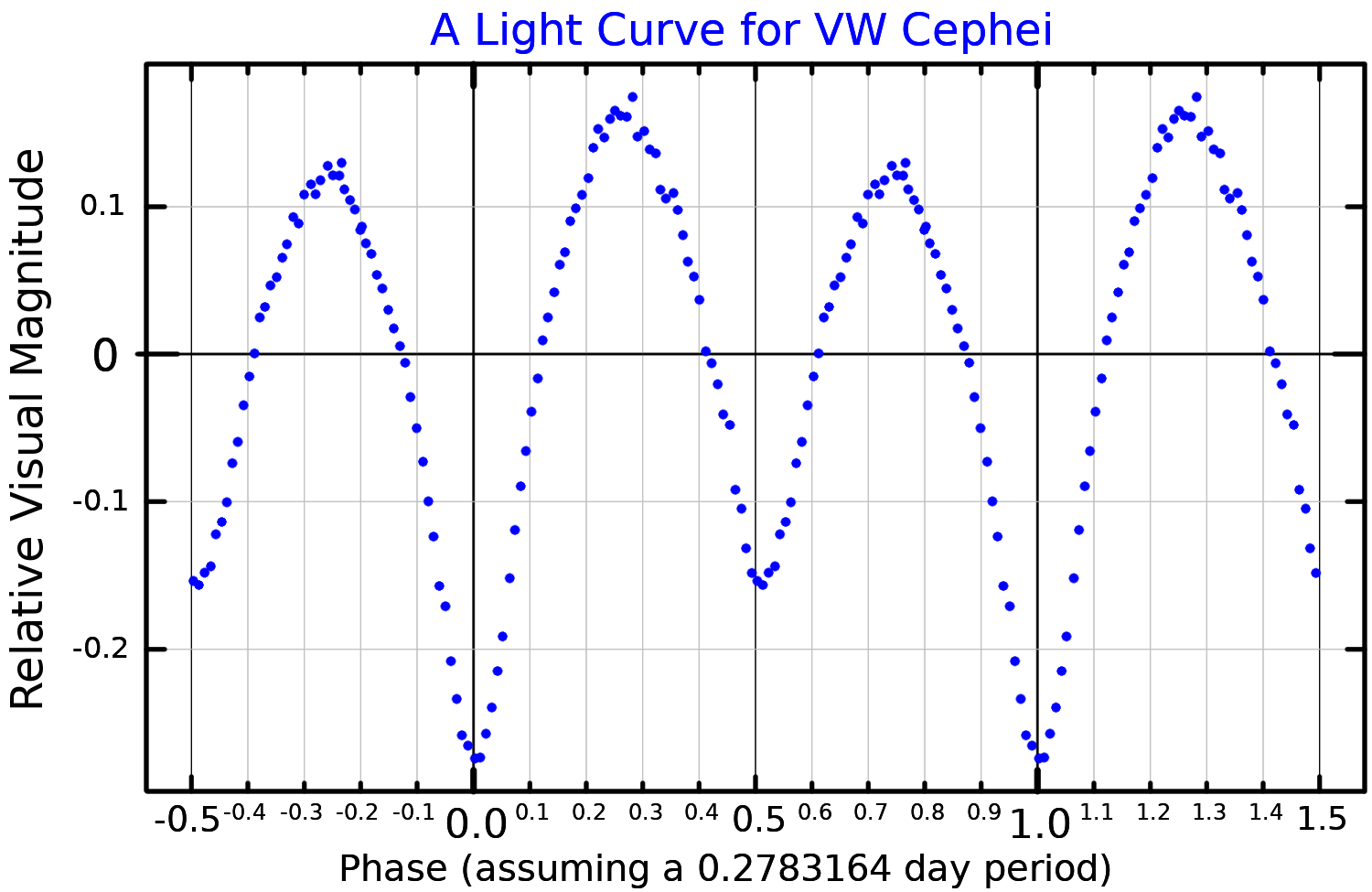
- A visual band light curve for VW Cephei, adapted from Kreiner and Winiarski (1981)

Observation data Epoch J2000.0 Equinox ICRS
- Constellation: Cepheus
- Right ascension: 20^{h} 37^{m} 21.5439^{s}
- Declination: +75° 36′ 01.467″
- Apparent magnitude (V): 7.30 – 7.84

Characteristics

A
- Spectral type: G8V

B
- Spectral type: K0V

Astrometry
Proper motion (μ)	RA: +308.71 mas/yr Dec.: +540.86 mas/yr
Parallax (π)	36.25±0.58 mas
Distance	91.00 ± 0.95 ly (27.90±0.29 pc)

Orbit
Primary	A
Name	B
Period (P)	0.278315349(12) days
Semi-major axis (a)	(1.412±0.010)×10^{6} km (2.030±0.014 R_{☉})
Inclination (i)	62.86±0.04°

Orbit
Primary	AB
Name	C
Period (P)	29.79±0.08 years
Semi-major axis (a)	4.33±0.20 AU
Eccentricity (e)	0.633±0.007
Inclination (i)	33.6±1.2°
Longitude of the node (Ω)	17.7±3.1°
Argument of periastron (ω) (secondary)	239.28±2.88°

Details

A
Mass	1.13 M_{☉}
Radius	0.99 R_{☉}
Temperature	5,050 K
Age	9.029 Gyr

B
Mass	0.34 M_{☉}
Radius	0.57 R_{☉}
Temperature	5,342±15 K
Age	9.029 Gyr

C
Mass	0.74±0.07 M_{☉}

Other designations
- VW Cep, LHS 3565, SAO 9828, LTT 16039, BD+75 752, GJ 1255, GJ 9703, HD 197433, HIP 101750

Database references
SIMBAD	data

VW Cephei (VW Cep) is a triple star in the constellation Cepheus, located roughly at 90.6 light years from the Sun.

The two inner components form an eclipsing contact binary of W Ursae Majoris-type, whose two component stars share a common outer layer. Both are main-sequence stars smaller than the Sun. They take 0.2783 days (roughly 6.7 hours) to revolve around a common barycentre. Jan Schilt discovered that the star is an eclipsing variable, in 1926.

The third component has been detected by analysing the difference between the observed and the predicted time of eclipses, which is caused by the light-time effect of its orbital motion around the pair, and has been independently detected by astrometry. It has an orbital period of 29.79 years around the inner pair. A fourth component has also been proposed to explain additional changes in eclipse timing, but it was later found that the period variations are more likely caused by mass transfer between components via the Applegate mechanism, rather than the presence of a fourth companion.
