= CG Cygni =

Eclipsing ternary star system in constellation Cygnus

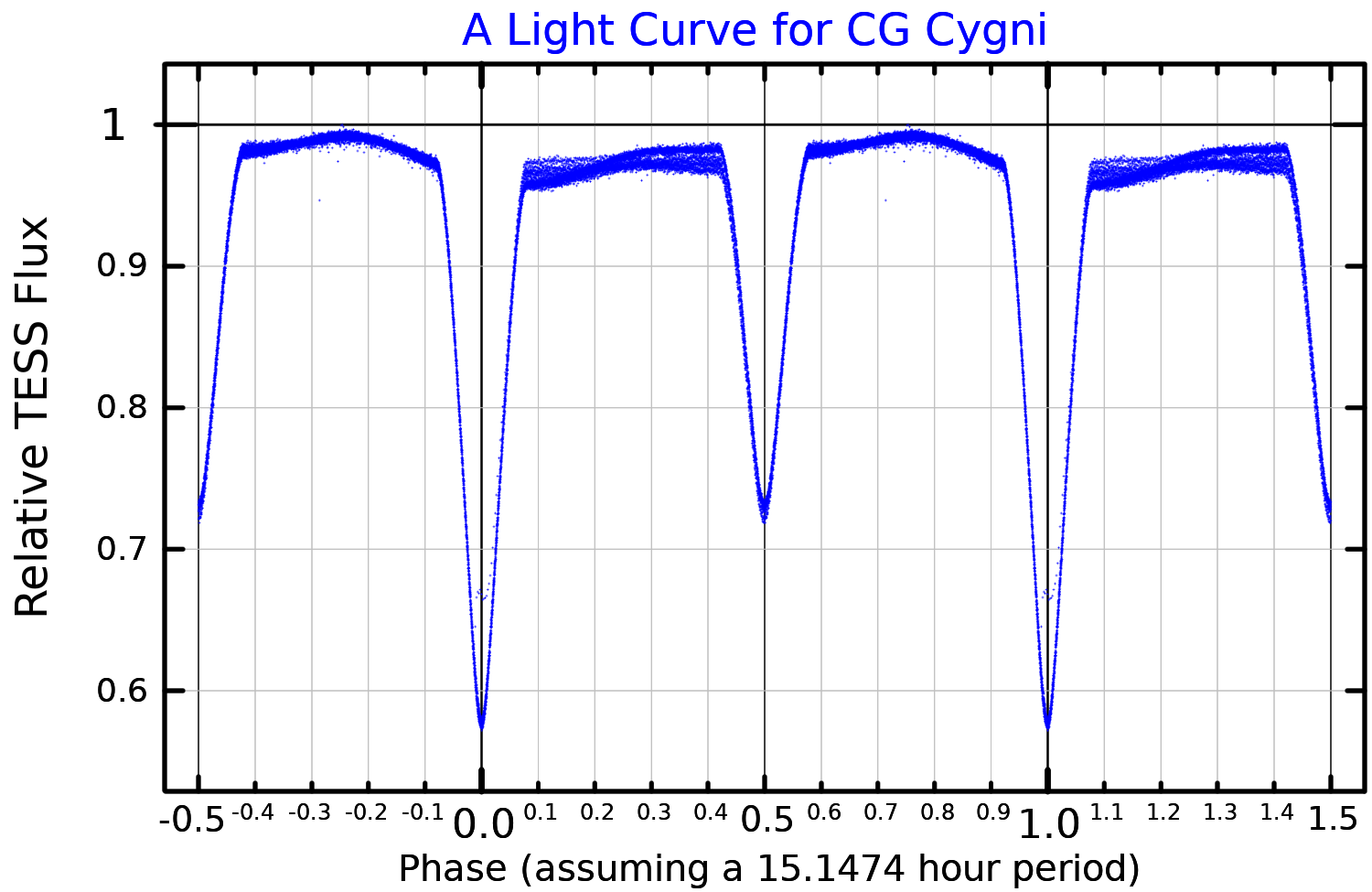
- A light curve for CG Cygni, plotted from TESS data

Observation data Epoch J2000 Equinox ICRS
- Constellation: Cygnus
- Right ascension: 20^{h} 58^{m} 13.4534^{s}
- Declination: +35° 10′ 29.6642″

Characteristics

BD+34 4217A
- Evolutionary stage: main-sequence star
- Spectral type: G9+K3
- Apparent magnitude (g): 10.06
- Variable type: RS Canum Venaticorum variable

BD+34 4217B
- Apparent magnitude (g): 11.74

Astrometry

BD+34 4217A
| Proper motion (μ) | RA: 6.638±0.014 mas/yr Dec.: −13.87±0.02 mas/yr |
| Parallax (π) | 10.2393±0.0170 mas |
| Distance | 318.5 ± 0.5 ly (97.7 ± 0.2 pc) |

BD+34 4217B
| Proper motion (μ) | RA: 9.86±0.05 mas/yr Dec.: -16.32±0.06 mas/yr |
| Parallax (π) | 10.2046±0.0391 mas |
| Distance | 320 ± 1 ly (98.0 ± 0.4 pc) |

Orbit
| Primary | BD+34 4217Aa |
| Name | BD+34 4217Ab |
| Period (P) | 0.6311 d |
| Inclination (i) | 82.602±0.099° |

Details

BD+34 4217Aa
| Mass | 0.97 M_{☉} |
| Radius | 0.893 R_{☉} |
| Temperature | 5200 K |

BD+34 4217Ab
| Mass | 0.80 M_{☉} |
| Radius | 0.838 R_{☉} |
| Temperature | 4400 K |

Other designations
- 2MASS J20581343+3510298, HIP 103505, GSC 02696-02945, BD+34 4217, Gaia DR2 1866704219781935360
- BD+34 4217A: CG Cyg A, TYC 2696-2945-1, Gaia EDR3 1866704219781935360
- BD+34 4217B: CG Cyg B, TYC 2696-2945-2, Gaia EDR3 1866704219775706624

Database references
| SIMBAD | data |

CG Cygni is a ternary star system composed of main-sequence stars in the constellation of Cygnus about 320 light years away.

== System ==
The star CG Cygni A (BD+34 4217A) itself is a close binary system with ongoing mass transfer between components. The orbital period of the binary is currently increasing. An additional third body (either star or planet) was suspected to exist in the system with an orbital period of 15.9-51 years, creating cyclic period variations of the binary. It was finally confirmed as the star CG Cygni B (BD+34 4217B) in 2020, at a 1.16 arcsecond separation from the primary.

== Properties ==
The primary, BD+34 4217Aa, has a large number of starspots covering up to 18% of its surface. These are located in low latitudes, usually perpendicular to the line connecting the stars Aa and Ab, although reversal of the starspots positions was detected in 1991, 2003 and 2008.
