= O'Connell effect =

Asymmetry in light curves

The O'Connell effect is an asymmetry in the photometric light curve of certain close eclipsing binary stars. It was named after the astronomer Daniel Joseph Kelly O'Connell, SJ of Riverview College in New South Wales who in 1951 studied this phenomenon and distinguished it from the so-called periastron effect described by earlier authors, as it does not necessarily appear near the periastron, when tidal effects and an increase in mutual radiation may cause an increase in luminosity.

== The effect ==
The out-of-eclipse brightness maxima of some binary stars are unequally high. This is contrary to expectations that the observed luminosity of an eclipsing binary should be the same when its components switch positions every half period. The maximum following the primary minimum is nearly always brighter than the preceding one. This is called the positive O'Connell effect, the reverse case is referred to as the negative O'Connell effect. The difference increases with the ellipticity of the stars, and the differences in their sizes and densities. Also, spectral differences have been observed between subsequent maxima.

== Attempts at explanation ==
In some systems where the phenomenon has been observed, such as in CG Cygni, RT Lacertae, XY Ursae Majoris, or YY Eridani, the luminosity difference between subsequent maxima has been found to be variable, in others relatively stable. Furthermore, it has been observed in a variety of configurations, such as over-contact, semi-detached, and near contact systems alike. These factors make an explanation difficult and suggest that various mechanisms may be responsible for the effect to manifest. Several reasons have thus been proposed: an asymmetric distribution of starspots, impacts of one-way gas streams between the components of the binary system, or the flow of circumstellar matter, asymmetrically deflected due to Coriolis forces.

== Examples ==
The O'Connell effect has been observed, among others, in the binary systems W Crucis, RT Lacertae, CX Canis Majoris, TU Crucis, AQ Monocerotis, DQ Velorum, and CG Cygni.
