= W Ursae Majoris variable =

Type of variable stellar binary

Schematic of a W Ursae Majoris variable with a mass ratio of 3. Both stars (the filled regions) overfill their Roche lobes (enclosed by the black lines).

A W Ursae Majoris variable, also known as a low mass contact binary, is a type of eclipsing binary variable star. These stars are close binaries of spectral types F, G, or K that share a common envelope of material and are thus in contact with one another. They are termed contact binaries because the two stars touch and transfer mass and energy through the connecting neck, although astronomer Robert E. Wilson argues that the term "overcontact" is more appropriate.

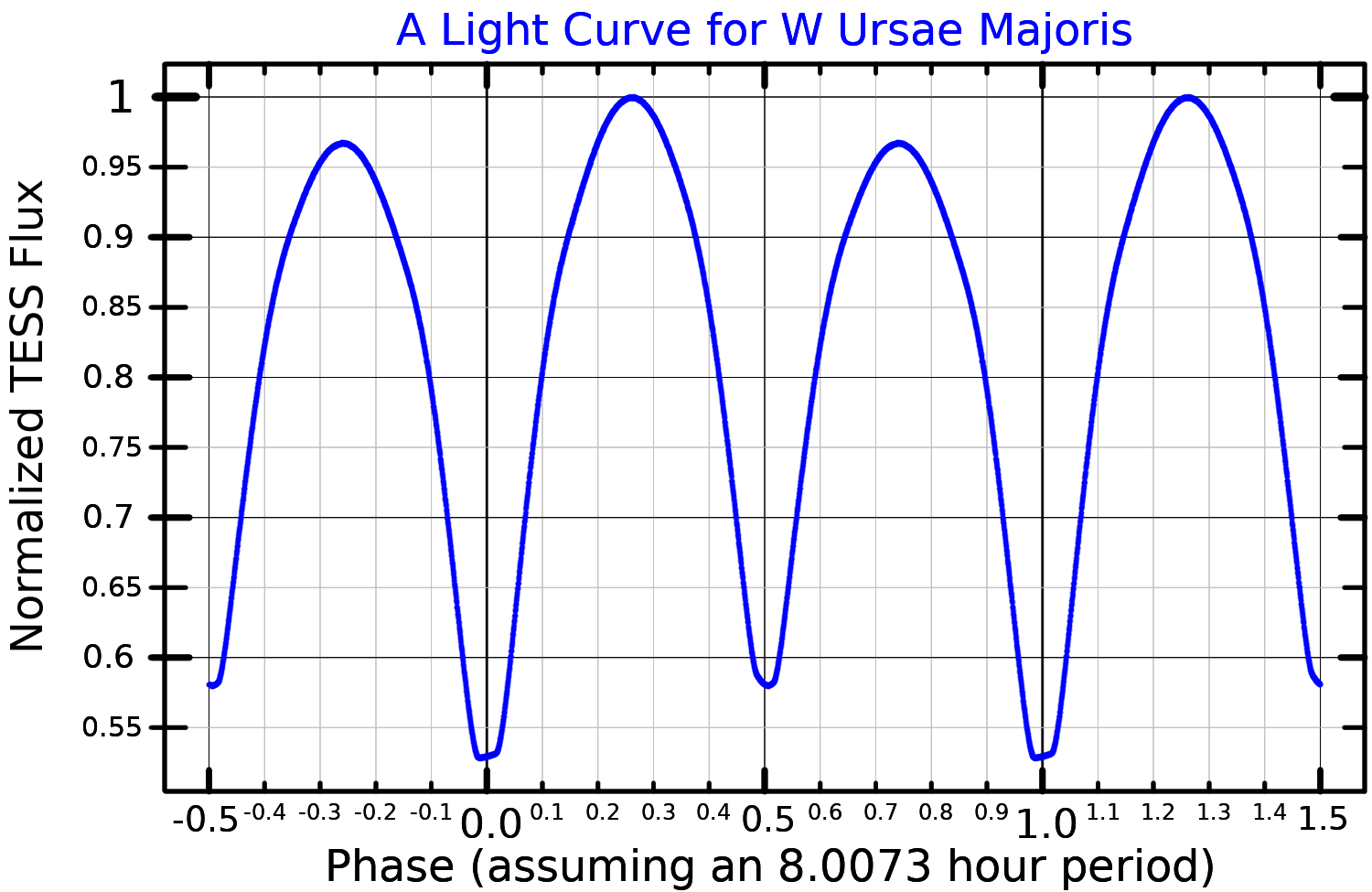
A light curve for W Ursae Majoris, the class prototype, plotted from TESS data

The class is divided into two subclasses: A-type and W-type. A-type W UMa binaries are composed of two stars both hotter than the Sun, having spectral types A or F, and periods of 0.4 to 0.8 day. The W-types have cooler spectral types of G or K and shorter periods of 0.22 to 0.4 day. The difference between the surface temperatures of the components is less than several hundred kelvins. A new subclass was introduced in 1978: B-type. The B-types have larger surface temperature difference. In 2004 the H (high mass ratio) systems were discovered by Szilárd Csizmadia and Peter Klagyivik. The H-types have a higher mass ratio than $q=0.72$ ($q$ = (secondary's mass)/(primary's mass)) and they have extra angular momentum.

These stars were first shown to follow a period-color relation (shorter period systems are redder) by Olin J. Eggen. In 2012, Terrell, Gross and Cooney published a color-survey of 606 W UMa systems in the Johnson-Cousins photometric system.

Their light curves differ from those of classical eclipsing binaries, undergoing a constant ellipsoidal variation rather than discrete eclipses. This is because the stars are gravitationally distorted by one another, and thus the projected area of the stars is constantly changing. The depths of the brightness minima are usually equal because both stars have nearly equal surface temperatures.

W Ursae Majoris is the prototype of this class.

Designation (name)	Constellation	Discovery	Apparent magnitude (Maximum) (Note: (visual magnitude, unless marked (B) (= blue) or (p) (= photographic)))	Apparent magnitude (Minimum)	Range of magnitude	Period	Spectral types (eclipsing components)		Comment
AB And	Andromeda		10.40	11.27	0.87	0.3319 d	G5	G5V	
S Ant	Antlia	H.M.Paul, 1891	6.27	6.83	0.56	0.6483489 d	A9V	A9V	
44 (or i) Boo B	Boötes		5.8	6.4	0.6	0.2678159 d	G2V	G2V	Triple system, A being non-variable
TU Boo	Boötes		11.8	12.5	0.7	0.324 d	G3		
VW Cep	Cepheus		7.23	7.68	0.45	0.278 d	G5	K0Ve	
WZ Cep	Cepheus		11.4	12.0	0.6	0.41744 d	F5		Possible triple system
ε CrA	Corona Australis		4.74	5.0	0.26	0.5914264 d			
SX Crv	Corvus		8.99	9.25	0.26	0.32 d	F7V	?	
V1191 Cyg	Cygnus		10.82	11.15	0.33	0.31 d	F6V	G5V	
BW Dra	Draco		8.61	9.08	0.47	0.2921671 d	G3V	G0V	
V571 Dra	Draco	Barquin, 2018	14.43	14.77	0.34	0.428988 d			
XY Leo	Leo		9.45	9.93	0.48	0.284 d	K0V	K0	
CE Leo	Leo		11.8	12.6	0.8	0.303 d			
TV Pic	Pictor	Verschuren, 1987	7.37	7.53	0.16	0.85 d	A2V	A9-F0V	
Y Sex	Sextans		9.81	10.23	0.42	0.42 d	F3/5V[4] or F5/6V		Possibly two substellar companions
W UMa	Ursa Major		7.75	8.48	0.73	0.3336 d	F8Vp	F8Vp	Prototype, possible triple system
