= W Ursae Majoris =

Star in the constellation Ursa Major

- The red dot shows the location of W Ursae Majoris in Ursa Major.

Observation data Epoch J2000 Equinox ICRS
- Constellation: Ursa Major
- Right ascension: 09^{h} 43^{m} 45.4705^{s}
- Declination: +55^{h} 57^{m} 09.067^{s}
- Apparent magnitude (V): 7.75–8.48

Characteristics
- Evolutionary stage: main sequence
- Spectral type: F8Vp + F8Vp
- U−B color index: +0.08
- B−V color index: +0.66
- Variable type: W UMa

Astrometry
Radial velocity (R_{v})	−46 km/s
Proper motion (μ)	RA: 17.150±0.049 mas/yr Dec.: −29.226±0.050 mas/yr
Parallax (π)	19.2775±0.0334 mas
Distance	169.2 ± 0.3 ly (51.87 ± 0.09 pc)

Orbit
Period (P)	0.3336352(2) d
Semi-major axis (a)	2.443 R_{☉}
Inclination (i)	88.4±0.8°

Details

W UMa A
Mass	1.139±0.019 M_{☉}
Radius	1.092±0.016 R_{☉}
Luminosity	1.557±0.166 L_{☉}
Temperature	6,450±100 K
Rotational velocity (v sin i)	144.40±6.52 km/s

W UMa B
Mass	0.551±0.006 M_{☉}
Radius	0.792±0.015 R_{☉}
Luminosity	0.978±0.071 L_{☉}
Temperature	6,170±21 K

Other designations
- HD 83950, HIP 47727, SAO 27364, ADS 7494, CCDM J09438+5557A

Database references
SIMBAD	data
- B

W Ursae Majoris (W UMa) is the variable star designation for a binary star system in the northern constellation of Ursa Major. It has an apparent visual magnitude of about 8, which is too faint to be seen with the naked eye. However, it can be viewed with a small telescope. Parallax measurements place it at a distance of roughly 169 light years (52 parsecs) from Earth.

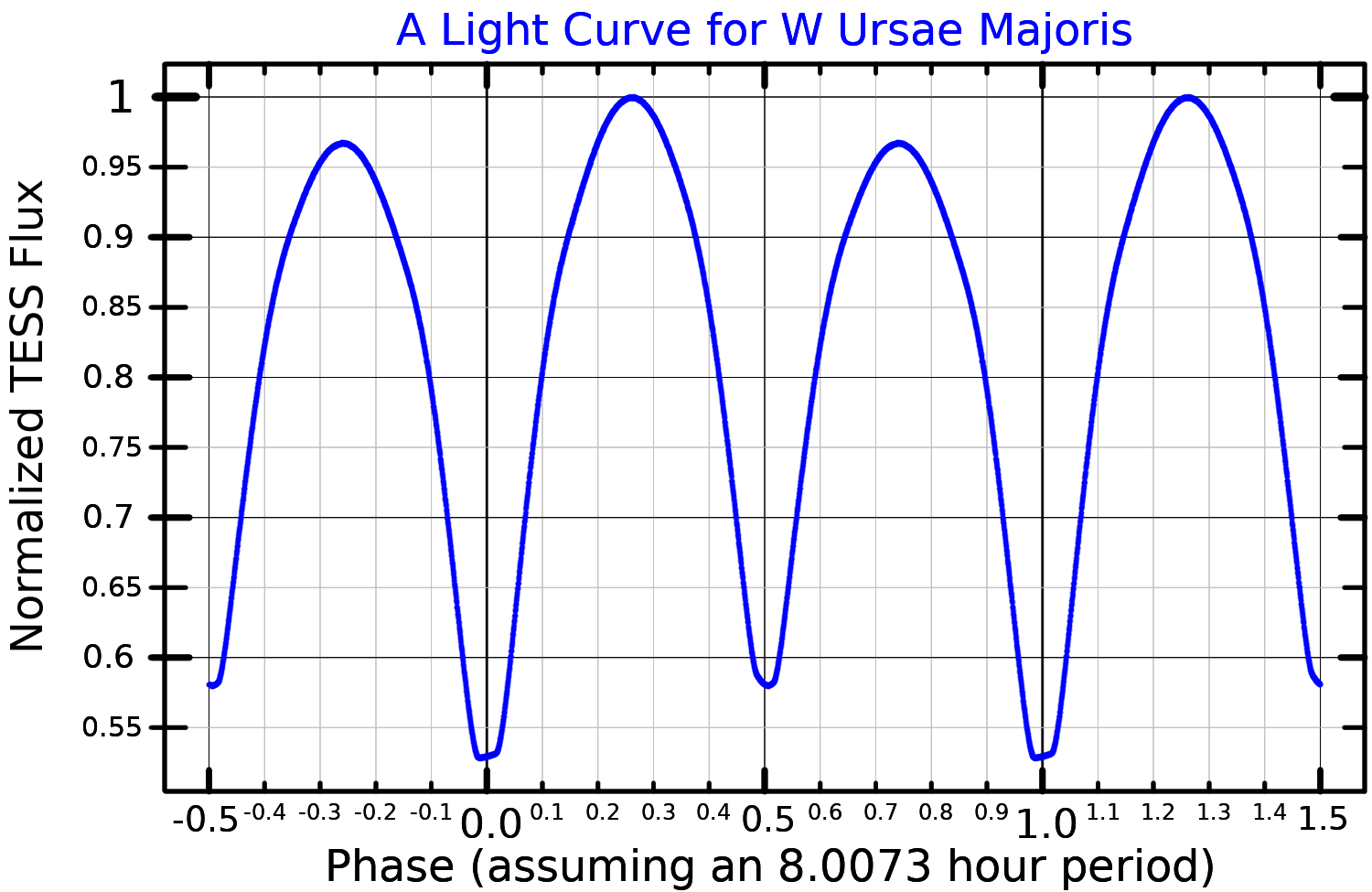
A light curve for W Ursae Majoris, plotted from TESS data

In 1903, the luminosity of this system was found to vary by the German astronomers Gustav Müller and Paul Kempf. It has since become the prototype and eponym for a class of variable stars called W Ursae Majoris variables. This system consists of a pair of stars in a tight, circular orbit with a period of 0.3336 days, or eight hours and 26 seconds. During every orbital cycle, each star eclipses the other, resulting in a decrease in magnitude. The maximum magnitude of the pair is 7.75 mag. During the eclipse of the primary, the net magnitude drops by 0.73 mag, while the eclipse of the secondary causes a magnitude decrease of 0.68 mag.

The two stars in W Ursae Majoris are so close together that their outer envelopes are in direct contact, making them a contact binary system. As a result, they have the same stellar classification of F8Vp, which matches the spectrum of a main-sequence star that is generating energy through the nuclear fusion of hydrogen. However, the primary component has a larger mass and radius than the secondary, with 1.14 times the Sun's mass and 1.09 times the Sun's radius. The secondary has 0.55 solar masses and 0.79 solar radii.

The orbital period of the system has changed since 1903, which may be the result of mass transfer or the braking effects of magnetic fields. Star spots have been observed on the surface of the stars and strong X-ray emissions have been detected, indicating a high level of magnetic activity that is common to W UMa variables. This magnetic activity may play a role in regulating the timing and magnitude of mass transfer occurs.

W Ursae Majoris has a 12th magnitude companion star with the designation ADS 7494B, not to be confused with the secondary of the close eclipsing pair. They may be moving together through space.
